= Gerok =

Gerok is a surname. Notable people with the surname include:

- Friedrich von Gerok (1786–1865), German theologian
- Friedrich von Gerok (1854–1937), German General in XXIV Reserve Corps (German Empire)
- Karl Gerok (1815–1890), German theologian and lyricist, of Eberhard-Ludwigs-Gymnasium
- Karl Ludwig Gerok (1906–1975), German organist and composer
- Wolfgang Gerok (born 1926), German physician on List of recipients of the Pour le Mérite for Sciences and Arts
