= Death and state funeral of George VI =

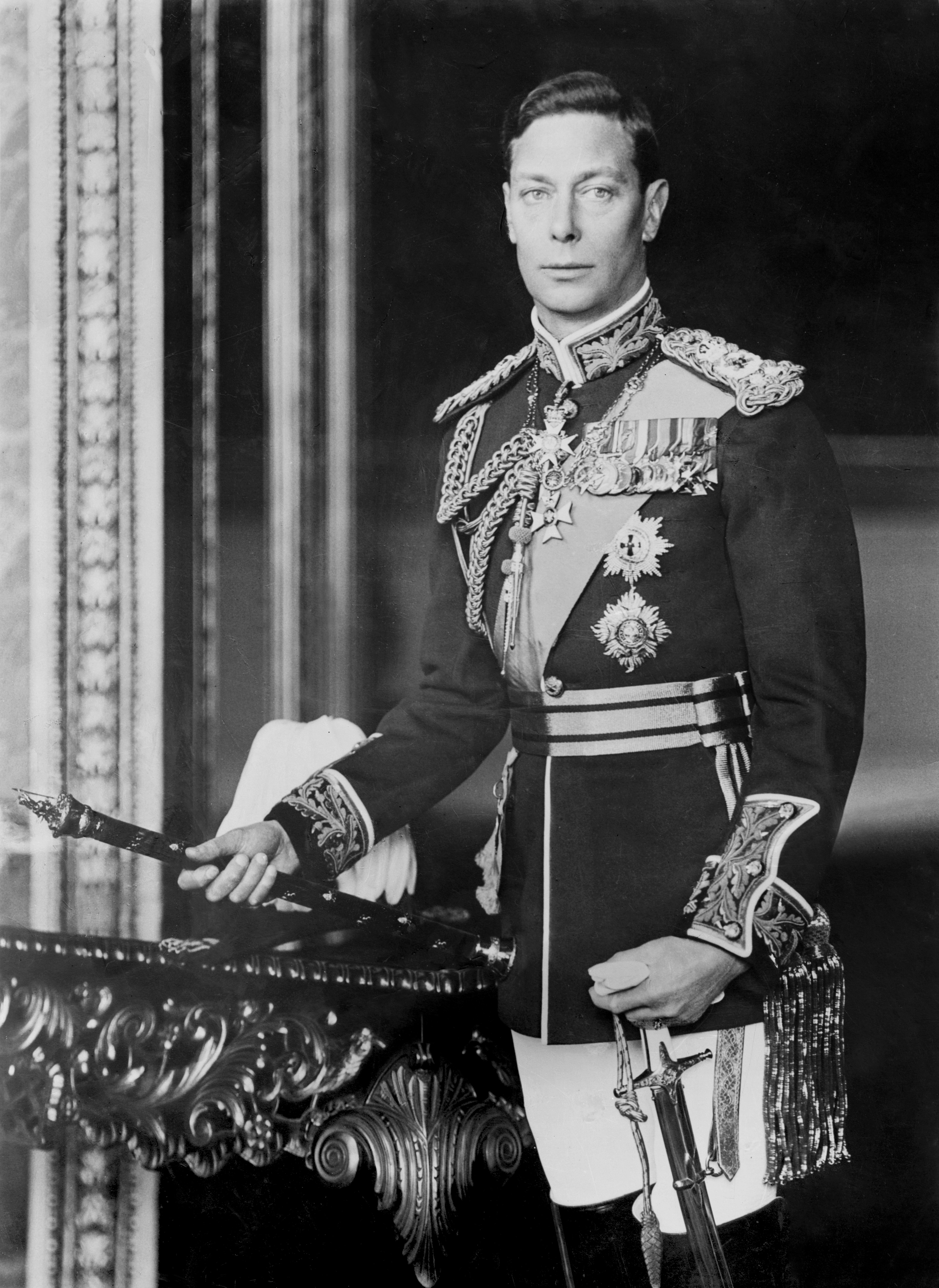
- Portrait by Walter Stoneman, 1938
- Date: 6 February 1952; (date of death); 15 February 1952; (date of state funeral)
- Location: Sandringham House, Norfolk; (place of death); Westminster Hall, London (lying in state); St George's Chapel, Windsor Castle; (official ceremony)
- Participants: See list

On 6 February 1952, George VI, King of the United Kingdom, died at the age of 56, at Sandringham House, after a prolonged cancer. His state funeral took place on 15 February 1952. He was succeeded by his daughter Queen Elizabeth II. George VI's coffin lay in St Mary Magdalene Church, Sandringham, until 11 February when it was carried, in procession, to the nearby Wolferton railway station. The coffin was carried by train to London King's Cross railway station where another formal procession carried it to Westminster Hall where the king lay in state for three days. Some 304,000 people passed through Westminster Hall with queues up to 4 miles (6.4 km) forming.

George VI's funeral began with another formal procession to Paddington Station, the coffin being carried on a gun carriage hauled by Royal Navy seamen, as is traditional at the funerals of British sovereigns. The procession was accompanied by Elizabeth II, George VI's widow Queen Elizabeth The Queen Mother, Princess Margaret and four royal dukes: Philip, Duke of Edinburgh, Prince Henry, Duke of Gloucester, Prince Edward, Duke of Windsor, and Prince Edward, Duke of Kent. Numerous foreign monarchs and other representatives also attended. On arrival at Paddington the coffin was loaded onto a train for the journey to Windsor. Another procession carried the coffin through the town to St George's Chapel in Windsor Castle where a service was held and the king interred in the royal vault.

The procession was the first of a British monarch to be broadcast on television and may have led to the start of a mass purchase of television sets. The king's body was relocated to the newly built King George VI Memorial Chapel, part of St George's Chapel, in 1969 and was joined there by the body of his wife Queen Elizabeth, and the ashes of his daughter Princess Margaret, who died in March 2002 and February 2002 respectively. In September 2022, following the death of his daughter, Queen Elizabeth II and her husband Prince Philip, who had died in April 2021, were interred alongside them in the Chapel. There was also a change in the inscription on the ledger stone following the interment of Elizabeth and Philip.

== Death ==
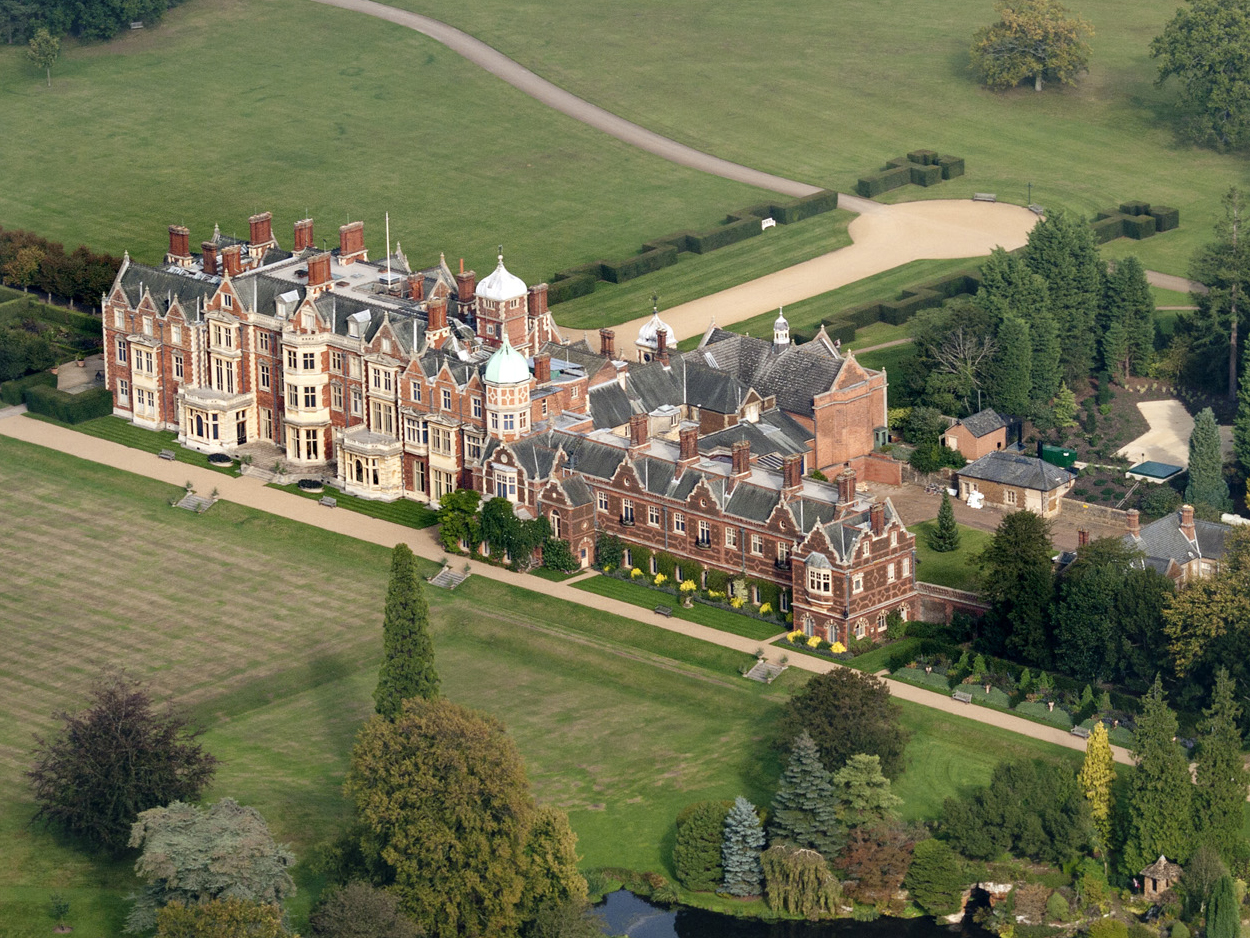
Sandringham House in Norfolk, where the King died

George VI had undergone a lung operation in September 1951 from which he never fully recovered. In the evening of 5 February 1952, he had a meal with his family at Sandringham House, Norfolk, and retired to bed at 10:30 pm. He died in his sleep on 6 February 1952 at the age of 56. He was discovered by his valet at 7:30 am and the news was conveyed to Buckingham Palace by telephone, using the code "Hyde Park Corner" to avoid alerting switchboard operators to the news. The news was not broken to the wider world until 11:15 am when BBC newsreader John Snagge read the words "It is with the greatest sorrow that we make the following announcement..." on the radio. The news was repeated every fifteen minutes for seven occasions, before the broadcast went silent for five hours. As a mark of respect the Great Tom bell at St Paul's Cathedral was tolled every minute for two hours, as well as the bells at Westminster Abbey. The Sebastopol Bell, a Crimean War trophy at Windsor Castle that is rung only upon a royal death, was tolled 56 times, once for each year of George VI's life, between 1:27 and 2:22 pm.

Royal funerals are overseen by the earl marshal, a hereditary post held at the time by Bernard Fitzalan-Howard, 16th Duke of Norfolk. The earl marshal has a suite of offices set aside for his use at St James's Palace in London. At the time of George VI's death these were being renovated and had to be hurriedly reopened. Scaffolding was dismantled, furniture moved in and phones, lighting and heating installed; the offices were ready by 5:00 pm.

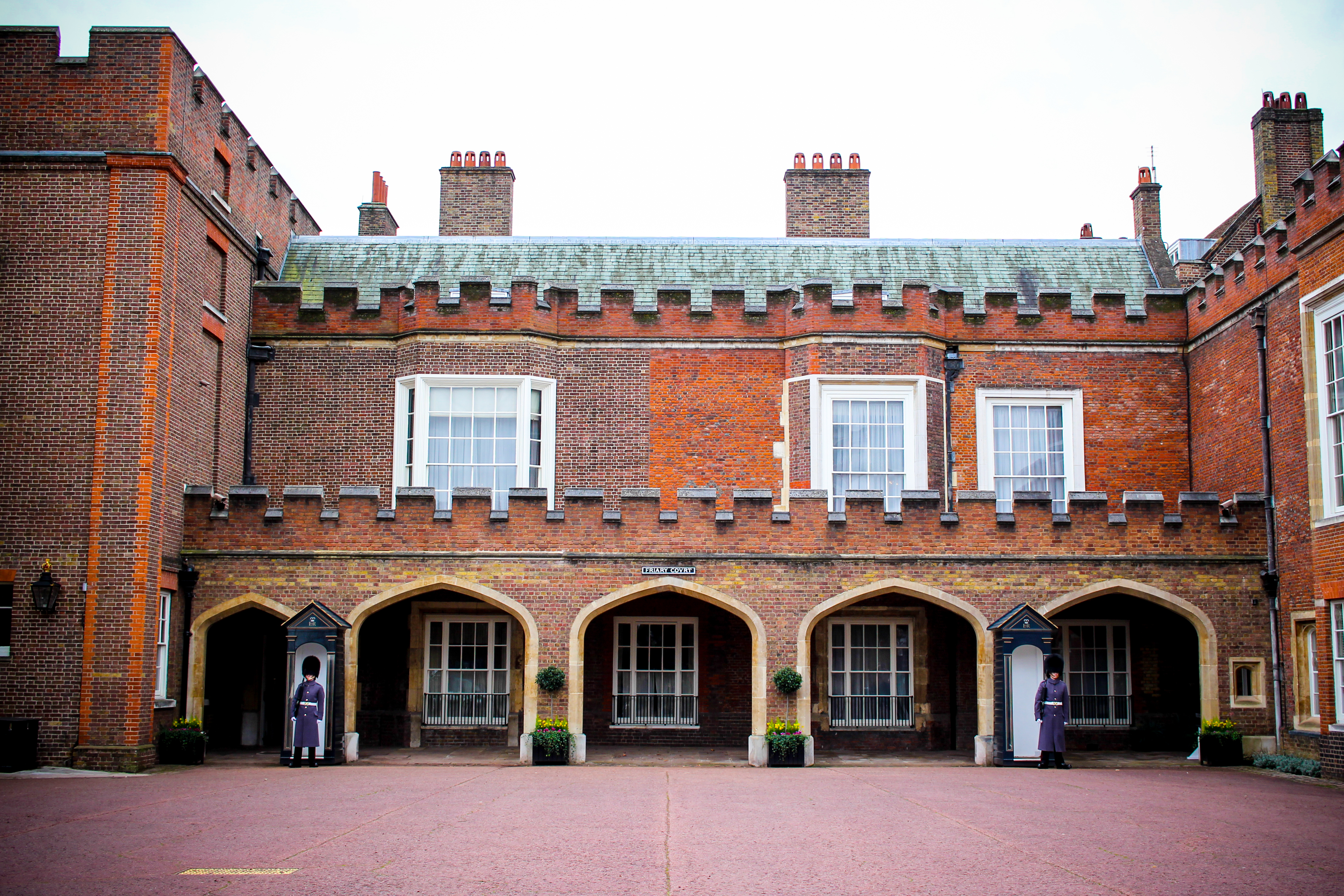
The Proclamation Gallery at St James's Palace in London

The House of Commons met at 11:58 am to express its grief before adjourning to await the confirmation by the Accession Council of the new monarch. The council met at 5:00 pm in the Entrée Room of St James's Palace and confirmed Elizabeth II as George VI's successor. An official proclamation of the accession was made by the Garter King of Arms on the Proclamation Gallery on the palace's eastern front, preceded by trumpet blasts from musicians from the Life Guards, the event being filmed by four television cameras. From then high sheriffs repeated the proclamation at town and city halls across the country. Some 5,000 attended the proclamation in Manchester, 10,000 in Birmingham and 15,000 in Edinburgh.

A period of national mourning followed George VI's death. Rugby and hockey games were postponed, though football matches continued with the singing of the national anthem and the hymn "Abide with Me" before each game. Memorial services were held in churches of all denominations across the country and around the world, even in communist states. There was some opposition to the mourning; social researchers from Mass-Observation recorded one 60-year-old woman who asked: "Don't they think of old folk, sick people, invalids? It's been terrible for them, all this gloom." On another occasion, the organisation recorded that a fight broke out in a Notting Hill bar after one man said of the King, "He's only shit and soil now like anyone else." Other countries declaring a period of national mourning included Australia, Canada, New Zealand and India.

== Journey to London ==
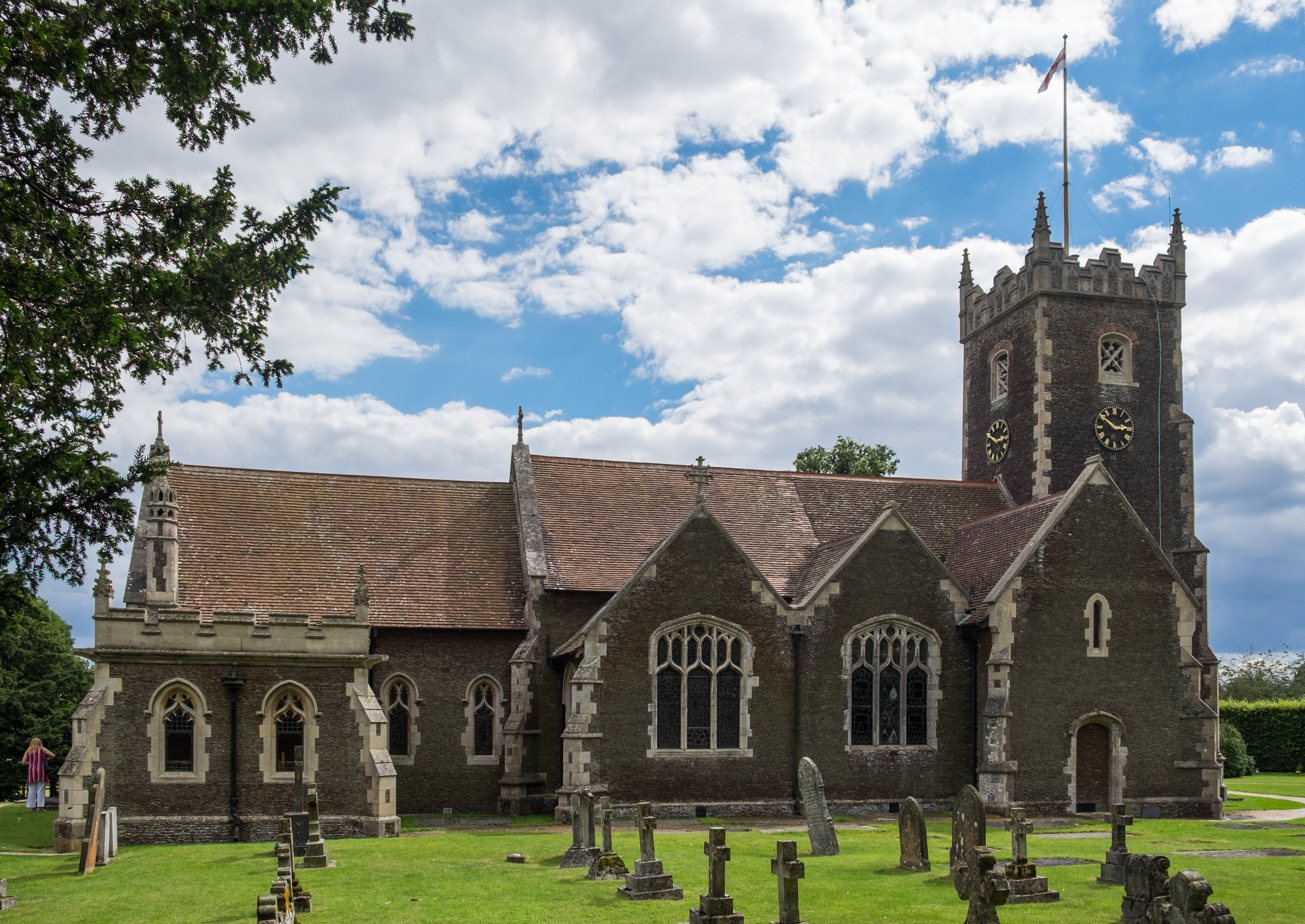
St Mary Magdalene Church

The body of George VI was dressed in a British Royal Navy uniform and placed in a coffin made from oak grown on the Sandringham estate. The coffin was laid in St Mary Magdalene Church, Sandringham where the king had worshipped while on the estate. On 11 February the coffin, draped in the Royal Standard on top of which his wife Queen Elizabeth had laid a wreath of flowers, was carried from the church. The coffin was placed onto a gun carriage of the King's Troop, Royal Horse Artillery for its journey to the nearby Wolferton railway station. The coffin was followed by George VI's brother Prince Henry, Duke of Gloucester and son-in-law Philip, Duke of Edinburgh, on foot. The new queen, Elizabeth II, her sister Princess Margaret and Queen Elizabeth the Queen Mother followed by car. The Sandringham estate staff and their families followed in procession part of the way and the public lined much of the route.

Upon arrival at the station the coffin was removed from the gun carriage by eight soldiers of the Grenadier Guards and placed into a railway carriage, the same carriage that had carried the coffin of George V (the deceased king's father) for the same journey to London. The carriage was pulled by the LNER Thompson Class B2 locomotive 61617 Ford Castle, the usual Royal Train locomotive, class-mate 61671 Royal Sovereign being unavailable. The line required a reversal at King's Lynn so the locomotive was changed for BR Standard Class 7 70000 Britannia. The cab roofs of the locomotives were painted white for the occasion, as this is traditional for locomotives of the British Royal Train. Britannia arrived at London King's Cross railway station on time at 2:45 pm.

== Procession and lying in state ==
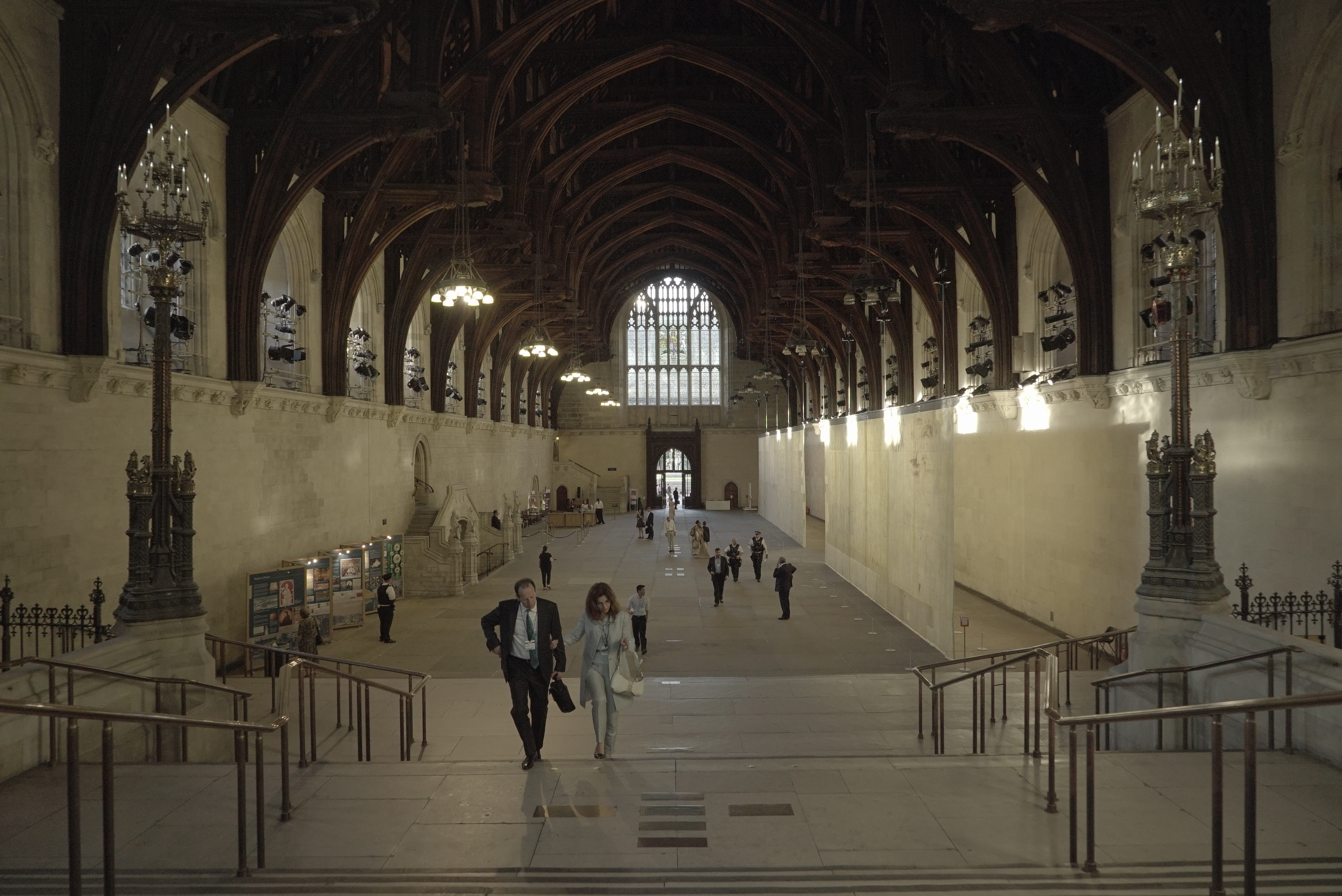
The interior of Westminster Hall, 2016

Before arrival in London the Imperial State Crown was placed on a cushion atop the coffin. The coffin was carried from the train by eight Grenadier Guards and placed onto a green-painted gun carriage, the same as had been used for the funeral procession of George V. Elizabeth II, Queen Elizabeth the Queen Mother and Princess Margaret followed the coffin on foot to the outside of the station and then boarded a car to travel to meet Queen Mary at Buckingham Palace. The King's coffin was drawn in procession to Westminster Hall where it was to lie in state. The coffin was drawn on a gun carriage by the Kings' Troop, escorted by an officer and ten men of the Grenadier Guards, preceded by mounted police. The Dukes of Gloucester and Edinburgh followed the coffin on foot, followed by members of George VI's royal household. The procession route was via Kingsway, Aldwych, Trafalgar Square and along Whitehall (where military officers in the procession saluted The Cenotaph) to Westminster Hall, part of the Palace of Westminster.

Crowds lined the route, and to create space for them to stand, the rhododendrons in Parliament Square were pulled up. The procession was broadcast on television, the first time that part of a royal funeral had this treatment, and also by radio. The BBC radio commentary by Richard Dimbleby has since received comment for its poignancy. Historian D. R. Thorpe considered that the funeral helped spark the mass purchase of television sets, usually ascribed to both the Eisenhower inauguration in Washington and Elizabeth II's coronation the following year.

The oak of Sandringham, hidden beneath the rich, golden folds of the Standard. The slow flicker of the candles touches gently the gems of the Imperial Crown, even that ruby that Henry wore at Agincourt. It touches the deep, velvet purple of the cushion, and the cool, white flowers of the only wreath that lies upon the flag. How moving can such simplicity be. How real the tears of those who pass by and see it, and come out again, as they do at this moment in unbroken stream, to the cold, dark night and a little privacy for their thoughts ... Never safer, better guarded, lay a sleeping king than this, with a golden candlelight to warm his resting place, and the muffled footsteps of his devoted subjects to keep him company ... How true tonight of George the Faithful is that single sentence spoken by an unknown man of his beloved father: 'The sunset of his death tinged the whole world's sky'

— Richard Dimbleby, BBC radio commentary of the lying in state

At Westminster Hall members of both houses of parliament were present to witness the guardsmen carry the coffin into the hall. The procession into the hall was led by the officers of arms, the Gentleman Usher of the Black Rod (Brian Horrocks), the minister of works (David Eccles), the Earl Marshal, the Lord Great Chamberlain (James Heathcote-Drummond-Willoughby, 3rd Earl of Ancaster) and, immediately in front of the coffin, the Dean of Westminster (Alan Don) and the Archbishop of York (Cyril Garbett). The coffin was followed by Elizabeth II, Queen Mary, Queen Elizabeth the Queen Mother and Princess Margaret (who had all travelled by car from Buckingham Palace) and the Duke of Edinburgh, the Duke and Duchess of Gloucester, the Duchess of Kent and the Princess Royal. The Archbishop conducted a brief service which included the hymn "Abide with Me" at the request of the Queen. During the service, the coffin was guarded by the Honourable Corps of Gentlemen at Arms and the Yeomen of the Guard.

George VI's coffin was afterwards placed on a dais in Westminster Hall, under a vigil guard. The public were permitted to view the coffin and, at times, queued for 4 miles (6.4 km) to do so. Over the next three days some 304,000 people passed through Westminster Hall. The numbers were lower than they had been for George V, which was ascribed to the effects of the widespread television coverage. After the final day of lying in state it took a team of three jewellers two hours to clean the dust off the crown jewels which lay on the coffin, in preparation for the funeral.

== Funeral ==
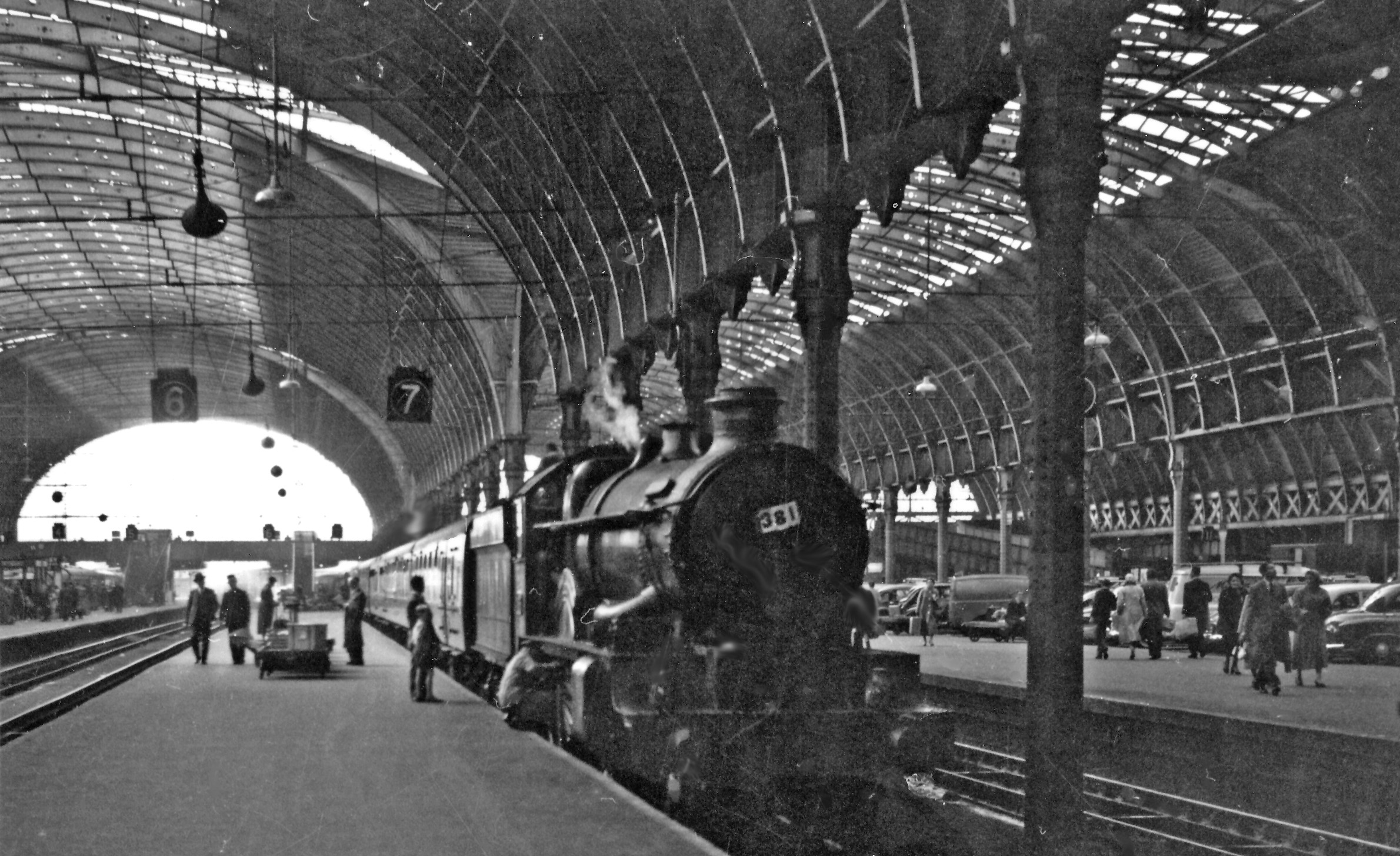
Platform 8 of Paddington Station (far right), pictured in 1963

The funeral of George VI took place on 15 February at St. George's Chapel, Windsor.

Mourners, including representatives of foreign governments, were assembled outside Westminster Hall by 8:15 am. At 9:30 am George VI's coffin was carried from Westminster Hall by eight soldiers of the Grenadier Guards and placed on a gun carriage. The coffin was draped in the royal standard atop which were placed a crown, orb and sceptre as well as his wife's wreath of orchids and lilies of the valley. The coffin was placed on a gun carriage that, as per royal tradition, would be hauled by a party of sailors the 3.5 miles (5.6 km) from New Palace Yard to Paddington Station from where it would travel to Windsor by train. The procession was led by the Central Band of the Royal Air Force and the Band of the Welsh Guards.

Thereafter was a detachment of the RAF and representatives from Commonwealth forces including Northern and Southern Rhodesia, East and West Africa (King's African Rifles and Royal West African Frontier Force), Ceylon, Pakistan, India, South Africa, New Zealand, Australia and Canada. There followed detachments from the units that George VI held the position of colonel-in-chief or honorary colonel, other British Army units, including the bands of the Coldstream Guards, the Irish Guards and the Royal Artillery. There was also a detachment of the Royal Marines (including their band). These were followed by senior foreign and British military officers, including George VI's aides-de-camp. A detachment of the Household Cavalry was followed by the Band of the Scots Guards and the massed pipes of five Scottish and Irish Regiments. Further senior military officials and members of the Royal Household preceded and escorted the coffin, flanked by the Gentleman at Arms and Yeoman of the Guard.

Behind the coffin the Royal Standard was carried by the Household Cavalry in front of the Queen's carriage, which carried Elizabeth II, Queen Elizabeth the Queen Mother, Princess Margaret and the Princess Royal. They were followed on foot by four royal dukes: Edinburgh, Gloucester, Windsor (George VI's brother, the former King Edward VIII) and Kent (Prince Edward, grandson of George V) and senior military and royal household figures.

Behind them walked the kings of Denmark (Frederik IX), Greece (Paul) and Sweden (Gustaf VI Adolf) and the President of France (Vincent Auriol), at the head of a group of 20 foreign heads of state. They were followed by the High Commissioners of Commonwealth states and the representatives of foreign delegations. Six carriages carried British and foreign female dignitaries after which were more members of the Royal Household, a detachment of the King's Flight, further foreign dignitaries and representatives of their armed forces. There followed the Band of the Corps of Royal Engineers and a police band, ahead of detachments from every police force in the country and representatives of the colonial police forces. The rear of the procession was made up of representatives from the fire services and the Civil Defence Corps. During the parade a 56-gun salute was fired, one round for each year of the king's life. Likewise, Big Ben was rung 56 times, one for each year of the king's life.

Acheson, in a report to the United States House Committee on Foreign Affairs complained about the waiting around at the start of the day and the slow pace of the procession, which took 3 hours and ten minutes to reach the station. He commented on the silence and stillness shown by the crowd, whom he called "solid, courageous, but tired people."

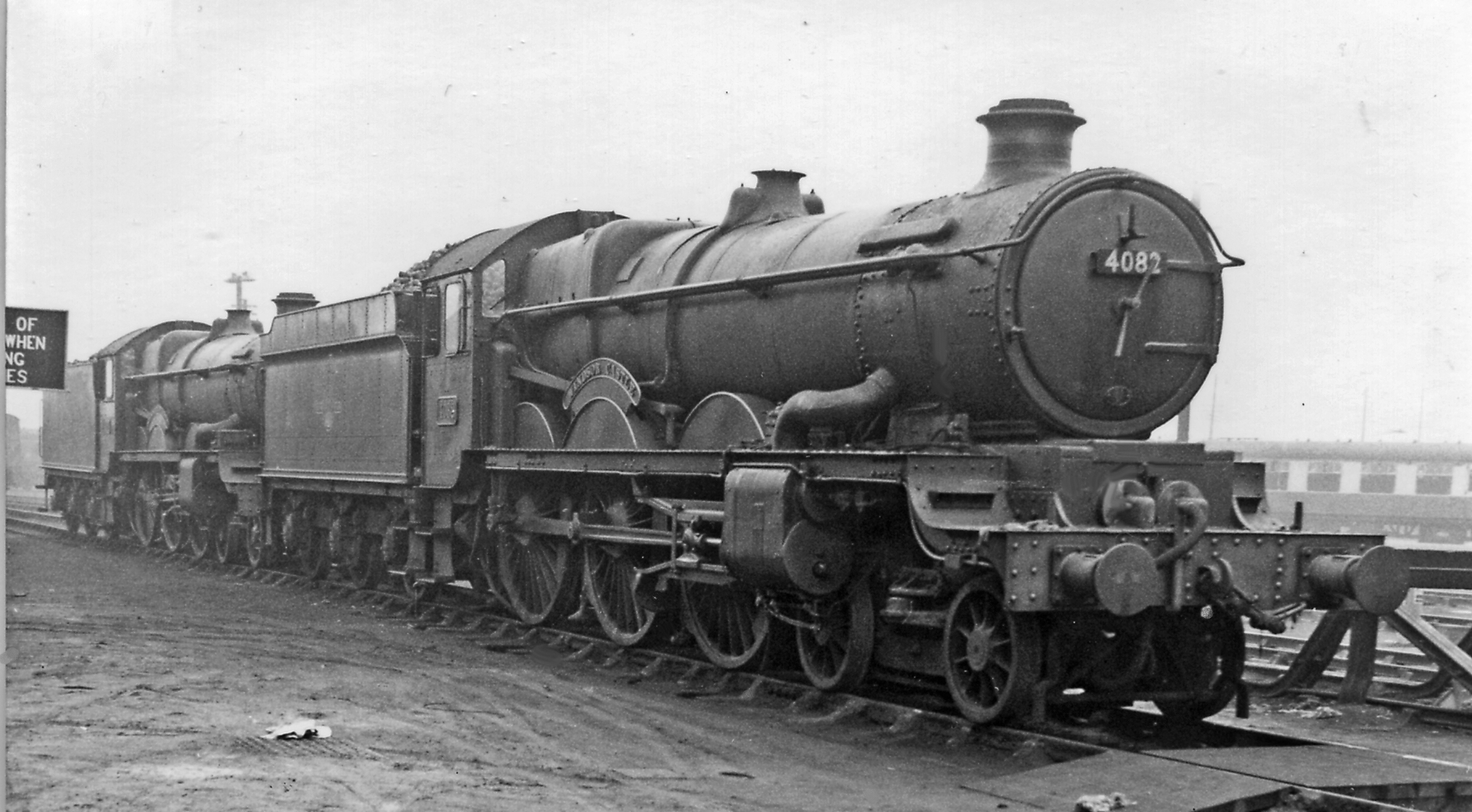
The GWR 4073 Class locomotive 7013 Bristol Castle, which drew the royal funeral train under the nameplates of 4082 Windsor Castle

The route was lined with soldiers, sailors and airmen of the British forces, standing with arms reversed. The procession passed along Whitehall, where the Cenotaph was saluted, and later passed through Hyde Park to Marble Arch and along Edgware Road. The party including coffin and carriage processed onto platform 8 at Paddington. The Queen's party dismounted to watch the coffin carried onto the royal train by eight guardsmen. The royal family boarded the same train and other guests followed in a separate one. The train was pulled by GWR 4073 Class locomotive 7013 Bristol Castle, though it carried the nameplates of classmate 4082 Windsor Castle. The latter was considered a more appropriate choice as it was named for the royal residence and had once been driven by George V but was unavailable on the day of the funeral. As a mark of respect the Royal Air Force was grounded during the time of the funeral. On one transatlantic flight from London to New York, in air during the time of the funeral, all of the passengers rose from their seats and bowed their heads in acknowledgement.

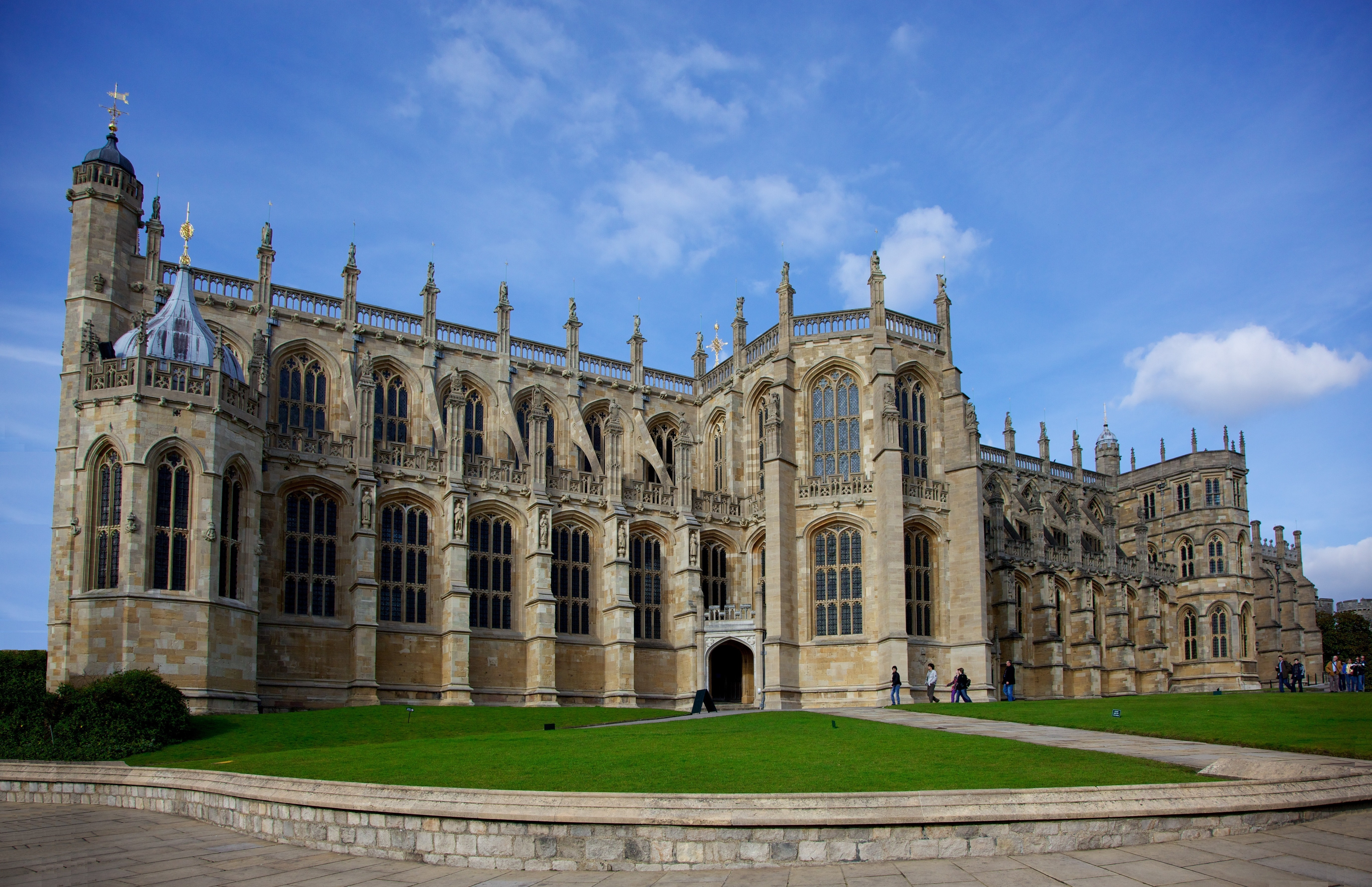
St George's Chapel, Windsor Castle

At Windsor the coffin was taken from the train and hauled, as in London, by sailors on a gun carriage through the town to St George's Chapel in Windsor Castle. This procession was similar to the one in London, though smaller. It moved along the road (today the B3022) from the station past the castle and St John the Baptist Church before turning into Park Street at the Soldier's Statue and eventually moving up the Long Walk towards the castle. The coffin's arrival at the Royal Chapel was marked by naval petty officers piping the admiral over the side. Following the coffin, carried again by eight guardsmen, up the chapel steps, Elizabeth II gave way to usual precedence in allowing her mother to proceed ahead of her. Television cameras were excluded from the funeral inside the chapel, however it was broadcast on radio by the BBC and NBC. The service was presided over by the Archbishop of Canterbury, Geoffrey Fisher, and the Archbishop of York, Cyril Garbett Also present were the Bishop of Winchester (Alwyn Williams), who read the lesson, and the Dean of Windsor (Eric Hamilton).

The music for the service included the last funeral sentence from the Book of Common Prayer, "I heard a Voice from Heaven", in a new setting by William Henry Harris, the organist and director of music at the chapel. Other music included the hymn "The Strife is O'er, the Battle Done" and the anthem, "God be in my head and in my understanding" in a setting by Walford Davies, which was sung after the Garter Principal King of Arms had proclaimed the late king's style and titles. Elizabeth II placed the king's colour of the Grenadier Guards on the coffin at the end of the service. The recessional voluntary was Hubert Parry's prelude to "Ye boundless realms of joy", which had been specifically requested by Elizabeth II to end the service on a hopeful rather than mournful note.

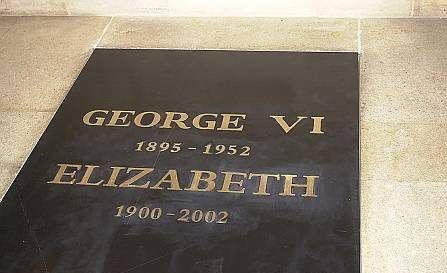
The former ledger stone naming George VI and his wife Elizabeth in the memorial chapel, as it appeared before replacement after the interment of Elizabeth II and her husband Philip in September 2022

Floral tributes were left outside the chapel; Churchill laid one on behalf of the British government, on the card of which he wrote "for valour", the phrase engraved on the Victoria Cross, Britain's highest military award for gallantry. George VI was buried within the Royal Vault of St George's Chapel. During the burial, the Lord Chamberlain had carried out the tradition of symbolically breaking his staff of office, actually by unscrewing a joint in the middle, and placing half on the coffin. Finally, Elizabeth II dropped in a handful of earth from Windsor.

== Guests ==
As per report in London Gazette.

=== British royal family ===
==== The House of Windsor ====
- Queen Elizabeth the Queen Mother, the late King's widow
  - The Queen and the Duke of Edinburgh, the late King's daughter and son-in-law
  - The Princess Margaret, the late King's daughter
- Queen Mary, the late King's mother
  - The Duke of Windsor, the late King's brother and predecessor
  - The Princess Royal, the late King's sister
    - The Earl and Countess of Harewood, the late King's nephew and niece-in-law
    - The Hon. Gerald Lascelles, the late King's nephew
  - The Duke and Duchess of Gloucester, the late King's brother and sister-in law
  - The Duchess of Kent, the late King's sister-in law (also second cousin)
    - The Duke of Kent, the late King's nephew
- The Earl of Southesk, widower of the late King's first cousin
  - Lord Carnegie, the late King's first cousin once removed
- Princess Marie Louise, the late King's first cousin once removed
- Lady Patricia and The Hon. Sir Alexander Ramsay, the late King's first cousin once removed and her husband
  - Alexander Ramsay, the late King's second cousin

==== Mountbatten family ====
- The Dowager Marchioness of Milford Haven, widow of the late King's second cousin
  - The Marquess of Milford Haven, the late King's second cousin once removed
- The Earl and Countess Mountbatten of Burma, the late King's second cousin and his wife
- The Marquess and Marchioness of Carisbrooke, the late King's first cousin once removed and his wife

==== Teck-Cambridge family ====
- The Marquess and Marchioness of Cambridge, the late King's first cousin and his wife
- The Duchess and Duke of Beaufort, the late King's first cousin and her husband
- Lady Helena Gibbs, the late King's first cousin

=== Foreign royalty ===
- The King of Norway, the late King's paternal uncle by marriage (also first cousin once removed)
  - The Crown Prince of Norway, the late King's first cousin
    - Princess Astrid of Norway, the late King's first cousin once removed
- The King and Queen of Denmark, the late King's second cousins
- The King of the Hellenes, the late King's double second cousin
- The King of Sweden, husband of the late King's second cousin (also widower of the late King's first cousin once removed)
- Prince Axel of Denmark, the late King's first cousin once removed
  - Prince Georg of Denmark, the late King's second cousin (also husband of the late King's niece by marriage)
- Prince Ernest Augustus of Hanover, the late King's second cousin
- The Prince of Liège, the late King's second cousin once removed (representing the King of the Belgians)
- The Grand Duchess and Prince of Luxembourg, the late King's third cousin and her husband
- The Queen and Prince of the Netherlands
- The King of Iraq
  - Prince Zeid bin Hussein
- The Crown Prince of Jordan (representing the King of Jordan)
- The Crown Prince of Ethiopia (representing the Emperor of Ethiopia)
- Prince Ali Reza (representing the Shah of Iran)
- Marshall Sardar Shah Wali Khan (representing the King of Afghanistan)
- Prince Bửu Lộc (representing the Chief of State of Vietnam)
- Prince Wan Waithayakon (representing the King of Thailand)
- Prince Muhammad Abdel Moneim (representing the King of Egypt)
- Princess Pingpeang Yukanthor (representing the King of Cambodia)
- Queen Victoria Eugenie, the late King's first cousin once removed
  - Count and Countess of Barcelona, the late King's second cousin once removed and his wife
  - Duke and Duchess of Anjou and Segovia, the late King's second cousin once removed and his wife

=== Nobility ===
- The Duke of Norfolk
- The Duke of Buccleuch
- The Duke of Hamilton and Brandon
- The Dowager Duchess of Northumberland
- The Earl of Ancaster
- The Earl of Cork and Orrery
- The Earl Fortescue
- The Earl of Onslow
- The Earl of Leicester
- The Earl of Eldon
- The Earl of Birkenhead
- The Earl of Selkirk
- The Earl of Airlie
- The Viscount Portal of Hungerford
- The Viscount Alanbrooke
- The Viscount Montgomery of Alamein
- The Viscount Allendale
- The Lord Douglas of Kirtleside
- The Lord Newall
- The Lord Tedder
- The Lord Ironside
- The Lord Hardinge of Penshurst
- The Lord Tovey
- The Lord Chatfield
- The Lord Plunket
- The Lord Lloyd
- The Lord Tryon
- Viscount Althorp
- The Master of Sinclair
- The Hon. Michael Fitzalan-Howard
- The Hon. Neville Wigram
- The Hon. Martin Charteris

=== Other guests ===
- The Hon. Mrs. Andrew Elphinstone, wife of the late king's nephew by marriage
- Winston Churchill, Prime Minister of the United Kingdom
- Clement Attlee, Leader of the Opposition and former Prime Minister of the United Kingdom
- Sir Philip Nichols, British Ambassador to the Netherlands
- Sir Thomas White, Australian High Commissioner to the United Kingdom
- Alfons Gorbach, Third President of the National Council of Austria
- Adolfo Costa du Rels, Bolivian Ambassador to France
- José Joaquim Moniz de Aragão, Ambassador of Brazil
- L. Dana Wilgress, Canadian High Commissioner to the United Kingdom
- Aureliano Sánchez Arango, Foreign Minister of Cuba
- Hafiz Wahba, Ambassador of Egypt
- José Castellanos Contreras, former Consul General of El Salvador
- General Abiye Abebe of Ethiopia
- Sakari Tuomioja, Foreign Minister of Finland
- Vincent Auriol, President of France
- Alphonse Juin, Chief of the Defence Staff of France
- Robert Schuman, Foreign Minister of France
- Franck Lavaud, former President of Haiti
- Paolo Giobbe, Apostolic Nuncio to the Netherlands
- V. K. Krishna Menon, Indian High Commissioner to the United Kingdom
- Subandrio, Ambassador of Indonesia
- Frank Aiken, Minister for External Affairs of Ireland
- Frederick Boland, Ambassador of Ireland
- Moshe Sharett, Foreign Minister of Israel
- Giovanni Gronchi, President of the Chamber of Deputies of Italy
- Leonardo Severi, President of the Italian Council of State
- Ourot R. Souvannavong, representing the King of Laos
- Gabriel Lafayette Dennis, Foreign Minister of Liberia
- Wahbi al-Bouri of Libya
- Joseph Bech, Minister for Defence of Luxembourg
- Baber Shumsher Jung Bahadur Rana, former Minister of Defense of Nepal
- Dirk Stikker, Foreign Minister of the Netherlands
- William George Stevens, Secretary to the New Zealand High Commissioner
- Ricardo Rivera Schreiber, Ambassador of Peru
- Georgy Zarubin, Ambassador of the Soviet Union
- Alberto Martín-Artajo, Foreign Minister of Spain
- Celâl Bayar, President of Turkey
- Konrad Adenauer, Chancellor of West Germany
- Dean Acheson, United States Secretary of State
- Ivan Ribar, President of the Presidium of the Yugoslav Republic

=== Prominent absences ===
The Belgian King Baudouin refused to attend: this was believed to be on the advice of his father, the former king Leopold III, who held a grudge against the British prime minister Winston Churchill. Churchill had criticised Leopold for remaining in Nazi-occupied Belgium during the Second World War, rather than escaping to lead a government in exile. Baudouin went on to attend the funeral of Queen Mary in 1953. George VI's daughter and successor Elizabeth II did attend the funeral of King Baudouin in 1993: this was the only foreign state funeral she ever personally attended as sovereign.

Despite attending some aspects of royal proceedings, Queen Mary, then aged 84, was too old to attend her son's interment, but she did watch the funeral procession from the windows of Marlborough House. George VI was her third son that predeceased her, after Prince John and Prince George, and those around her said that of the three it was the loss that affected her the most.

US President Harry S. Truman did not attend the funeral upon agreement with Secretary of State Dean Acheson, who had planned his trip to London for meetings on issues pertaining to Germany one week before the king died. London wanted to see Truman, but British Foreign Secretary Anthony Eden asked Acheson, Robert Schuman, and Konrad Adenauer to come to London to work out a Western Big Three agreement to bring Germany into the European defence organisation ahead of a NATO conference in Lisbon. In addition, Acheson also met with key American officials on the issues.

Wallis, Duchess of Windsor was not invited and stayed in America. The royal family still held resentment towards her stemming from the abdication crisis of 1936, especially Queen Mary and Queen Elizabeth the Queen Mother. The Duke and Duchess of Windsor were in New York at the time of the King's death, and discovered the news belatedly from journalists at the Waldorf-Astoria, much to the Duke's grievance. He was firmly told that Wallis would not be received by the royal family and that he would have to attend the funeral alone. A similar situation occurred a year later after the death of Queen Mary, who never wrote to the Duchess and remained stoic in her view towards her. Queen Elizabeth the Queen Mother held a similar feeling and blamed the Duchess for contributing to the King's declining health; his reluctant coronation and shouldering the burden of the war contributed to his heavy smoking. She remained reluctant to meet the Duchess when she visited the UK with the Duke in 1967, and the meeting was tense; she met her only once more in 1972, on the morning of the Duke's funeral.

== Later events ==
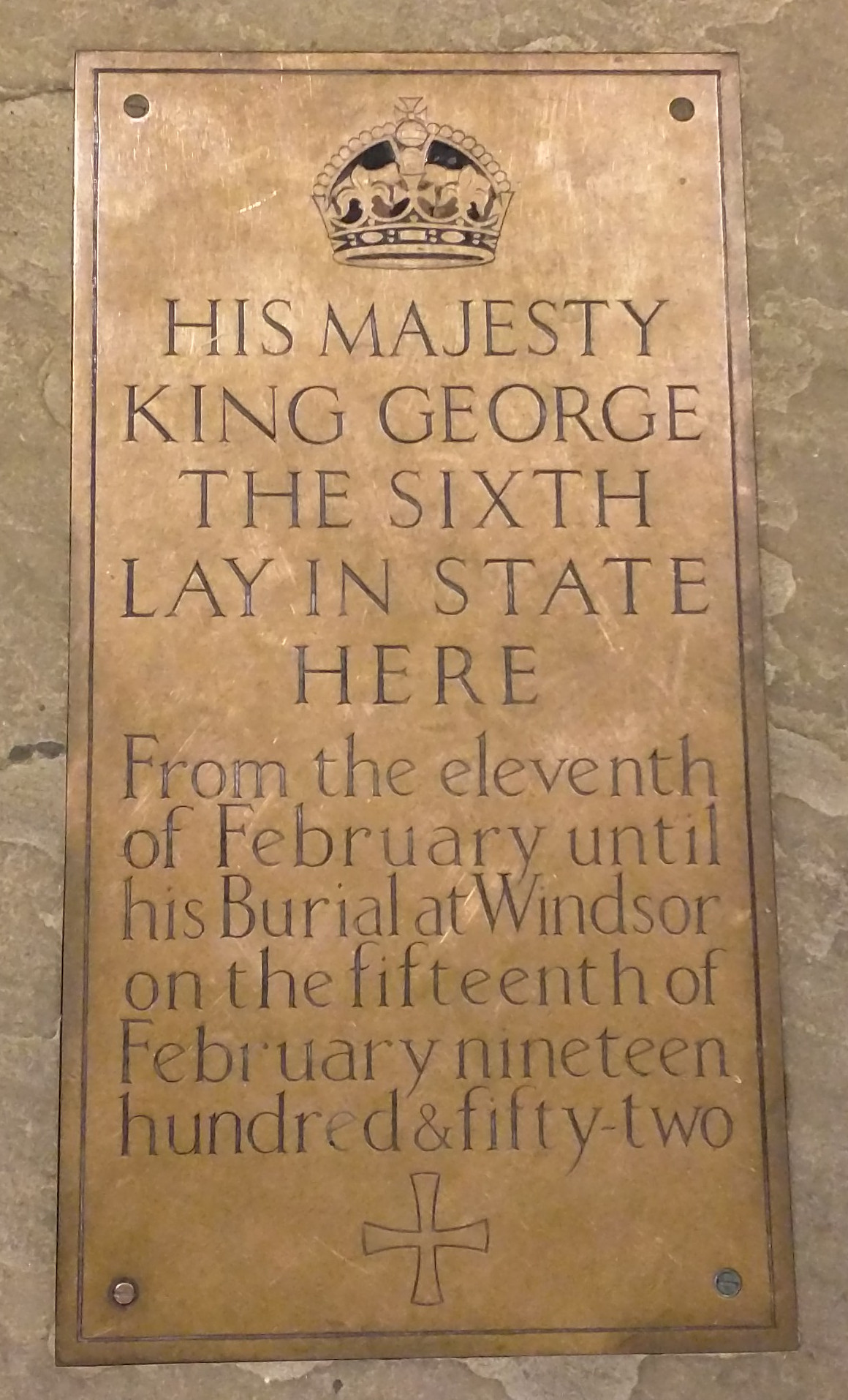
A plaque in Westminster Hall commemorating the lying in state

Three days after the funeral, George VI's widow, Queen Elizabeth the Queen Mother issued a statement thanking the nation and commending to them "our dear Daughter", Queen Elizabeth II.

A 47-page report was written after the funeral to recommend improvements for the next royal funeral. Suggestions included attaching metal rollers to the catafalque to make a smoother landing of the coffin; as it was lead lined, it weighed around a quarter of a ton. The coronation of Elizabeth II took place on 2 June 1953; unlike at the funeral, she permitted BBC cameras to film the event; this was a landmark in British television history.

The body of George VI was moved from the Royal Vault on 26 March 1969 and reinterred in the newly-built King George VI Memorial Chapel. His daughter, Princess Margaret, died on 9 February 2002 and, in accordance with her wishes, a private funeral was held at St George's Chapel. This took place on 15 February 2002, the 50th anniversary of her father's funeral and Margaret was afterwards cremated and her ashes placed in the Royal Vault. Queen Elizabeth, who became known as the Queen Mother to distinguish her from her daughter, died on 30 March 2002. Like her husband she lay in state at Westminster Hall. After a funeral at Westminster Abbey she was buried next to her husband in the King George VI Memorial Chapel on 9 April 2002. At the same time the ashes of Princess Margaret were also transferred to the chapel. On 19 September 2022, Elizabeth II and her husband Prince Philip were interred alongside them in the Chapel.

== See also ==
- Death and state funeral of Queen Victoria
- Death and state funeral of Edward VII
- Death and state funeral of George V
- Death and state funeral of Elizabeth II
- State funerals in the United Kingdom
