= Karl Gerok (disambiguation) =

Karl Gerok may refer to:

- Karl Gerok (1815–1890), German theologian and lyricist
- Karl Ludwig Gerok (1906–1975), German organist and composer
- Friedrich von Gerok (officer), sometimes known by his first given name, Karl
