= Angel Voices, Ever Singing =

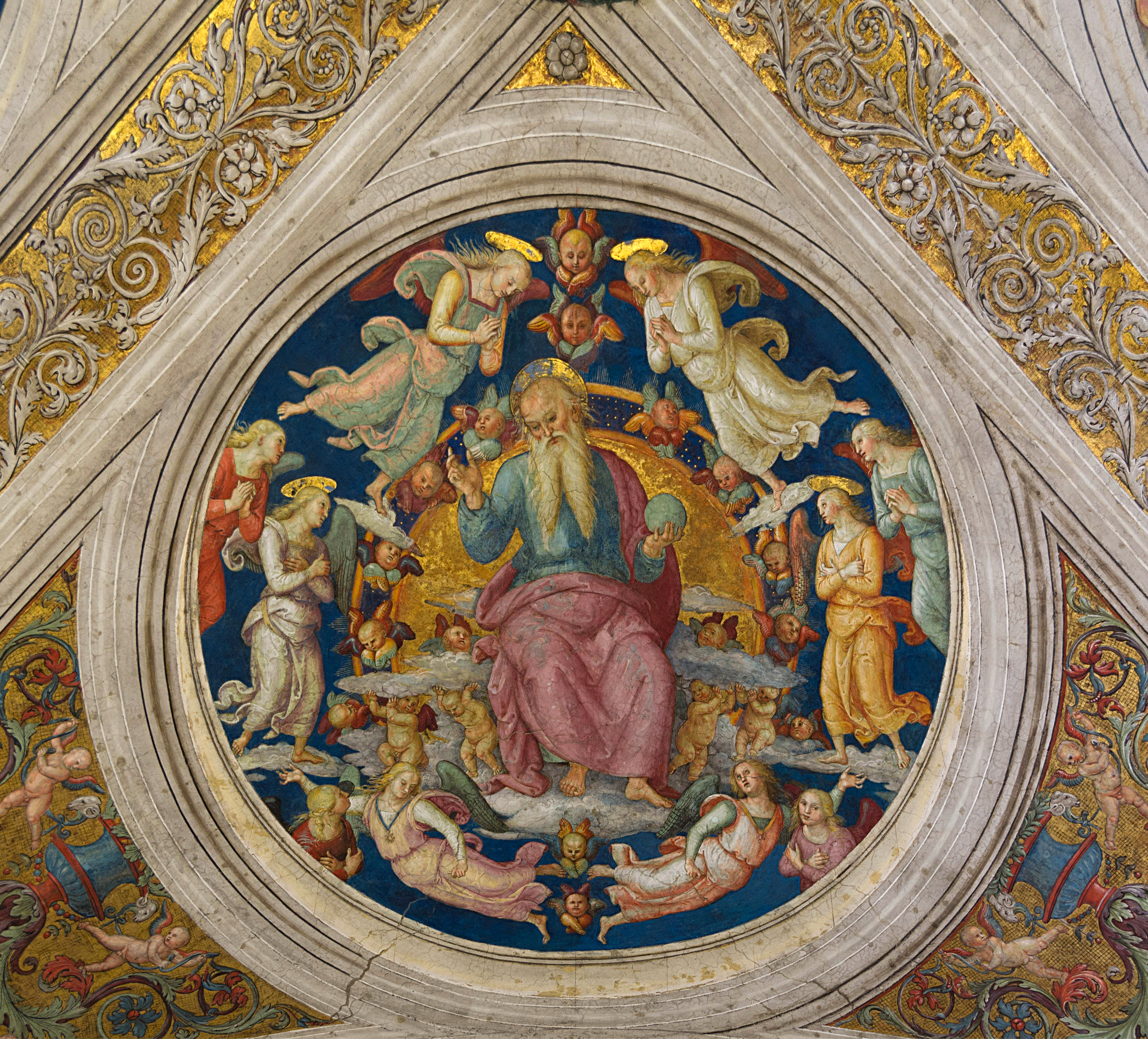
- God the Father and angels - detail of ceiling in the Raphael Rooms in Vatican City by Pietro Perugino
- Written: 1861
- Text: by Francis Pott
- Meter: 85 85 87
- Melody: "Angel Voices"
- Published: 1866
- #336 in the NEH

"Angel Voices, Ever Singing" is an English Christian hymn. It was written in 1861 by the Church of England vicar Francis Pott (1832–1909). It was written for the dedication of an organ.

== Text ==
The hymn's words were written by Rev. Francis Pott, a Church of England priest, while he was vicar of St Mary's Church, Ticehurst in Sussex. The text is a typical Victorian evocation of the Biblical vision of angels gathered around the Throne of God in Heaven, ceaselessly singing in praise of God.

== History ==
Pott was invited by William Macrorie, the future Bishop of Maritzburg in what would become South Africa, to compose a hymn to commemorate the installation and dedication of a new organ at St John's Church in Wingates, Lancashire. Pott wrote it at Brasenose College in Oxford, Oxfordshire. Pott set the hymn to the newly written tune called "Angel Voices" by his friend Edwin George Monk as they collaborated to create "Angel Voices, Ever Singing". It was originally titled "For the Dedication of an Organ or for a Meeting of Choirs".

Pott then published "Angel Voices, Ever Singing" in 1866 in his Hymns fitted to the Order of Common Prayer hymnal. The hymn eventually gained popularity in the United Kingdom and in the United States. In 1872, Arthur Sullivan wrote a separate tune, which was also called "Angel Voices" for the hymn. Though it gained popularity in the United States and was published with it, Pott did not like Sullivan's tune and banned it from being published alongside his words. He stated "I am afraid that some of its popularity arose from Sullivan having, contrary to my desire, set it in The Hymnary to a pretty, trivial but altogether unfit tune of his own – which caught the ear of people who did not trouble themselves to see that the hymn was of quite another character. In giving permission since for the printing of the hymn I have always made it a condition that Sullivan’s tune shall not be in any way referred to". Due to Pott's ban of Sullivan's tune being published with the words, "Angel Voices, Ever Singing" has predominantly been played using Monk's "Angel Voices" tune up to the 21st century.

"Angel Voices, Ever Singing" is in several popular hymnals, including Hymns Ancient and Modern (1983 New Standard Edition, no. 163), Hymns and Psalms (no. 484) and The New English Hymnal (no. 336).
