= Myra Kathleen Hughes =

Irish artist

- Born: September 9, 1877; Wexford, County Wexford, Ireland
- Died: 21 August 1918 (aged 40); Surrey, United Kingdom
- Known for: painting and etching

Myra Kathleen Hughes (9 September 1877 – 21 August 1918) was an Irish artist and etcher, best known for her series Vanishing London.

== Early life ==
Myra Kathleen Hughes was born in Polehore, Wexford on 9 September 1877. She came from a wealthy military family. Her father was Sir Frederick Hughes of Rosslare Fort and Barntown House who served in the 7th Madras Light Cavalry. She had 2 brothers and 4 sisters. She attended the Westminster School of Art, going on to study etching and engraving under Frank Short and Constance Mary Pott at the Royal College of Art in London, living the rest of her life in London.

== Professional career ==
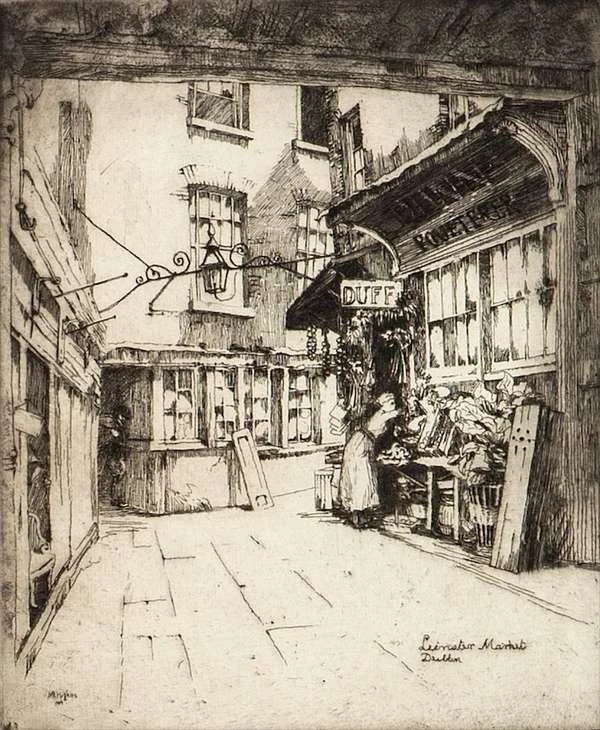
"Leinster Market", 1909 etching by Myra Kathleen Hughes

She was elected an associate of the Royal Society of Painter Etchers and Engravers in 1911, making her one of only 35 women in the 258 membership. She later served as president of the society. She exhibited with the Royal Society of Painter Etchers and Engravers as well as the Royal Academy and the Dudley Galleries, the Royal Hibernian Academy, the Watercolour Society of Ireland and the Dublin Sketching Club. She was considered one of the leading artists of the British Etching revival.

Hughes's work focused on en plein air studies of both natural and urban landscapes. One of her most popular series was Vanishing London, which were etchings of London landmark buildings she captured before they were demolished. She is considered to be an accomplished draughtsman, and was one of a small number or artists who experimented with colour printing at the turn of the 20th century. In 1917, she travelled to Palestine, writing and illustrating the book, Impressions of Palestine. She contracted tuberculosis there, from which she died at Hindhead, Surrey on 21 August 1918.

== Legacy ==
The British Museum holds the largest collection of her prints, which were donated after her death by her family through Mary C. Hamilton. The National Gallery of Ireland holds two prints by Hughes, one of which depicts College Green, Dublin. Trinity College Dublin holds a series of 5 etchings by Hughes which depict the college grounds.
