= Robert Corbet Singleton =

Robert Corbet Singleton (1810–1881) was Warden of St. Columba’s College, Dublin, subsequently First Warden of St. Peter’s College, Radley, and a noted writer and translator of hymns. He was born on 9 October 1810 in Ireland and died on 7 February 1881 in York, England.

== Family background and education ==
Singleton was the second son of Francis Corbet of County Adare, Meath. He followed his father in taking the name Corbet Singleton.

R.C. Singleton was educated at Trinity College, Dublin, graduating with a BA in 1830, and awarded his MA in 1833.

== St Columba's College, Dublin ==
Singleton was a teacher of mathematics, but he loved music and Latin. On the best of terms with William Sewell, he was instrumental in setting up St Columba's College, Stackallan, near Dublin, and became its first Warden when the college opened in 1843, although owing to a subsequent dispute were never recognised as founders. Also on the staff, soon afterwards, at St Columba's, was music master Edwin Monk, with whom Singleton was subsequently to work also at Radley; the two of them still later collaborating in the making of a hymnal at York more than two decades later.

In 1850 Singleton noted in his diary that the school's boys were "bold, manly and vigorous at their games...very proud of their college". Singleton explained that to be a successful teacher a man "must be something of a gentleman...it would never do... to induce the boys to look down on him". Perhaps his brother too was Samuel Singleton, elected a member of Common Room in 1848. A stickler for truth and honesty Singleton was an exacting employer, finding it hard to recruit staff.

Singleton's resignation from St Columba's in 1846 followed a controversy after he insisted on a rigorous regime of fasting for the boys.

== Oxford and Radley ==
Singleton moved to Oxford where he was admitted in 1847 to Trinity College. With William Sewell, who had supported him at St Columba’s, he was to become co-founder of St Peter’s College, Radley, being appointed the first Warden of Radley on 9 June 1847.

Singleton was committed, as before, to a monastic and ascetic regime for the boys at Radley, at odds, it has been noted, with Sewell’s "more relaxed, arcadian approach to education." This led ultimately to Singleton’s resignation as Warden in 1851 – whereat Sewell began a "systematic removal" of Singleton’s name as a co-founder of Radley College. There was in consequence no lasting memorial to Singleton at Radley prior to the naming of the Singleton Library at the centenary in 1947.

Singleton had been the second most significant benefactor of St Columba’s, and he was as generous in the founding of Radley. Between St Columba’s and Radley it was estimated that his gifts amounted to £30,000. At Radley, he gave the first organ, which was lent for the International Exhibition in Dublin in 1853.

While at Radley Singleton published The Psalter Arranged for Chanting (1847), and discourses entitled Uncleanness, the Ruin of Body and Soul (1850).

== Via Ireland to York ==
Following his resignation from Radley, Singleton returned to Kingstown in Ireland, where he lived with his mother. Following her death, he moved to York, purchasing Minster Court.

It was here that he continued his long acquaintance and collaboration with Edwin Monk, who had been Precentor at both St Columba’s and Radley, and who was now Organist and Master of Choristers at York Minster. In 1868 he and Monk published their jointly-edited book, The Anglican Hymn-Book. The collection included nearly thirty original hymns by Singleton, notable amongst them being his With gladsome feet we press. Singleton also translated a number of hymns from Latin and German.

As classicist, Singleton published a complete verse translation of the works of Virgil.

Robert Singleton died at Petergate, York, on 7 February 1881. The choir of St Columba’s College sang at the funeral service: he was buried on 12 February in the Corbet vault at St Patrick’s Cathedral in Dublin.
