= 56 Brook Green =

Building in Hammersmith, London, England

Coordinates: 51.495664°N 0.21728019°W

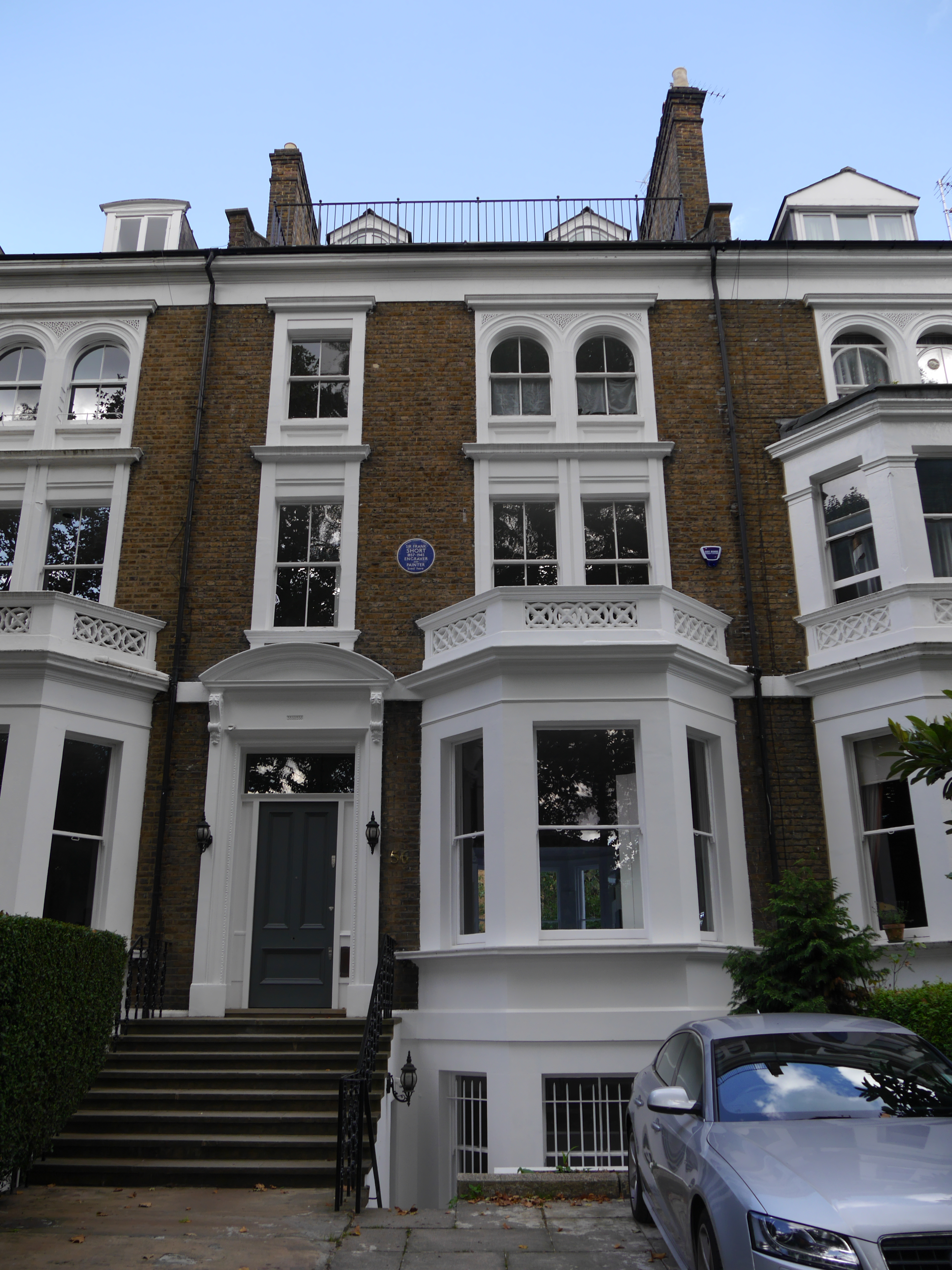
56 Brook Green, London

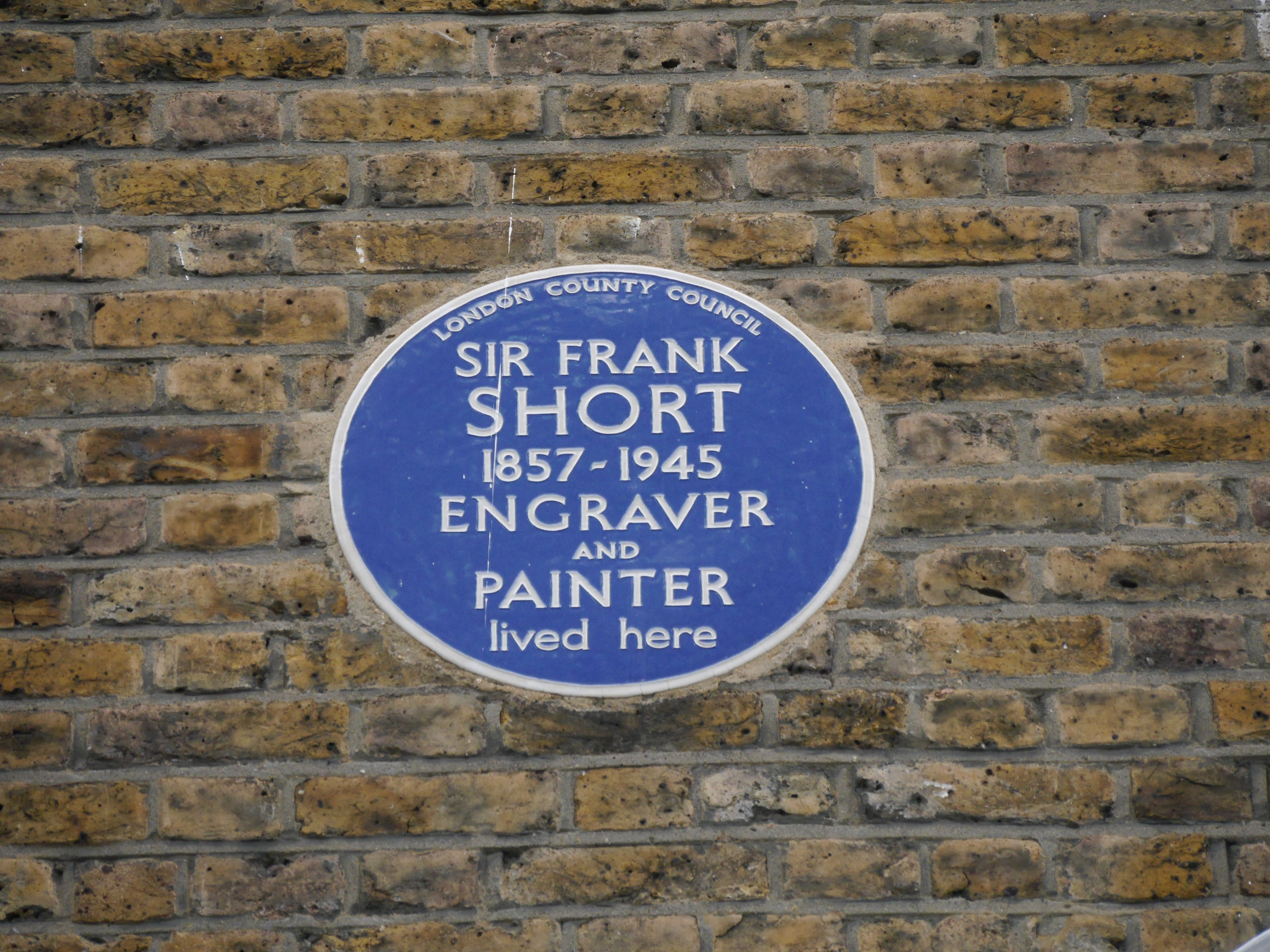
Blue plaque, 56 Brook Green

56 Brook Green is a Grade II listed building at 56 Brook Green, Hammersmith, London, W6 7BJ.

The house dates from the mid-19th century. It was lived in by the printmaker and artist Frank Short.
