= Gelobt sei Gott im höchsten Thron =

Hymn for Easter in 20 stanzas in German

- Hymn by Melchior Vulpius
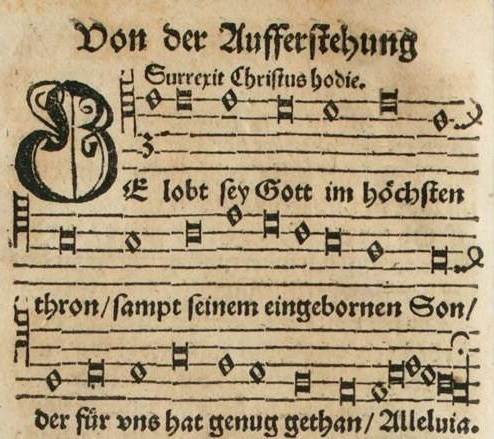
- Setting of "Gelobt sei Gott im höchsten Thron" to the tune Surrexit Christus hodie from Ein Gesangbuch der Brüder inn Behemen vnd Merherrn (Nürnberg 1544)
- English: "Good Christians All, Rejoice and Sing"
- Occasion: Easter
- Text: by Michael Weiße
- Language: German
- Published: 1531 (text and first tune); 1609 (tune)

"Gelobt sei Gott im höchsten Thron" (literally: Praised be God on highest throne) is a hymn for Easter in 20 stanzas in German by Michael Weiße, widely known with a later melody by Melchior Vulpius. Shortened, it is part of current Protestant and Catholic German hymnals.

== History ==
Weiße published his text in 1531 in his hymnal Ein New Gesengbuchlen for the Bohemian Brethren, with a melody known from the beginning of the 15th century and used in Czech congregations in Bohemian Hussite hymnals. Weiße structured the text in three parts, two stanzas of praise, fifteen stanzas of narration, and three stanzas of prayer to Jesus. Each stanza consists of three rhyming lines in similar meter, and a "Halleluja" refrain.

In 1609, the hymn appeared in the Lutheran hymnal Ein schön geistlich Gesangbuch by Melchior Vulpius from Weimar, who composed a different tune and two harmonisations, one for four parts, one for five parts. With this melody, the hymn became widely known in the 19th century by publication in the hymnals of Johann Gottlieb Tucher and Philipp Wackernagel. The number of stanzas was reduced considerably, because of less interest in a long narration and a focus on the Passion.

The hymn was translated to English in several versions, for example "Good Christians All, Rejoice and Sing" by Cyril A. Alington in 1931. Other hymns sung to the tune "Gelobt sei Gott" include "O Lord of Life, Where'er They Be".

In the current German Protestant hymnal Evangelisches Gesangbuch (EG), the hymn is number 103. It has one stanza of praise, three stanzas of narration and two of prayer. Praise and narration correspond to stanzas 1, 4, 9 and 10 of the first version, the two stanzas of praise are derived from the three stanzas in the long version. The first melody still appears in the EG, as number 105, with the text "Erstanden ist der heilig Christ" (Risen is the holy Christ), based on the Latin "Surrexit Christus Hodie". "Gelobt sei Gott im höchsten Thron", the same six stanzas as in the EG, is part of the Catholic hymnal Gotteslob (GL), number 218 in the old version, number 328 in the current version.

== Music ==
The first melody is in triple meter. A version by Valentin Triller (1555) adds syncopes to accent the ends of the first and third line, as elements of folk music. The tune was well known, probably also by Vulpius (whose setting is transcribed below) who used the same features. The strongest influence on his composition are Italian balletti, such as by Giovanni Giacomo Gastoldi and Hans Leo Hassler. The repeated "Halleluja" is similar to the "fa-la-la" refrain of some balletti, adding a dancing swing.

Several composers have used Vulpius's melody, some also the text of "Gelobt sei Gott". In 1925, an arrangement of the tune by the English composer Henry George Ley was published in the hymnal Songs of Praise as a setting for the hymn "The Strife is O'er, the Battle Done" by Francis Pott.

The melody is also part of Ernst Pepping's Großes Orgelbuch (Great Organ Book), which contains preludes and chorale fantasias, in volume 3 for Easter, Ascension and Pentecost. Karl Ludwig Gerok wrote a chorale prelude, which was included in the collection Schwäbische Orgelromantik, together with 14 other preludes. Petr Eben's Evangelische Choräle / aus dem Kanzional der Böhmischen Brüder: Choralbearbeitungen und Improvisationsmodelle (Ten Preludes on Chorales of the Bohemian Brethren), composed between 1971 and 1973 and published in 2002 by Universal Edition, contain Vulpius's original melody. In 1975, Egil Hovland also composed a Chorale Partita No. 6 – "Gelobt sei Gott im höchsten Thron", Op. 90.
