= Friedrich von Gerok =

German theologian

Friedrich von Gerok (19 November 1786, in Weilheim – 2 July 1865, in Stuttgart) was a German theologian.

After studying Gerok began his professional career in 1806, and from 1809 to 1811 he was librarian at Tübingen. From 1811 to 1814 he was assistant to the professor of classical literature at the University of Tübingen. In 1813 and 1814 he was a deacon in Vaihingen an der Enz and in 1815 at the Stuttgart Collegiate. In 1836 he was deacon and preacher at the hospital in Stuttgart. In 1848 he was appointed General Superintendent in Ludwigsburg, a position he held until his retirement in 1860.

In 1853 Gerok was awarded the Knight's Cross of the Order of the Württemberg Crown. He was the father of Karl von Gerok.
