= Francis Pott (hymnwriter) =

English hymnwriter and Anglican priest

- Born: 29 December 1832; Southwark, London
- Died: 26 October 1909 (aged 76); Kent, England
- Education: Brasenose College, Oxford
- Occupations: Hymnwriter, Anglican priest
- Known for: "Angel Voices, Ever Singing"; "The Strife is O'er, the Battle Done"

Francis Pott (29 December 1832 – 26 October 1909) was an English hymnwriter and Anglican priest. He is noted as the author or translator of a number of popular Christian hymns including "Angel Voices, Ever Singing" and "The Strife is O'er, the Battle Done". His hymns are an established part of the Anglican church music repertoire and commonly feature in hymnals such as The New English Hymnal.

== Early life ==
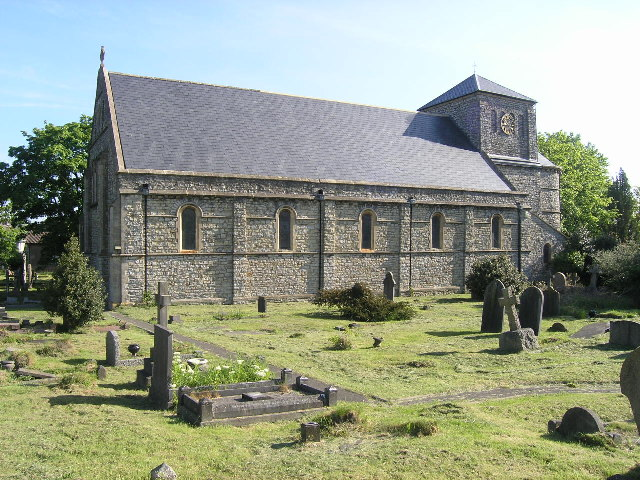
Pott served a curacy at Bishopsworth, 1856-8

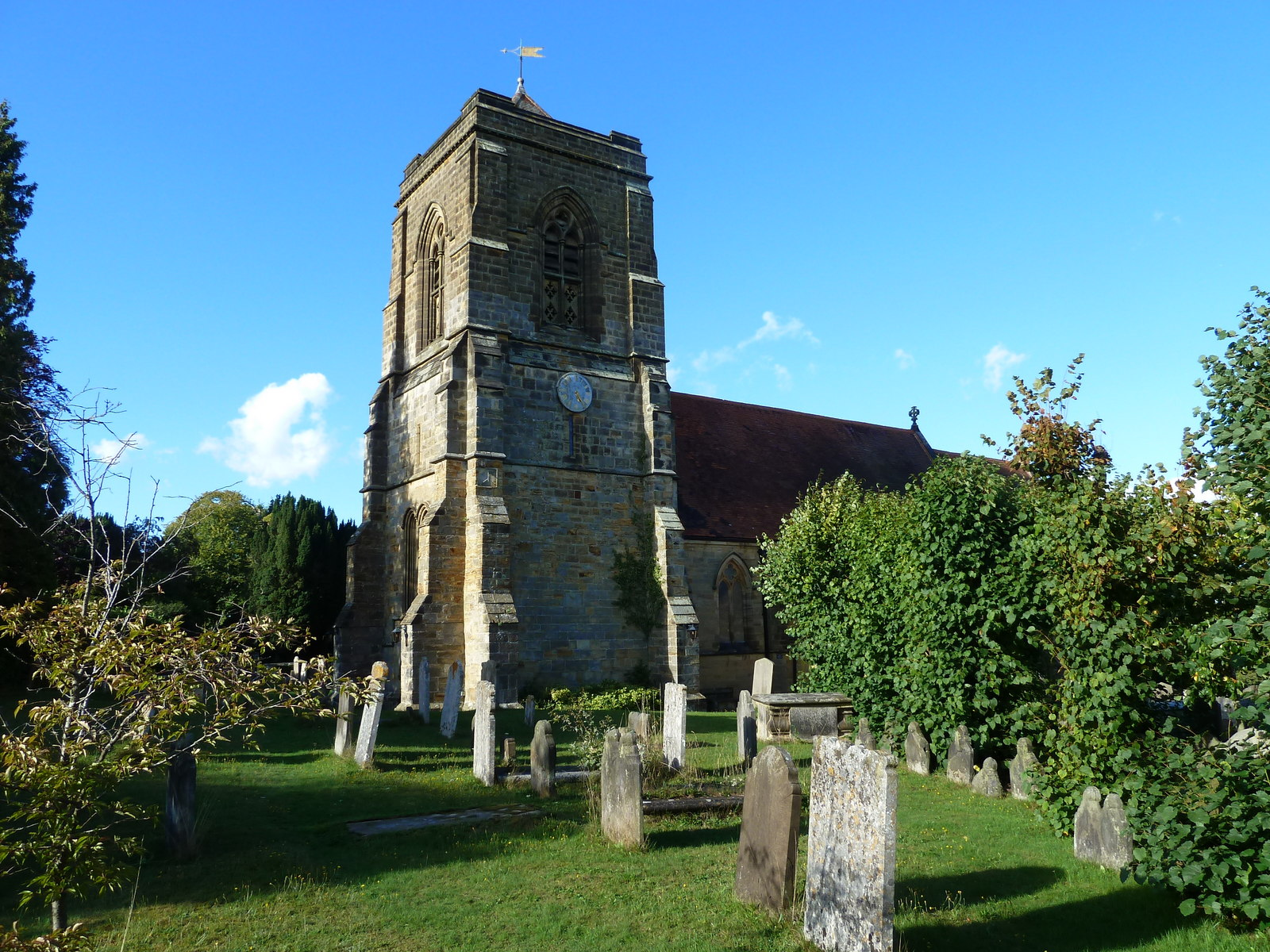
Pott lived in Speldhurst, Kent 1891-1909

Francis Pott was born in Southwark, London, the great-grandson of the surgeon Percivall Pott. His father was the proprietor of the family business, the Potts Vinegar factory (the site occupied today by the Sumner Buildings housing estate), and Francis grew up in a neighbouring house. The family firm was later taken over by Francis's brother, Robert Pott. He was also the brother-in-law of Constance Mary Fearon, Mrs Henry Pott (d. 1915) of South Kensington, who married his brother Henry, who was the father of the artist Constance Mary Pott (1862 - 1957), who was an assistant to Sir Frank Short at the Royal College of Art.

== Education ==
Pott studied classical languages at Brasenose College, Oxford when Edward Bouverie Pusey was an influential figure in the Oxford Movement, graduating with a Bachelor of Arts degree in 1854 and obtaining his Master's degree in 1857.

In 1856 he was ordained into the Anglican priesthood, initially serving as a curate in Bishopsworth, Gloucestershire (1856-8), before going on to serve in Ardingly, Berkshire from 1858 to 1861 and subsequently in Ticehurst, Sussex from 1861 to 1866. In 1866 he was appointed Rector of Northill in Bedfordshire. (In this context Northill is sometimes confused with the parish of Norhill in Cambridgeshire.)

In 1891, Pott was forced to resign from active work as a priest due to his increasing deafness. He went to live at the Birchetts, Speldhurst in Tunbridge Wells, Kent, where he continued in his hymn-writing work. Francis Pott died at Speldhurst on 26 October 1909. Owing to his involvement with the music and hymnody of the Anglican Church, Pott is frequently confused with his namesake and relative Francis Pott (b. 1957), the composer of the corpus of sacred choral and organ music sometimes misattributed to his ancestor.

== Works ==
"The Strife is O'er, the Battle Done"
Pott's Easter hymn set to Palestrina's tune Victory

As a scholar of classical languages, Pott was able to translate Latin and Syriac liturgical texts into English verse. One of his best-known hymns, "The Strife is O'er, the Battle Done", is a translation of a 17th-century Latin hymn, "Finita jam sunt proelia".

"The Strife is O'er" is often sung to the tune Victory, adapted from a 1591 setting of the Gloria by Giovanni Pierluigi da Palestrina from a Magnificat tertii toni. The additional Alleluia refrain was set to music by Monk. An alternative popular tune for this hymn is Vulpius, named after its composer Melchior Vulpius, who originally wrote it for the hymn "Gelobt sei Gott im höchsten Thron" in his 1609 Gesangbuch. "The Strife is O'er" first appeared with this setting, arranged by Henry George Ley, in the 1925 hymnal Songs of Praise.

Pott took an interest in the hymn tunes used to set his words to music; in particular, he expressed a dislike for the tune Angel Voices written by Arthur Sullivan for "Angel Voices, Ever Singing", which Pott considered a "trivial, pretty but altogether unfit tune". Pott subsequently made it a condition of publication of this hymn that it should not be set to Sullivan's tune. The hymn is more commonly sung to another tune of the same name by Edwin George Monk.

In 1861 he published a hymnal entitled Hymns fitted to the Order of Common Prayer, and Administration of the Sacraments, and other Rites and Ceremonies of the Church, According to the Use of the Church of England, To which are added Hymns for Certain Local Festivals, and in 1898 The Free Rhythm Psalter. He also served on the publishing committee of the original edition of Hymns Ancient and Modern (1861).

=== Authored hymns ===
- "Alleluia"
- "Angel Voices, Ever Singing"
- "Christ's foe becomes his soldier"
- "Hear, Holy Spirit, fount of sweetness"
- "O God of Bethel, by Whose hand"
- "Songs of Wesak hear us singing"
- "The Shepherd now was smitten"
- "The year is gone beyond recall"

=== Translated hymns ===
- "Ended His strife, the battle done" (Latin, anonymous, 1753)
- "In hunger, watch and prayer" (Latin, "Jesu quadragenaiae", Unknown author, pre-12th century)
- "The Strife is O'er, the Battle Done" (Latin, "Finita jam sun proelia", 17th century)

== See also ==
- List of Anglican church composers
