= The Strife is O'er, the Battle Done =

Christian hymn

- by Giovanni Pierluigi da Palestrina/Edwin George Monk/Melchior Vulpius
- Native name: Finita iam sunt proelia
- Genre: Hymn
- Occasion: Easter
- Text: 17th. C., transl. Francis Pott
- Language: English
- Based on: Mark 16:6
- Meter: 8.8.8 with alleluia
- Melody: Victory or Vulpius

"The Strife is O'er, the Battle Done" is a Christian hymn that is traditionally sung at Easter to celebrate the Resurrection of Jesus. It was originally a 17th-century Latin hymn, "Finita iam sunt proelia"; the popular English-language version is an 1861 translation by the English hymnwriter Francis Pott.

== Text ==
The text of the hymn extols the triumphant Christ whose victory over death and Hell is described as a battle, as related in the Harrowing of Hell. The hymn also makes reference to Christ breaking the chains of hell and to Christ in Majesty. Each verse concludes with an Alleluya! refrain.

The strife is o'er, the battle done;
Now is the Victor's triumph won;
O let the song of praise be sung.
Alleluya!

Death's mightiest powers have done their worst,
And Jesus hath his foes dispersed;
Let shouts of praise and joy outburst.
Alleluya!

On the third morn he rose again
Glorious in majesty to reign;
O let us swell the joyful strain.
Alleluya!

He brake the age-bound chains of hell;
The bars from heaven's high portals fell;
Let hymns of praise his triumph tell.
Alleluya!

Lord, by the stripes which wounded thee
From death's dread sting thy servants free,
That we may live, and sing to thee.
Alleluya!

== Tune ==
"The strife is o'er" has a metre of 8.8.8 with Alleluya, and is it commonly sung to one of two hymn tunes. The most common is the tune Victory, (Note: The transcription immediately below omits the initial and final repeated alleluyas.) adapted from a 1591 setting of the Gloria Patri by Giovanni Pierluigi da Palestrina from a Magnificat tertii toni. The additional Alleluya refrain was set to music by William Henry Monk.

An alternative popular tune for this hymn is Vulpius (transcribed in a typical setting below), named after its composer Melchior Vulpius, who originally wrote it for the hymn "Gelobt sei Gott im höchsten Thron" in his 1609 Gesangbuch. "The strife is o'er" first appeared with this setting with threefold Alleluyas, arranged by Henry George Ley, in the 1925 hymnal Songs of Praise.

== See also ==
- Anglican church music
