= Wingates =

Settlement in Greater Manchester, England

Coordinates: 53.559°N 2.523°W

- Location within Greater Manchester
- OS grid reference: SD654071
- Civil parish: Westhoughton
- Metropolitan borough: Bolton
- Metropolitan county: Greater Manchester
- Region: North West
- Country: England
- Sovereign state: United Kingdom
- Post town: BOLTON
- Postcode district: BL5
- Dialling code: 01942
- Police: Greater Manchester
- Fire: Greater Manchester
- Ambulance: North West
- UK Parliament: Bolton West

Wingates is a small settlement located in the town of Westhoughton, in the Metropolitan Borough of Bolton, Greater Manchester, England. The name is believed to mean 'a gate for the wind', and it seems likely as this is in an exposed position above Westhoughton. It has also been known as Win-yate and Windyates. Historically part of Lancashire, it lies mainly along the A6 road between Blackrod and Walkden.

== History ==
In 1315 a group of men led by Sir William Bradshaigh of Haigh Hall, Sir Henry Lea of Charnock Richard and Sir Adam Banastre met in the village to plan a campaign of violence against Sir Robert de Holland of Upholland, chief retainer of the powerful Earl of Lancaster. The campaign came to be known as the Banastre Rebellion and ended with the deaths of most of the main protagonists.

== Culture ==
Wingates is the home of the championship-winning Wingates Band, one of the best-known brass bands in the United Kingdom.

== Landmarks ==
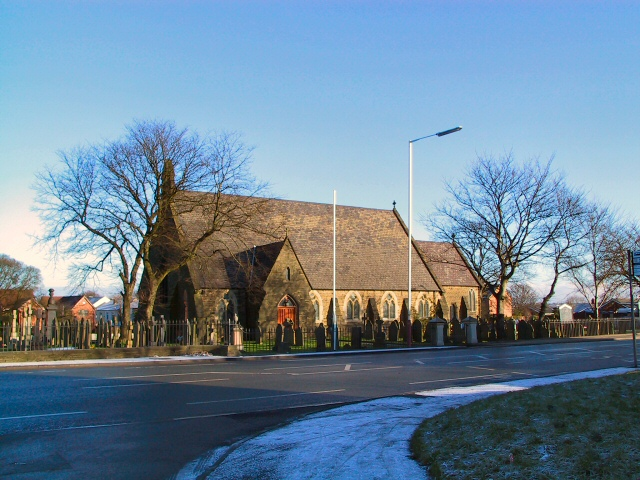
Church of St John the Evangelist, Wingates

John Wesley, the co-founder of the Methodist church, preached a sermon at Barnaby's Farm at Wingates in April 1784, an occasion commemorated by a memorial plaque on the side of the A6.

The Anglican Church of St John the Evangelist was consecrated in 1859. The vicar was Rev William Macrorie, the future Bishop of Maritzburg in the Colony of Natal (later South Africa). The well-known Christian hymn, "Angel Voices, Ever Singing", was written by the hymnwriter Francis Pott to commemorate the dedication of the new organ in 1861 at St John's. The churchyard contains many graves of the victims of the 1910 Pretoria Pit Disaster

From Wingates the A6 leads north-west to Blackrod and south-east to Walkden. From the church Wingates Lane leads to Lostock and Church Street to the centre of Westhoughton.
