= Frank Short =

British artist (1857–1945)

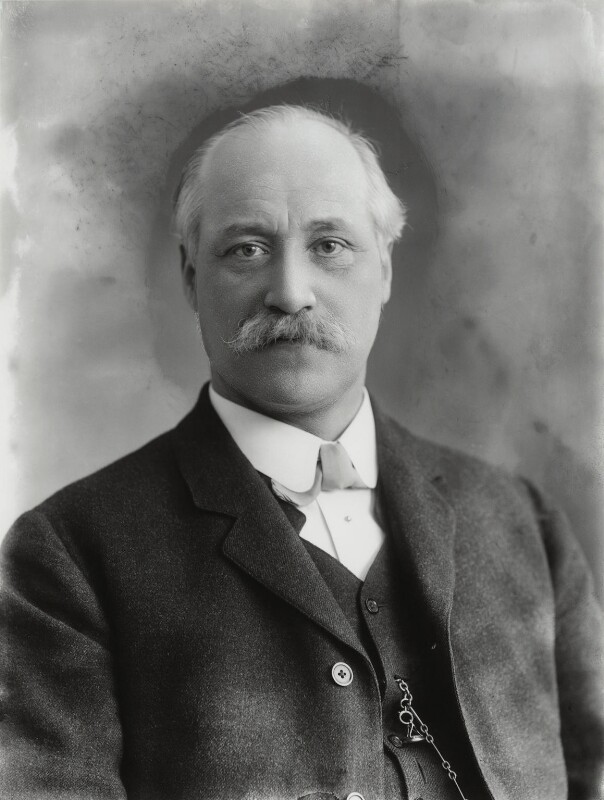
Short in 1914

Sir Francis Job Short RA PPRE (19 June 1857 – 22 April 1945) was a British printmaker and teacher of printmaking. He revived the practices of mezzotint and pure aquatint, while expanding the expressive power of line in drypoint, etching and engraving. Short also wrote about printmaking to educate a wider public and was President of the Royal Society of Painter Etcher & Engavers (now styled the Royal Society of Painter-Printmakers) from 1910 to 1938. He was a member of the Art Workers' Guild and was elected Master in 1901.

== Biography ==
Ebb Tide, Putney Bridge, mezzotint, 1885

Francis (Frank) Job Short was born on 19 June 1857, in Wollaston, a suburb of Stourbridge, Worcestershire. He was first educated to be a civil engineer.

Short was engaged on various works in the Midlands until 1881, when he came to London as assistant to Baldwin Latham in connection with the Parliamentary Inquiry into the pollution of the river Thames. In 1883 he was elected an associate member of the Institution of Civil Engineers. Having studied at the Stourbridge School of Art in his early years he joined the South Kensington School of Art (the first name of the current Royal College of Art) in 1883. Short also studied at the life class under Professor Fred Brown at the Westminster School of Art, and for a short time at the Schools of the Royal Institute of Painters in Water Colours.

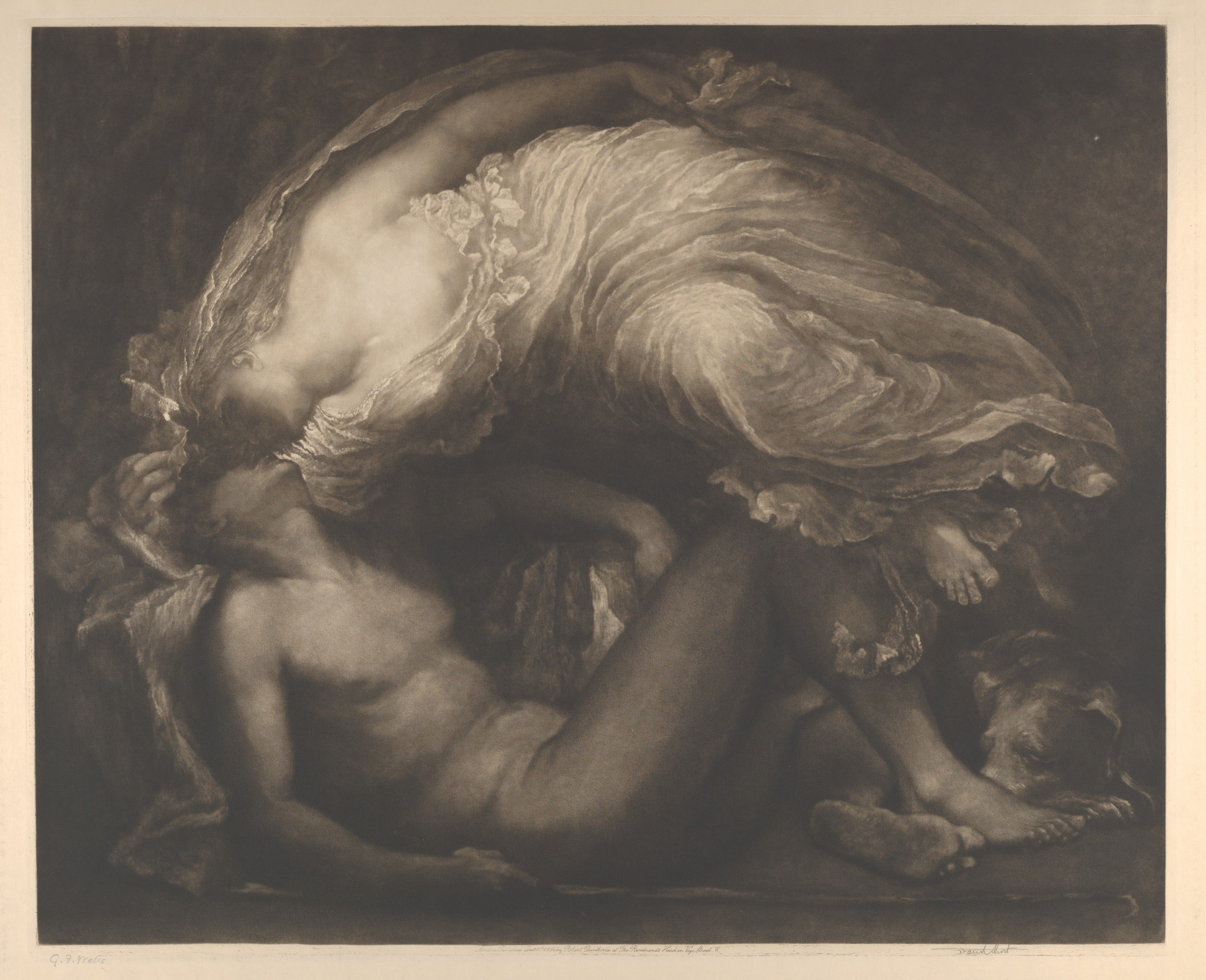
Diana and Endymion, etching and mezzotint, printed in brown ink, 1891, after George Frederic Watts

His real life-work now became that of an original and translator engraver. He was a keen student of the works of J. M. W. Turner; and his etchings and mezzotints from Turner's Liber Studiorum (1885 seq.), examples of painstaking devotion and skill, were among his earliest successes, combining sympathetic study of the originals with a full knowledge of the resources of engraving and unwearied patience. Short received praise, constant advice and encouragement from John Ruskin, and the co-operation of students of Turner such as William George Rawlinson and the Revd. Stopford Augustus Brooke. After completing the series from the existing plates of Turner's "Liber" Short turned to the subjects which Turner and his assistants had left incomplete. Several remarkable plates resulted from this study, bearing the simple lettering "F. Short, Sculp., after J. M. W. Turner, R.A.," which told little of the work expended on their production even before the copper was touched. He was consulted by Whistler for his expertise in printmaking and became friends.

Short also translated into mezzotints several pictures of George Frederic Watts, "Orpheus and Eurydice," "Diana and Endymion," "Love and Death," "Hope," and the portrait of Lord Tennyson, all remarkable as faithful and imaginative renderings. His own fine quality as a watercolour painter made him also a sympathetic engraver of the landscapes of David Cox and Peter De Wint.

A blue plaque marks Short's former home from 1898 to 1927 at 56 Brook Green, Brook Green, Hammersmith, London.

== Works ==
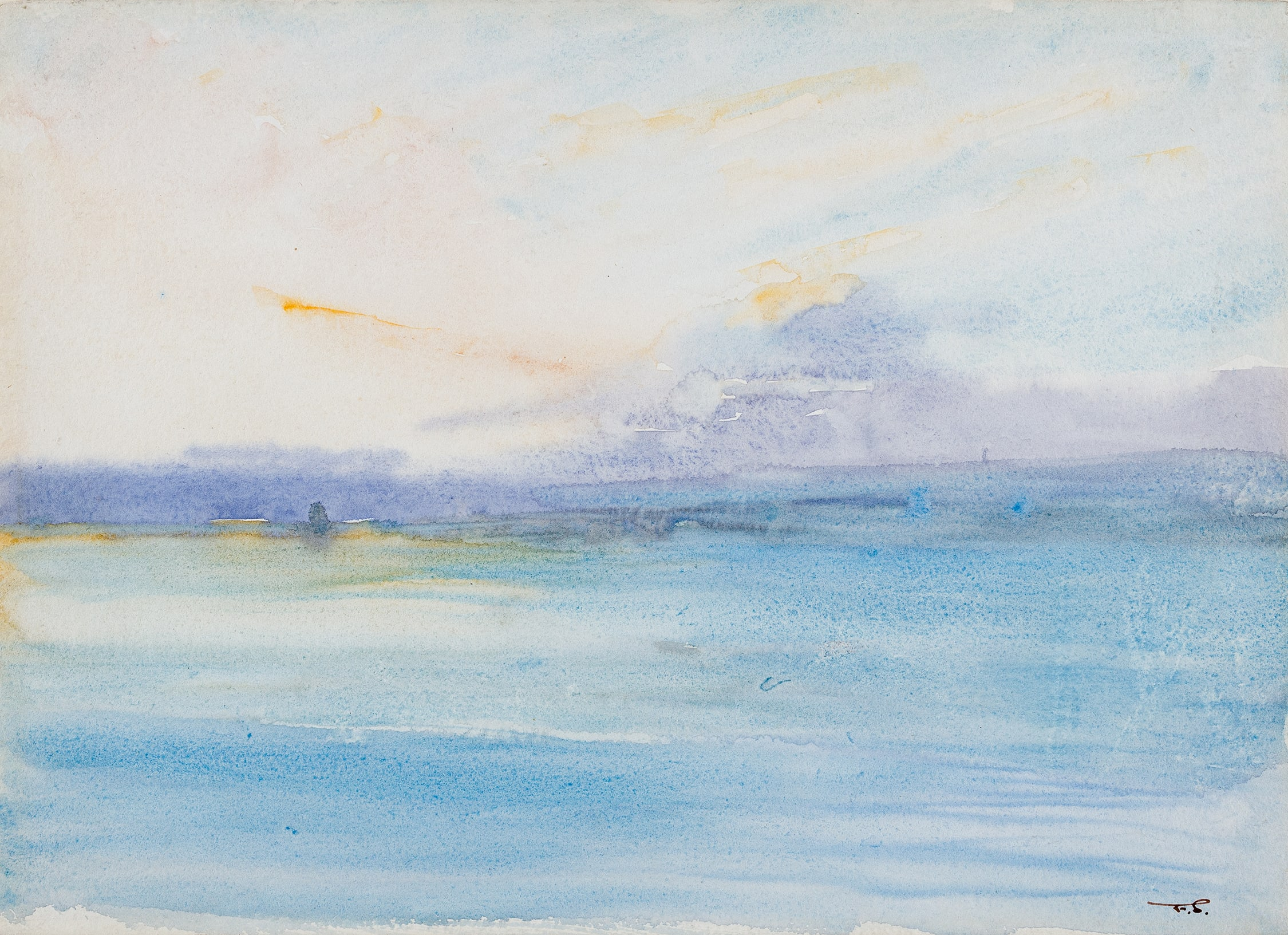
Watercolour study, Sea and sky at Seaford

Coastal landscapes, river estuaries, meadows and foreshores in Devon, Norfolk, Sussex, Cornwall and the north of England captivated him for his entire working life. Short's subtle and reticent drawing of the receding lines of the low banks and shallows of river estuaries and flat shores can be seen in many of his original etchings, mezzotints, and aquatints, notably "Low Tide and the Evening Star" and "The Solway at Mid-day." Other notable plates are:

- "Gathering the Flock on Maxwell Bank," a soft-ground etching
- "New moon over the Bure", aquatint
- "The Ferry over the Blyth," "Walberswick Pier," soft-ground
- "Dutch Greengrocery," "Noon on the Zuider Zee," "De-venter," "Strolling Players at Lydd," "The clay pit", and "Staithes," all etchings
- "A Wintry Blast on the Stourbridge Canal," "Peveril's Castle," and "Niagara Falls," dry points
- "The Curfew," "A Span of old Battersea Bridge," and "Sunrise on Whitby Scaur," aquatints
- "Moonrise, Ramsgate", "Orion over the Thames", "The Night Picket Boat at Hammersmith", "The Shadowed Valley", "Headlights over the Hill, Seaford", "The Angry Cloud, Seaford", "Exceat Farm and Hindover Hill, Alfriston near Seaford, Sussex", "Ebbtide, Putney Bridge," "The Weary Moon was in the Wane," "Solway Fishers," "The Lifting Cloud," and "A Slant of Light in Polperro Harbour," mezzotints.

As head of the Engraving School at the Royal College of Art, South Kensington from 1892 to 1920 and the inaugural Professor of Engraving from 1920 to 1924, Short had influence on younger painter-etchers and engravers, including Myra Kathleen Hughes RE, Percival Gaskell RE, Margaret Kemp-Welch RE, Martin Hardin RE, Job Nixon RE, Robert Austin RA, PPRE, Mary Annie Sloane, ARE, Malcolm Osborne RA, PPRE, Henry Rushbury RA, RE, Dorothy Woollard RE, Frederick Griggs RA, RE, Stanley Anderson RA, RE, Constance Mary Pott, and Eli Marsden Wilson ARE amongst many others.

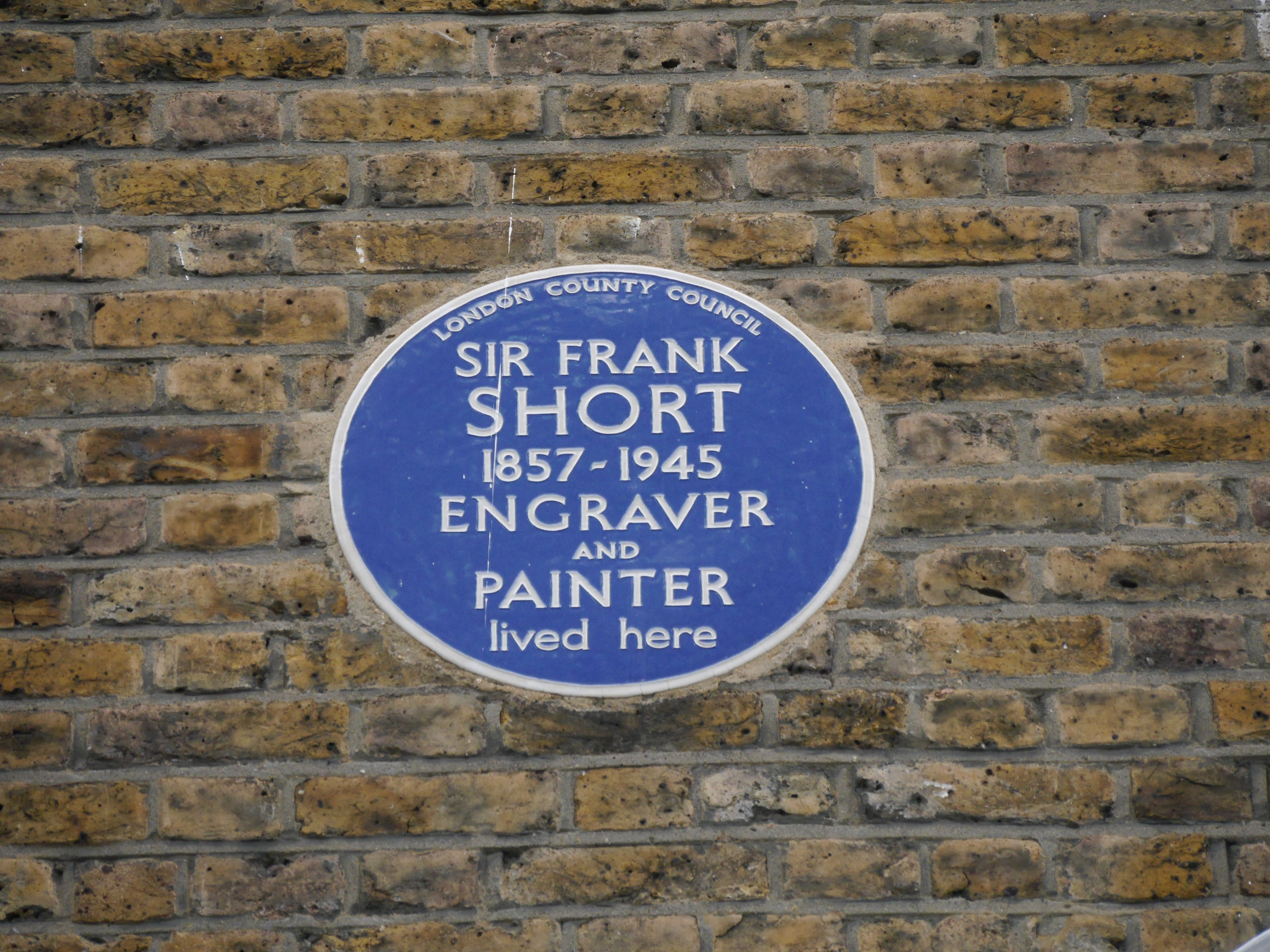
Blue plaque, 56 Brook Green

Short was elected a member of the Royal Society of Painter-Etchers and Engravers in 1885, and took a prominent part in conducting its affairs, becoming assessor (vice-president) in 1902. In 1910 he succeeded Sir Francis Seymour Haden as its second president for 28 years, steering the society through the First World War and the end of the etching revival of the 1920s and its crash from 1929.

Short received, amongst other distinctions, the gold medal for engraving at the Paris International Exhibition, 1889, and another gold medal for mezzotint (Rappel) 1900. In 1906 Short was elected an Associate of the Royal Academy, when membership as Associate Engraver was revived; and in 1911 he was elected a full Royal Academician, and also received a knighthood. His work as a watercolourist was recognised in 1917 when he was elected a member of the Royal Institute of Painters in Water Colours. Short was Treasurer of the Royal Academy from 1919 to 1932.

Short wrote several influential books on original printmaking: "On the Making of Etchings" was first published in 1888 and republished in 1911, 1912, 1951 and is still in print today. "British Mezzotints" from 1924 is a standard reference on original mezzotints.

The Etched and Engraved Work of Frank Short, a catalogue raisonne by Martin Hardie, in three volumes [I: Liber Studiorum; II: Mezzotints and Aquatints; III: Etchings and Lithographs] (Print Collector's Club, London, 1938–40) catalogues and describes 399 prints (many illustrated). Previously, a work with the same title by Edward F Strange (1908), describes 285 plates by the artist.

In October 2018 a new book about Short was published. Short's Sussex explores the works he did in Sussex in his later life, and includes 40 images.

Amongst many galleries and museums that hold examples of Frank Short's prints include:

- Metropolitan Museum of Art, New York City
- Victoria & Albert Museum
- British Museum
- Rye Art Gallery, Sussex
- National Gallery of Victoria, Melbourne, Australia
