= Constance Mary Pott =

English printmaker and teacher

- Born: 22 January 1862; West Wickham, Kent
- Died: 18 January 1957 (aged 94); London
- Education: National Art Training School
- Known for: etching and teaching
- Parents: Henry Pott (father); Constance Mary Pott, née Fearon (1833–1915) (mother)
- Relatives: Rev. Francis Pott (uncle)

Constance Mary Pott (22 January 1862 – 18 January 1957) RE, was a British printmaker during the late nineteenth century and the twentieth century. She became technical and teaching assistant to the printmaker Sir Frank Short at the Royal College of Art from 1902 until Short's retirement in 1924.

She was recognised as a pioneer in the etching revival, for her versatile mastery of technique and line, for the evocation of landscape in her plates, and for her professional occupation as a woman. Examples of her own works, principally etchings, are held in leading national collections, and appear in the salerooms.

She is sometimes confused with her mother, Constance Mary, Mrs Henry Pott (1833–1915), née Fearon.

== Biography ==
=== Origins ===
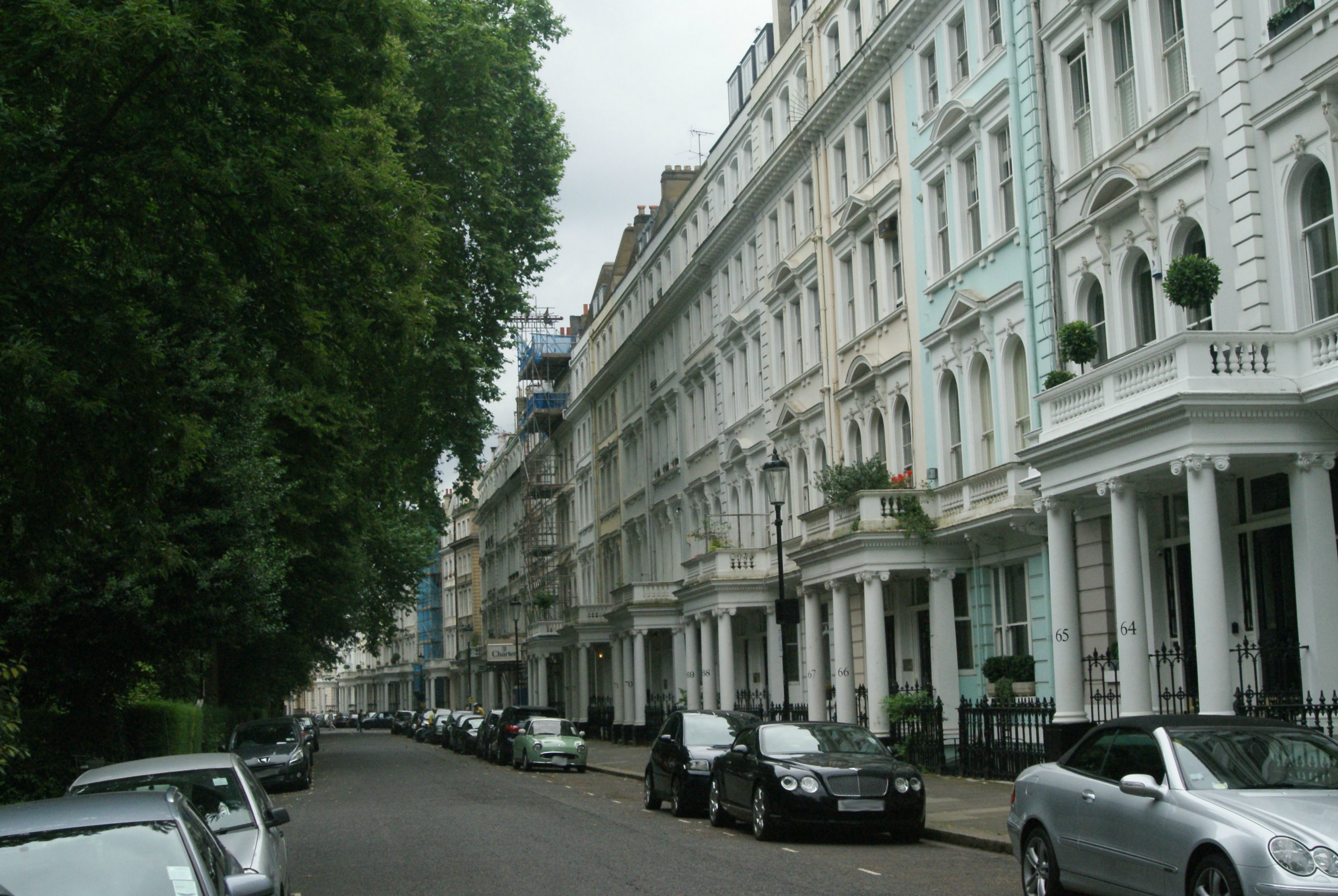
Cornwall Gardens. (Image: Robert Lamb)

Pott was born in West Wickham, Kent (now in the borough of Bromley), in 1862, the third of at least nine children of Henry Pott, stockbroker, and his wife Constance Mary (née Fearon). She grew up in a Victorian upper middle class family home in Cornwall Gardens, South Kensington, next-door to the architect Thomas Cundy III. Her father Henry Pott was a son of the proprietor of Pott's Vinegar Factory in Southwark.

Her mother, also Constance Mary, Mrs Henry Pott (1833 – 1915), who was a granddaughter of the eminent London property-developer James Burton, was an early advocate of the Baconian theory of Shakespeare authorship, and, in December 1885, founded the Francis Bacon Society. Constance Mary, Mrs Henry Pott, had published Bacon's manuscript collection of private notes as The Promus of Formularies and Elegancies (in which she found parallels to Shakespearean expressions) in 1883, and subsequently wrote several books about him, including Francis Bacon and his Secret Society (1891), which associated Bacon with the Rosicrucian movement, and Quite a Gentleman, which interpreted of esoteric paper marks of the Baconian period. Mrs Henry Pott was the subject of an admired mezzotint portrait by her daughter.

=== South Kensington ===
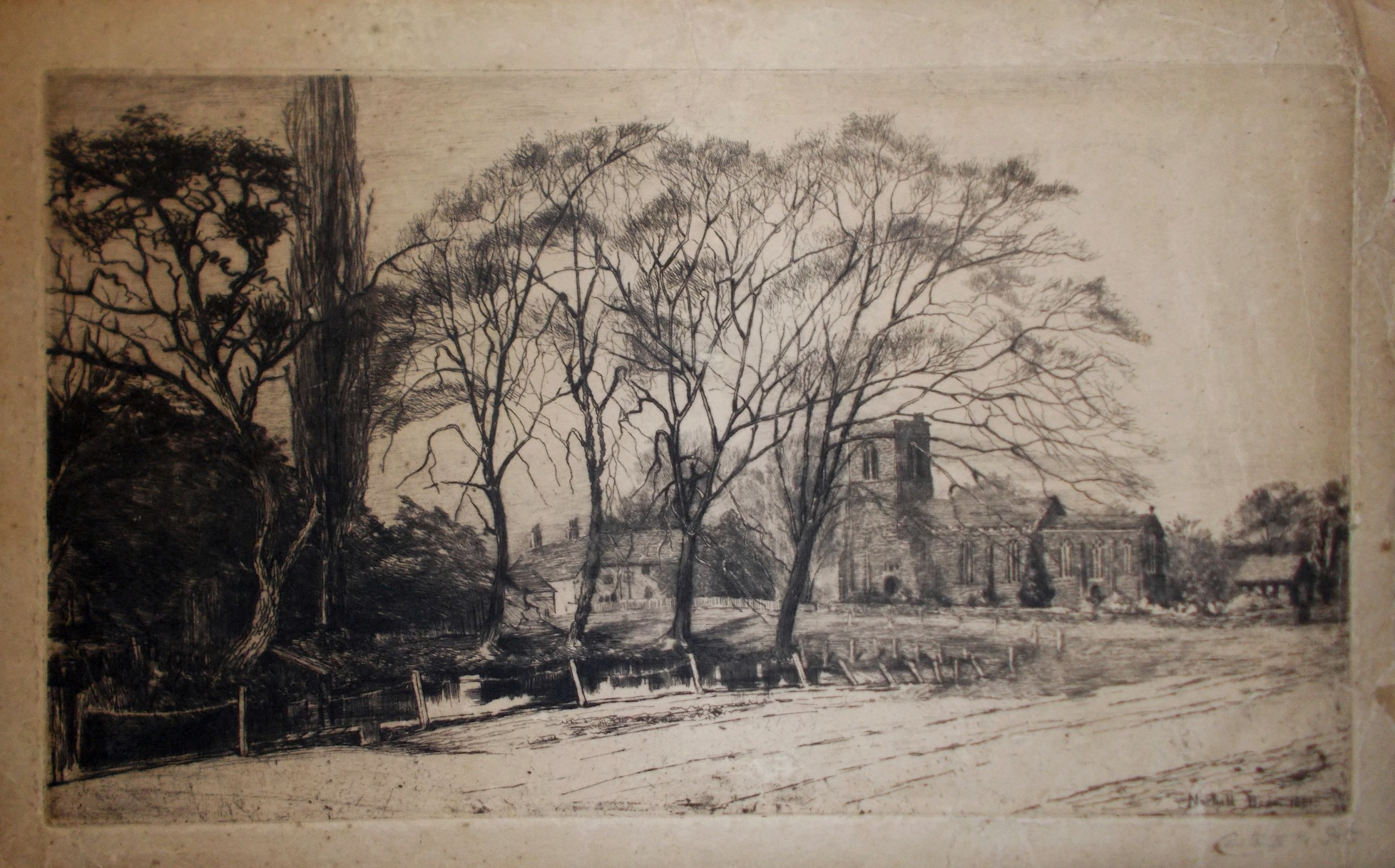
Northill, Bedfordshire, 1891. Etching by Constance Pott.

The South Kensington Museum evolved during the middle and later years of the nineteenth century, with collections in science and applied arts forming a resource for education and training in the rapidly expanding productive industries. Training schools for artists and craftsmen arose around the country under a syllabus moderated by the South Kensington system. The School of Design founded at Somerset House in 1837 was relocated to the Museum as the "National Art Training School". During the 1880s and 1890s the Art and Science collections were placed under separate directorships, leading eventually to the formation of the London Science Museum and the Victoria and Albert Museum as separate institutions.

The Art Training School was renamed the Royal College of Art in 1896, its emphasis increasingly upon the practice of art and design. In advance of this change, the School was attracting many students drawn more to fine art than to design. Constance Mary Pott attended the engraving class taught by the artist Sir Frank Short in 1891, laying the foundation of her artistic career, and of her professional association with Short. The national census of that year found her living at the Rectory of Northill, Bedfordshire, where her uncle, the hymn-writer the Revd. Francis Pott (1832-1909), an associate of the Bacon Society, had been rector since 1866. He was obliged to resign his benefice in 1891 owing to loss of hearing.

She became an Associate of the Royal Society of Painter-Printmakers in 1894 and a Fellow in 1898.

"In 1894 an etched plate called Southampton Water was sent to the annual exhibition of the British Royal Society of Painters and Etchers. It was not a large plate, but its blacks and whites were so exquisitely wrought, its lines so delicate and true, and at the same time the picture was so vivid that without delay the person who made the plate was elected a member of the etchers' society. The artist's name upon the plate was 'C.M. Pott'. A certificate of membership in the etchers' organization was sent to 'C.M. Pott, Esq.' Nobody knew C.M. Pott was a woman, but everybody in the British Art world knows it now. Even in 1894 there was so much prejudice against women that it is doubtful if the etchers would have admitted the artist among them if they had known her sex. She is a teacher at South Kensington and one of the world's most accomplished artists in the etching and engraving field."

In 1898, she met the Leicestershire artist Mary Annie Sloane (1867-1961, a student of Herkomer's), who became a close friend, and later was inspired to join Short's classes. Both ladies produced notable etchings of the Enderby weavers. Pott formally became Short's teaching assistant at the RCA in 1902 and was extolled as an excellent teacher by many critics and curators of the time. In connection with the exhibition of British engraving at the Victoria and Albert Museum of 1903-04, with Short she prepared the collection and the associated Museum catalogue of Tools and Materials used in Etching and Engraving.

She exhibited from 1893 to 1929. A notice of 1912 refers to her absolute command of every medium of the copperplate, her mastery of technique rendering service to a rare and beautiful artistic expression. The writer praised her "really splendid" plates for their individuality and vitality, and for her true selection of lines governed by her fine sense of design. She retired from her post in 1924, simultaneously with the retirement of Sir Frank Short as Director of the College. "...the inspiration of Sir Frank Short's teaching, with the loyal and invaluable collaboration of Miss Constance Pott, who leaves with him, must always remain a priceless asset to the School of Engraving."

A self-portrait etching of Pott in her studio in 1900 exists in a copy held at the Philadelphia Museum of Art. An oil on canvas portrait by James Robert Granville Exley (1878–1967) was sold at auction in 2020.

=== Personal life ===
Pott never married and died without issue, after she had outlived many of her contemporaries. She was an Honorary Vice-President of the Francis Bacon Society during the 1950s. In an obituary notice for the Society, it was written:

"The Francis Bacon Society and the great cause for which it stands have lost a champion. Such a role was not suggested by her diminutive figure and ageing years, and it would not have been apparent to those who did not know her. But, in the difficult years following the War and the controversies affecting the management of the Society, she ever strove to secure the maintenance of those cherished traditions which had stemmed from her mother, the founder; and, with staunch loyalty, stoutly resisted any attempt to depart therefrom. As a watchdog, she steadfastly safeguarded her mother's books and papers, thereby securing them against possible loss and destruction. My particular personal memory is of the readiness with which she extended a helping hand to a newcomer in search of the truth..."

She died in the last days of her 95th year, during 1957, in her family residence in Cornwall Gardens, South Kensington. She left the majority of her belongings to her two sisters and her money to Johannes Matthias Daum, who had been a student of hers at the Royal College of Art.

== Legacy ==
Constance Pott is one of several female artists from the period 1880 - 1930 who are considered in the book Etched in Memory: The Building and Survival of Artistic Reputation (2001).

The book's authors survey the etching revival, and discover why women artists found it more difficult than men to build and sustain their reputations. They find that Constance Mary Pott's failure to keep systematic records of her works has impeded acknowledgment of her influence, which she did not have any issue to continue, but that small interest in her work has continued.
