= Edwin George Monk =

English church organist

Edwin George Monk FRAS (13 December 1819 – 3 January 1900), English church organist and composer, who was Organist and Master of Choristers at York Minster for a quarter of a century, and was previously associated with St Columba's and Radley Colleges. He was born on 13 December 1819 at Frome, Somerset, and died on 3 January 1900 at Radley, near Abingdon, Oxfordshire.

== Early career ==
Monk studied in Bath and London under George MacFarren (theory), John Hullah and Henry Phillips (singing). He was appointed organist at St John's, Midsomer Norton and afterwards at Christ Church, Frome.

== Dublin and Radley ==
In going to Dublin in 1844, Monk commenced an association with William Sewell and Robert Singleton at the newly established (1843) High Church Anglican St Columba's College, Rathfarnham. It was an association which continued when the three men jointly were involved in founding St Peter's College, Radley, in Oxfordshire three years later. Monk's position at St Columba's was as organist, Precentor and Master of Music, and he was made a Fellow of the college.

Monk went to Oxford in 1847 and with Sewell and Singleton, helped in establishing the new college at Radley. In 1848 he became the first Fellow of St Peter's College, Radley, again, as at St Columba's, as Precentor. He features in entries in old boys' memoirs inter alia in connection with early games of cricket and football when there were insufficient boys to make up full teams. There is also an account of Monk having made a kite which was duly decorated with the school emblem and a device reading Sic itur ad astra.

Monk pursued an academic career at Oxford, graduating BMus in 1848 and being awarded a doctorate in 1856. At Oxford Monk also founded the University Motet and Madrigal Society. In addition to his musical career, he was an amateur astronomer (becoming a Fellow of the Royal Astronomical Society in 1871) and a Biblical scholar.

At Radley, Monk built up a firmly founded choral tradition and oversaw installation of Singleton's organ.

== York Minster ==
In 1859 E.G. Monk succeeded Thomas Simpson Camidge as organist at York Minster, and it was here that the long collaboration between himself and Singleton (who, after an interval living back in Ireland, had gone to York) resulted in the jointly edited collection The Anglican Hymn-Book – which contained nearly thirty original hymns. E.G. Monk was one of the first twenty-one members of the Royal College of Organists.

At York, Monk would oversee the rebuilding of both organs in the Minster.

== In retirement ==
Monk retired after nearly a quarter of a century of service at York Minster and returned to Radley, where he remained for the rest of his life, living in a house in the village. Following his death, he was interred alongside his wife, who predeceased him in 1883, in the Radley churchyard. No formal memorial commemorates him at Radley College, but the organ at St James's Church in the village was installed in his memory.

== Editor and composer ==
Monk is generally better known for his editorial work than for original compositions, the former including:

- The Psalter, with the canticles and hymns of the church pointed for chanting, and set to appropriate chants. 1850.
- The Anglican Chant Book. A collection of single chants, chiefly by composers of the sixteenth, seventeenth, and eighteenth centuries edited by Edwin George Monk (1850)
- The Anglican choral service book: being the order for chanting the daily prayer, litany, and holy communion, &c. Novello, Ewer and Co. 1858.
- Words of the Anglican Hymn Book. Edited by ... R. C. Singleton ... and E. G. Monk. London: J.H. & J. Parker. 1868.
- The Anglican Hymn Book. Novello, Ewer. 1871.
- Chants for the Daily Psalms: As Used in York Minster. J. Sampson. 1869.

Of his compositional output, says Philip Scowcroft, Monk "nevertheless begat church music and cantatas conscientiously." It has been noted that his most significant work was with Anglican psalms, and several of his own chants are still in regular use. Especially well known amongst some forty hymn tunes is Monk's Angel Voices, composed in 1861 for Francis Pott's hymn of that name, written for the opening of an organ in Wingates Church, Lancashire. Another of his tunes is Hopkins, associated with the hymn When from the East the wise men came.

In addition Monk composed a number of choral concert works, and five anthems, as well as the librettos for three oratorios.

| Preceded by Thomas Simpson Camidge | Organist and Director of Music, York Minster; 1859 – 1883 | Succeeded by John Naylor |
