= Sebastopol Bell, Windsor =

Bell rung for deaths of British monarchs

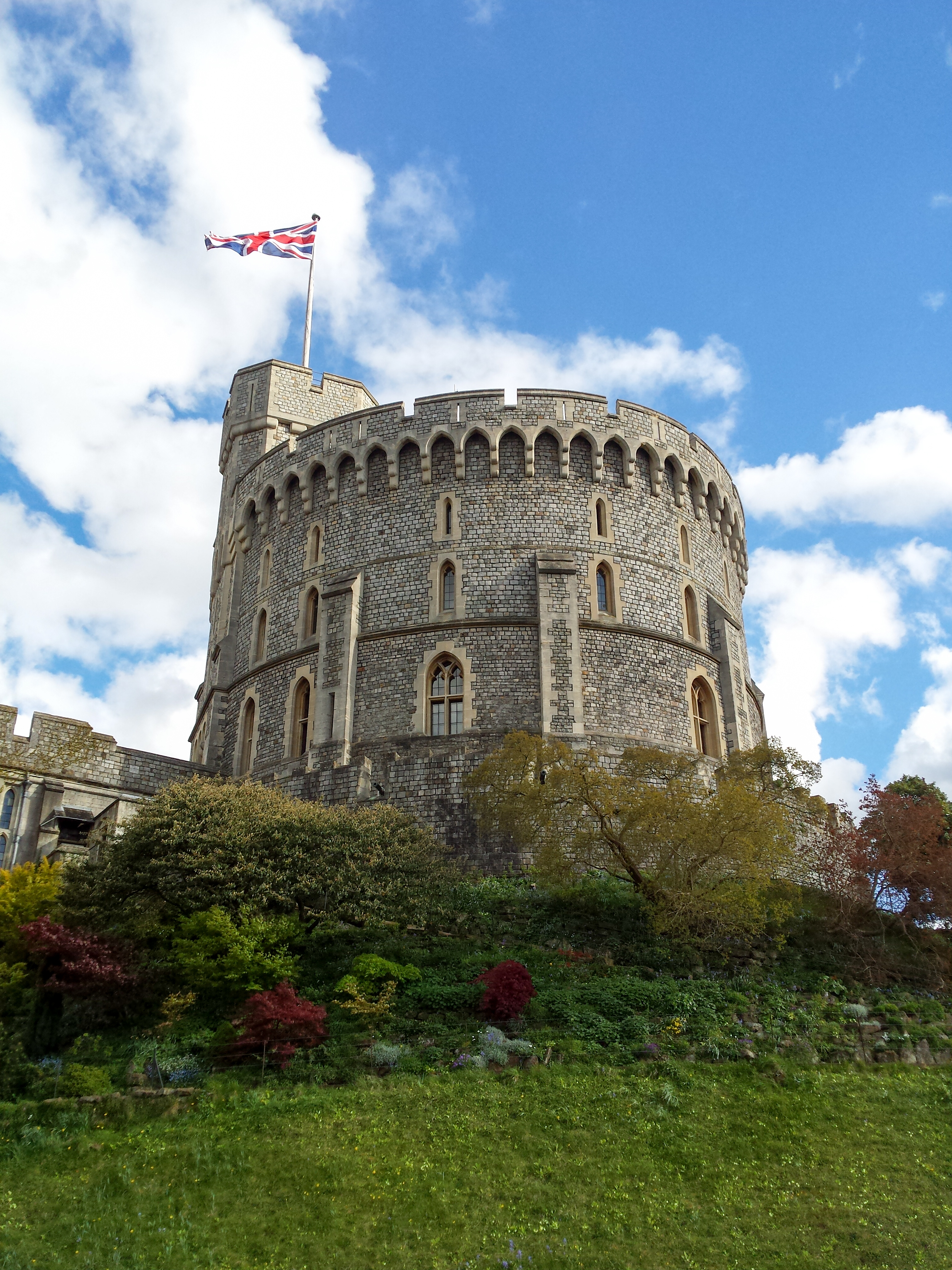
The Round Tower at Windsor Castle

The Sebastopol Bell in Windsor is one of two large bells captured at the Siege of Sebastopol in 1855 at the close of the Crimean War. It is hung in the Round Tower of Windsor Castle and is only rung on the death of the most senior members of the royal family.

== Origin ==
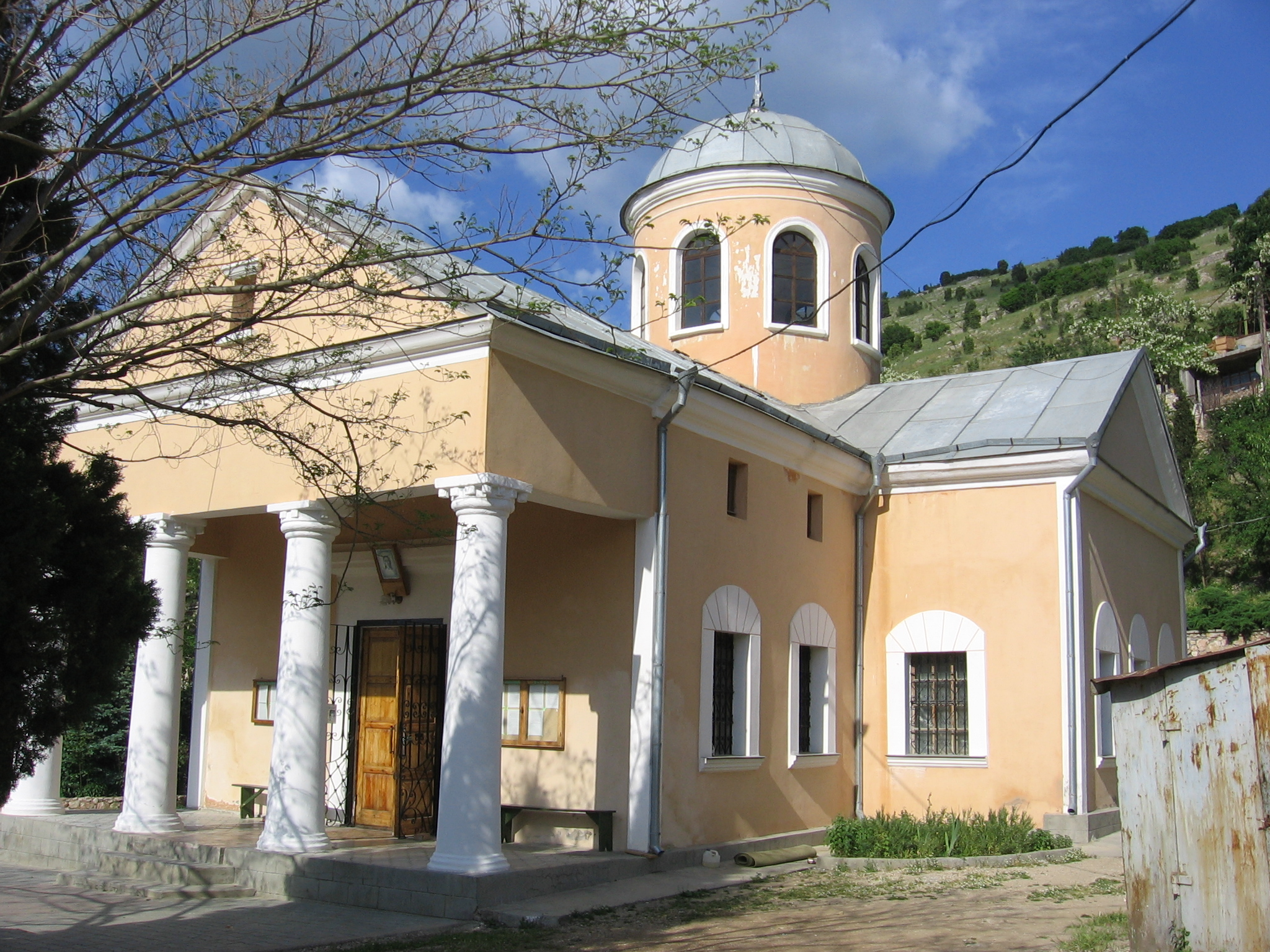
The Church of the Twelve Apostles at Balaklava, a port settlement close to Sevastopol.

The Sebastopol Bell is one of a pair of bells, appropriated by the British Army as war trophies from the Church of the Twelve Apostles in Balaklava. This church is a 14th century foundation rebuilt in 1794, which served as the garrison church of the Greek Battalion of Balaklava.

On 19 February 1856 Queen Victoria viewed captured war trophies from the Siege of Sevastopol at the Royal Arsenal, Woolwich. Victoria decided that one of the captured bells be sent to Windsor Castle. It was presented to Victoria in late December 1868 at Windsor Castle and initially placed on the castle's North Terrace alongside a large gun captured during the siege, but was later hung in the Round Tower above the steps in the centre of the tower. The other bell was taken to Aldershot Garrison where it has been displayed in various locations and is currently housed in an open-sided wooden shelter outside the St Omer Barracks.

== Description ==
The bell was cast by Nicholas Samtoun of Moscow at an unknown date. It weighs 17 cwt and 30 lbs (877.25 kg), and has relief decoration, including elaborate bands and motifs of crowns and angels. The bell is inscribed "Sevastopol-Nicolas Sanctus" and with the record of its weight in poods. The Times described its tone as "rich and sonorous" in 1868.

== Usage ==
The bell was rung following the death of Edward VII in 1910, 101 times for the state funeral of George V on 27 January 1936, 56 times at the announcement of the death of George VI on 7 February 1952, and at the funeral of Queen Elizabeth The Queen Mother in 2002. It was rung 96 times to mark the 96 years of Elizabeth II's life on 9 September 2022 following her death the previous day, and on 19 September, the day of her state funeral, tolled throughout the procession along the Long Walk to St George's Chapel.
