= Karl Ludwig Gerok =

German organist, composer and organ teacher

- Born: 27 January 1906; Oberfischach
- Died: 28 June 1975 (aged 69); Murrhardt
- Occupations: Classical organist; Professor
- Organizations: Stiftskirche, Stuttgart; Musikhochschule Stuttgart

Karl Ludwig Wilhelm Gerok (27 January 1906 – 28 June 1975) was a German organist, composer and organ teacher.

== Career ==
Karl Ludwig Gerok was born in Oberfischach, the grandson of Karl von Gerok, a Stuttgart prelate and preacher (Oberhofprediger) at the Schlosskirche, the court church of the Stuttgart palace, and the author of Palmblätter. Karl Ludwig Gerok studied organ at the Musikhochschule Stuttgart under organist Arnold Strebel and then with Karl Straube in Leipzig.

From 1930, Gerok was cathedral organist in Halberstadt. He worked from 1946 as an organ teacher at the School of Church Music (Kirchenmusikschule) in Esslingen am Neckar and later at the Musikhochschule Stuttgart where he taught Künstlerisches und liturgisches Orgelspiel (Concert and church organ playing). Among his students were composer Edgar Rabsch (de) (1928–1990) as well as Helmuth Rilling. He was the author of the standard work Lehrgang der Orgelimprovisation (Course of organ improvisation, 1976).

From 1948, Gerok was organist at Markuskirche (Stuttgart) and from 1958 to 1969 served as organist of the collegiate church Stiftskirche, Stuttgart. During this time he was also a significant contributor and editor of the collection Württembergisches Choralbuch, which includes 15 chorale preludes on hymns such as "Aus tiefer Not schrei ich zu dir", "Herzliebster Jesu" and "Gelobt sei Gott im höchsten Thron". Prelude on "Christ ist erstanden" (1933) and "O Traurigkeit, o Herzeleid" (1940) appeared in Neue Choralvorspiele zu den Liedern des Evangelischen Kirchengesangbuchs (New chorale preludes to songs of the Protestant hymnal) in Tübingen in 1976.

Gerok died in Murrhardt where he is buried on the Walterichsfriedhof.

== Literature ==
- Volker Lutz: Erinnerungen an Karl Gerok. In: Württembergische Blätter für Kirchenmusik, 2006, Nr. 1. (in German)
- Karl Ludwig Gerok, Organist an der Stiftskirche Stuttgart, Lebensstationen. In: Programmheft der Petruskirche zum 100. Geburtstag (in German)
