= Karl Gerok =

German preacher and religious poet

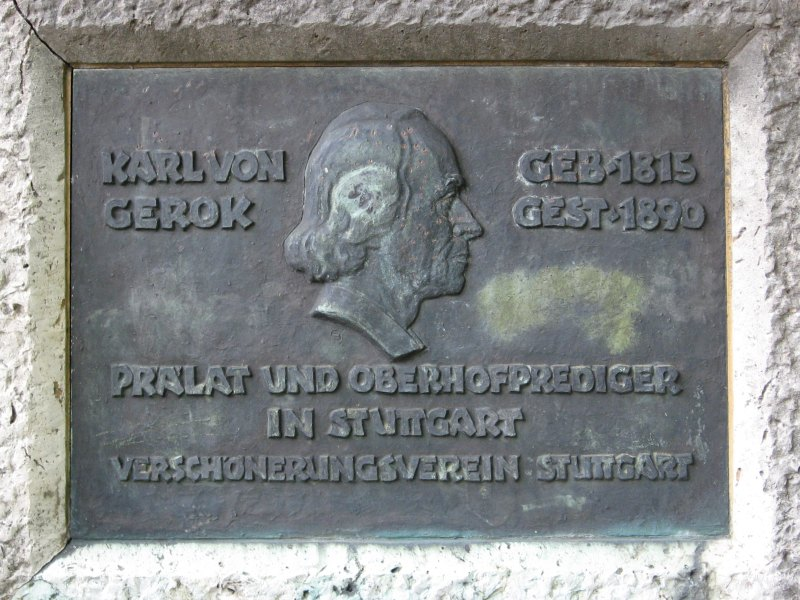
- Memorial plaque at gravesite

Karl Gerok (January 30, 1815 Vaihingen - January 14, 1890 Stuttgart) was a German preacher and religious poet.

== Biography ==
He studied at Tübingen, and became chief court preacher and chief consistorial councillor in Stuttgart in 1868.

== Works ==
His sermons, and particularly his religious poetry, were much admired. The chief collection of the latter is entitled Palmblätter (“Palm leaves,” 1857; 17th ed., 1871). It was translated into English by Brown (London, 1869). This and Pfingstrosen (“Pentecost roses,” 4th ed., 1870) made him famous. He also published Blumen und Sternen (“Flowers and stars,” 3rd ed., 1870) and, during the Franco-Prussian War of 1870-71, patriotic effusions under the title of Deutsche Ostern (“German Easter”).
