= Kerensa Briggs =

British composer

Kerensa Rosie Joanne Briggs (born 1991) is a British composer, primarily of choral and organ music. In 2022 she began a three-year term as composer-in-residence with the Saint Louis Chamber Chorus in Missouri, USA.

== Family and education ==
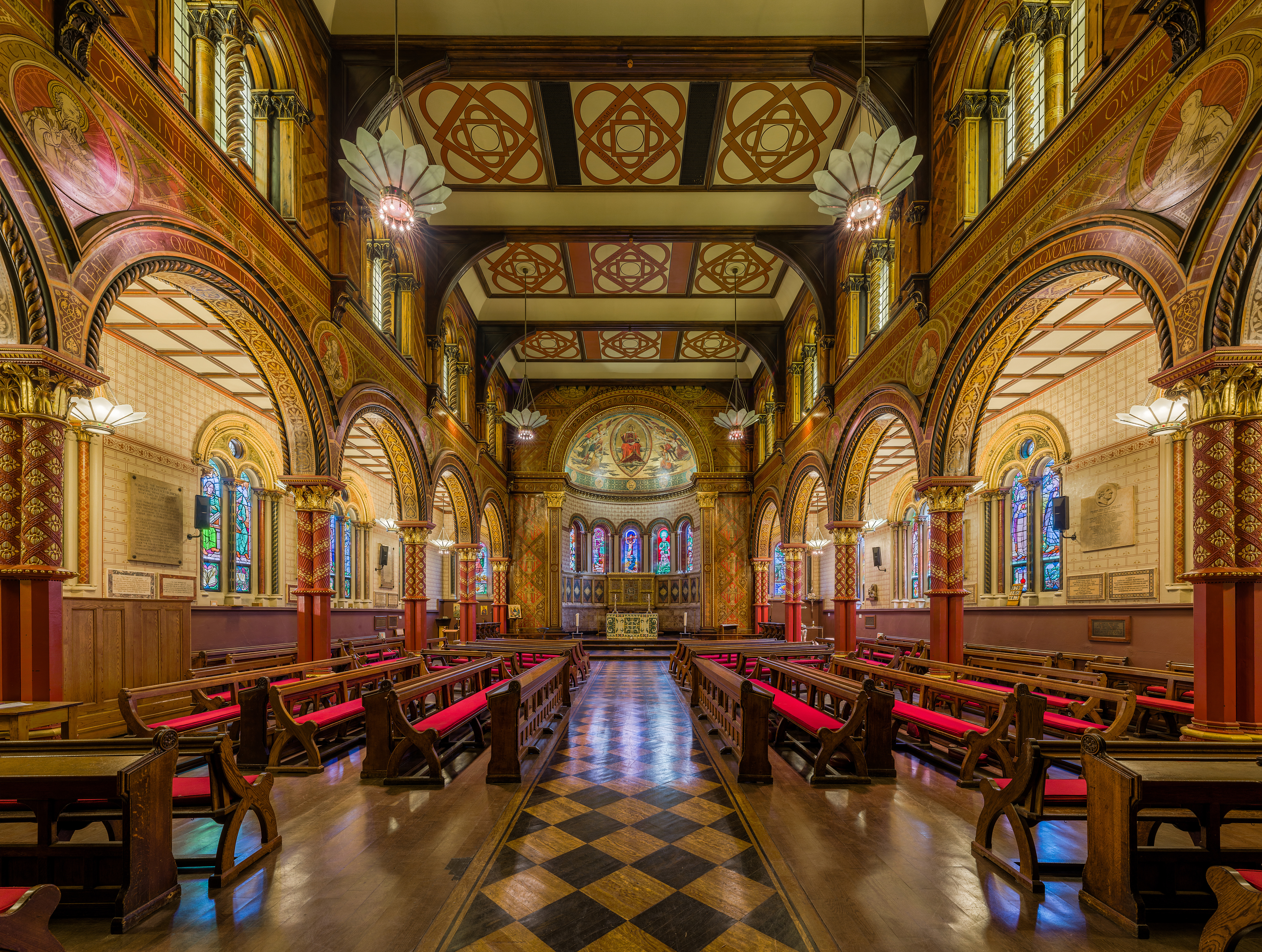
The chapel of King's College London, where Briggs studied; the college choir has since performed several of Briggs's works.

Briggs was born in Truro, Cornwall, in 1991, while her father, David, was organist and master of the choristers at Truro Cathedral.

After her father moved to Gloucester Cathedral, she sang in the youth choir there. She attended The King's School in Gloucester from 1995 to 2002 and later studied music at the University of Bristol. Afterwards she sang with the Choir of King's College London, where she held a choral scholarship and was awarded a Master of Music degree in composition.

== Career ==
Briggs plays the piano and harp and began composing as a child. In 2014 she was the joint winner of the National Centre for Early Music Young Composers Award, for her composition Lamentations of Jeremiah.

She became composer-in-residence at Godolphin and Latymer School. In 2022 she began a three-year term as composer-in-residence with the Saint Louis Chamber Chorus in the USA.

Briggs's music, which is inspired by the Anglican choral tradition, Gregorian chant, early music and jazz, has been performed at St Paul's Cathedral and the Sistine Chapel and has been broadcast on BBC Radio and Classic FM by ensembles such as the Tallis Scholars and the BBC Singers. Recordings have also been released by the English choral group Voces8 and by the choir of Pembroke College, Cambridge, under the direction of Anna Lapwood. Briggs has been described as writing in a "generally tonal and audience-friendly idiom, not to mention a singer/performer-friendly idiom". Her choral works have been described by The New York Times as "poignant, ambivalent, quietly devastating music" and by BBC Music Magazine as "alluring and heartfelt", and have been performed at the London Festival of Contemporary Church Music each year since 2018.

Briggs's Requiem was performed by the BBC Singers under the direction of David Hill, with Stephen Farr at the organ, during the BBC Radio 3 Afternoon Concert series in November 2023 to mark Remembrance Day, and the world premiere of her setting of the O antiphon O Clavis David was sung by the choir of Norwich Cathedral during the BBC Radio 3 broadcast of Choral Evensong the following month.

== Selected works ==
Briggs's works include the following:

=== Choral works ===
- Lamentations of Jeremiah
- A Tender Shoot
- Media Vita (inspired by the work of the same name by John Sheppard)
- Exodus III
- Gloucester Service
- Windsor Service
- Preces and Responses
- Eternal Father
- Old Mother Earth
- Requiem
- Festival of Psalms (composed with David Briggs)
- Height in Depth Suite
- O Clavis David
- Ode to a Saviour
- Seeking You
- Missa Brevis
- Severn Meadows
- Ubi Caritas
- Coventry Carol
- Messe Solennelle
- Lead, Kindly Light

=== Organ works ===
- Light in Darkness
- Prelude on Pange Lingua

=== Other works ===
- Forget (for piano trio or orchestra)
- Cello Sonata
- Apricity (for string quartet and percussion)

== Discography ==
- Requiem (Delphian Records, 2023), with the Choir of King's College London
