= Secular Requiem =

- by Russell Pascoe
- Album Cover for The Secular Requiem, released by Regent Records (UK)
- Commissioned by: Three Spires Singers
- Text: Poems by John Donne, Wilfred Owen, Rabindranath Tagore, Thomas Hardy, Robert Louis Stevenson, Dylan Thomas, Kakinomoto no Hitomaro, Thomas Moore, Stephen Anderton, Anthony Pinching, Walt Whitman
- Language: English
- Composed: 2011–2012
- Performed: 23 March 2013
- Published: 2013
- Movements: 14 in 5 sections
- Scoring: Contralto, baritone, and mixed choir with either orchestra OR organ and percussion

Russell Pascoe (composer)
- Other name: Ylyer Hellys (see Gorsedh Kernow)
- Education: University of Bristol; University of Reading
- Occupations: Composer, Choir Director
- Era: Contemporary

The Secular Requiem is a large-scale work by the British composer Russell Pascoe with text assembled by Anthony Pinching. It comprises fourteen sections within five movements and exists in two orchestrations; the first for orchestra, choir, and contralto and baritone soloists, the second for organ and percussion accompaniment.

Departing from the liturgical requiem form, Pascoe's work combines non-religious texts from the likes of John Donne, Dylan Thomas, Kakinomoto no Hitomaro, Walt Whitman, Rabindranath Tagore, and Thomas Hardy.

In 2022, the requiem was released under Regent Records (UK), recorded with soloists Catherine Wyn-Rogers and Julien Van Mellaerts, Truro Cathedral Choir, the BBC National Orchestra of Wales, and conducted by Christopher Gray. The album peaked at number 5 in the UK's Official Specialist Classical Albums Chart.

== History ==
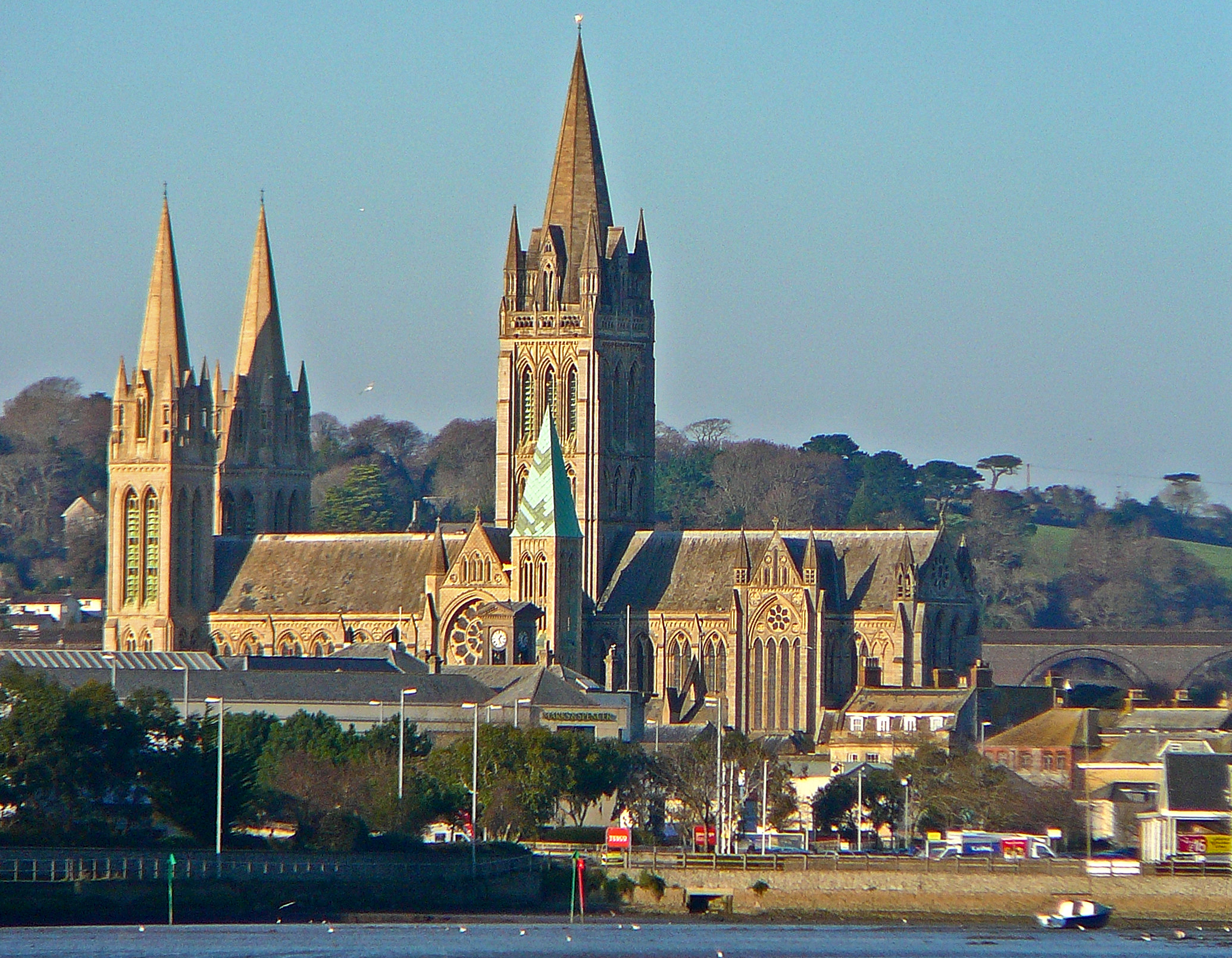
Truro Cathedral, where the Secular Requiem was premiered in 2013

The work is one of a number of requiems which move away from the traditional Latin requiem mass. Such a movement has been described as a post-Enlightenment phenomenon which really took hold during the nineteenth century. Following Brahms's Ein Deutsches Requiem, the first performance of which took place in the secular setting of the Leipzig Gewandhaus, Hubert Parry and others began utilising a hybrid of religious and non-religious elements in their work. Composers such as Herbert Howells, Paul Hindemith, John Foulds, and Benjamin Britten further experimented in this sense, by developing the Requiem through the 20th century (see Requiem Modern Treatments).

The "Secular Requiem" follows this tradition. Commissioned by Truro Cathedral's Three Spires Singers and composed by a "carefully considered non-believer", Pascoe intended the piece to be inclusive and accessible to those with or without a faith. This ambition led him to set historic and contemporary poetry from around the world.

Christopher Gray – then the Director of Music at Truro Cathedral – compared the Secular Requiem to Britten's War Requiem in respect to its unfolding, large-scale planning, and use of non-Latin poetry (only partial in Britten's work).

The Secular Requiem premiered in 2013 in Truro Cathedral with soloists Catherine Wyn-Rogers and Stephen Roberts.

== Structure, Scoring, and Text ==
The composition is structured into five sections:

1. The Proposition
2. The Recognition
3. The Reaction
4. The Transition
5. The Accommodation

The piece has a duration of roughly 50 minutes.

The text was selected by Anthony Pinching – professor of immunology known for his work on HIV/AIDS and ME. Pinching's text is structured to reflect the popular notion of the 5 stages of grief.

There are two editions – both are scored for SATB choir and contralto and baritone soloists, but one accompanied by a full orchestra and the other by organ and percussion.

=== I. The Proposition ===
Duration = 8 minutes

Like the requiems of Fauré and Mozart, the Secular Requiem opens slowly and in D minor. Words from John Donne’s "No Man is an Island" are set for the choir.

The key changes to F sharp minor and a baritone soloist sings Wilfred Owen’s "I Saw His Round Mouth’s Crimson".

The Proposition ends in A major, with the first line of "Peace My Heart", by Rabindranath Tagore, sung by unaccompanied upper voices. This same short setting is returned to at the conclusion of each of the first three sections:

Peace, my heart, let the time for the parting be sweet.

— Rabindranath Tagore

=== II. The Recognition ===
Duration = 7 minutes

The second section of the Secular Requiem opens with a more anxious feel, with solo Contralto and Baritone singing words from Thomas Hardy’s "The Going". This is followed by text from Requiem by Robert Louis Stevenson's "Requiem", scored in E major for SATB. The choir sings unaccompanied at first, with the orchestra gradually entering as the piece goes on.

The Recognition section ends, again, with a short setting of Rabindranath Tagore's "Peace My Heart".

=== III. The Reaction ===
Duration = 12 minutes

Set with heavy chromaticism, the third section of Pascoe's requiem opens with Dylan Thomas’s “Do not go gentle into that good night”. It is scored for SATB with solo baritone and full orchestra or organ and is one of the longer elements of the work. Jeremy Dibble has described this as an “unsettling, stormy scherzo”.

A poem by Kakinomoto no Hitomaro follows. Translated into English, "When she was still alive" is sung by a Contralto soloist and a wordless choir.

Tagore’s "Peace My Heart" is then revisited, sung again by upper voices without accompaniment.

=== IV. The Transition ===
Duration = 12 minutes

"The Last Rose of Summer", by Thomas Moore opens the fourth section of the Secular Requiem, scored for a Baritone soloist in G minor with Tenors and Basses. The smooth, melodic tone of "The Last Rose of Summer", is then contrasted with a more humorous setting, for contralto, of "Cats and Cakes" by Stephen Anderton.

Pascoe's full setting of "Peace my Heart" by Tagore rounds off this section. While already touched upon throughout the requiem, here both contralto and baritone soloists join with the a cappella choir.

=== V. The Accommodation ===
Duration = 11 minutes

The fifth, and final, section of the requiem completes the reflection upon the cycle of life with a positive note. It opens with words from Walt Whitman’s "Come lovely and soothing death", sung by the choir after an extended orchestral introduction. At its climax, the main musical themes of the requiem are heard together.

The requiem concludes with one of Anthony Pinching's own poems, "Seasons", written especially for this collaboration and sung by contralto and baritone soloists with the full choir. Of this, reviewer John Quinn remarked, “As I listened, it seemed to me that the words and music of this conclusion carried a firm message that sorrow is past and beyond it there is hope.”

== Recordings ==
Secular Requiem

Studio album by Russell Pascoe
- Released: 2022
- Recorded: 2022
- Genre: Classical
- Length: 1:11:31 (Complete album); 49:13 (Secular Requiem alone)
- Label: Regent Records (UK)
- Producer: Gary Cole

Professional ratings
Review scores
Source	Rating
AllMusic	4/5 stars

The first full recording of the Secular Requiem was undertaken by the BBC National Orchestra of Wales and Truro Cathedral Choir with soloists Catherine Wyn-Rogers and Julien Van Mellaerts. This was released by Regent Records (UK) in 2022 along with recordings of Pascoe's "Threnody for Jowan" and "A Sequence for Remembrance".

The "Threnody" was written in response to the death of the new-born child of a close friend of Pascoe's. It is an unaccompanied choral piece which has been described as 'beguiling' and 'touching' by reviewers who have praised the 2022 recording as particularly 'beautifully rendered'. "Threnody for Jowan" was described by Malcolm Riley of Gramophone Magazine as 'the perfect foil' to the "Sequence for Remembrance" - a larger-scale piece commissioned by Truro Cathedral to commemorate the centenary of the end of World War I and dedicated to the memory of Joe Manley.

The album peaked at number 5 in the UK's Official Specialist Classical Albums Chart.

== Awards and honours ==
Roundly praised by critics, particularly on release of the 2022 album, Andrew Palmer wrote that the Secular Requiem "is worth exploring not just because of the marvellous pairing of music and texts but as an inspiring and beautiful work, full of hope.". Jean-Yves Duperron, in his review, states that "Russell Pascoe sets down the proper emotive tone for each differing poem, which at times projects a diametric atmosphere, but manages to weave everything together into one cohesive and well-proportioned whole."

The 2022 recording of the Secular Requiem was chosen as one of Gramophone Magazine’s Editors’ choices for January 2023, praising "the best new classical recordings" for the first issue of the new year.
