= James Anderson-Besant =

English Chorister

- Born: 1998 (age 27–28); England
- Occupations: Organist and Master of the Choristers

James Anderson-Besant (born 1998) is a British organist and choir director who has served as Organist and Master of the Choristers at Truro Cathedral in Cornwall, England, since 2023.

== Early life and education ==
Anderson-Besant grew up in Oxfordshire and sang in the church choir at St Helen's in Benson. He later became the church's organist after learning the organ at Abingdon School, where he was awarded a music scholarship. After a gap year as an organ scholar at Gloucester Cathedral, he studied at St John's College, Cambridge, where he was also the organ scholar and assistant organist for four years, under Andrew Nethsingha. During that time he was heard on live BBC Radio broadcasts and on CD recordings. Studying under Stephen Farr, he won the Northern Ireland International Organ Competition in 2019 and graduated from St John's the following year with a double starred first in music.

== Career ==
From 2021 Anderson-Besant was assistant director of music at Exeter Cathedral for two years before being appointed Organist and Master of the Choristers at Truro Cathedral in 2023. A month after taking up the role, he directed the cathedral choir during a visit to St Ives by King Charles III and Queen Camilla.

He also conducts the Cornish choral group the Three Spires Singers.

== See also ==
- List of Old Abingdonians

Preceded by Timothy Parsons	Assistant Organist, Exeter Cathedral; 2021−2023	Succeeded by Michael Stephens-Jones
Preceded by Christopher Gray	Organist and Master of the Choristers, Truro Cathedral; 2023−present	Succeeded by
