= Tom Griffiths (rugby union) =

English rugby union player

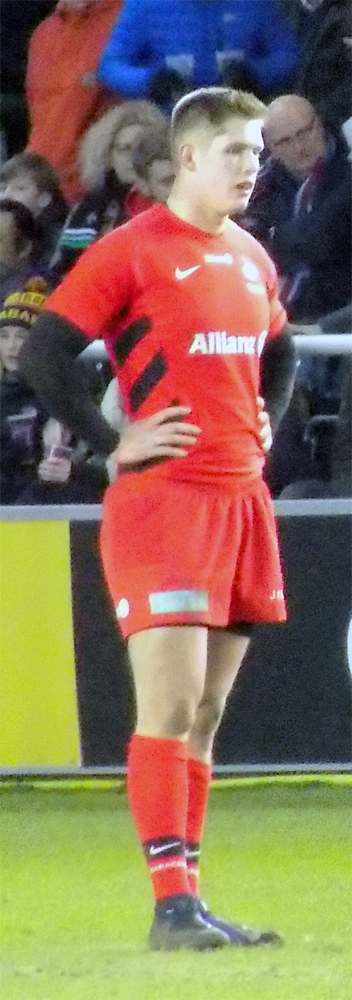
- Born: Thomas Griffiths; 17 November 1995 (age 30) Gloucester, England
- Height: 1.88 m (6 ft 2 in)
- Weight: 98 kg (15 st 6 lb)
- School: Churchdown School

Rugby union career
- Position: Centre
Amateur team(s)
Years	Team	Apps	(Points)
2013–2014	Hartpury RFC		
- Correct as of 27 December 2017
Senior career
Years	Team	Apps	(Points)
2015–2019	Saracens	3	(10)
2015–2017	→Bedford Blues	17	(30)
2018	→London Scottish	5	(15)
2019-	Dragons	1	(0)
2021–2022	→ Coventry	0	(0)
- Correct as of 21 October 2019
International career
Years	Team	Apps	(Points)
2013	England U18s		
2014	England U20s		
- Correct as of 27 December 2017

Tom Griffiths (born 15 November 1995) is an English rugby union player who represents Welsh side Dragons, in the Pro14.

Originally from Gloucester, Griffiths was part of Hartpury RFC in winning their fourth AASE title back in April 2013. It led to call ups to both England U18s and to England U20s where he competed in the 2014 Six Nations Under 20s Championship.

He became part of Saracens academy squad back in 2015 where he was dual-registered to Bedford Blues in the RFU Championship for both the 2015–16 and 2016–17 season.

On 1 February 2017, Griffiths signed his first professional contract with Saracens, thus promoted to the senior squad from the 2017–18 season.

Having been released by Saracens at the end of the 2018–2019 season, Griffith signs for Welsh region Dragons in the Pro14 from the 2019–20 season.

On 14 July 2021, Griffiths would sign for RFU Championship side Coventry on a season-long loan for the 2021–22 season.
