= Peter Dyke =

English organist (born 1965)

Peter Dyke (born 11 March 1965) is an English organist. A Fellow of the Royal College of Organists, he has recorded several albums either as a soloist or accompanist, including three for Regent Records and one for Priory Records.

== Career ==
Dyke was organ scholar of Robinson College, Cambridge and was awarded Fellowship of the Royal College of Organists in 1987. He then became the organist of St Helen's Church, Wheathampstead. Dyke remained at St Helen's until 1992, at which point he moved to St Woolos' Cathedral, Newport, serving there as assistant organist. While at Newport, Dyke entered the interpretation competition at the 1993 St Albans International Organ Festival, co-winning second place.

From 1995 to 1998, Dyke held the organ scholarship at St Albans Cathedral, after which he moved to Hereford Cathedral. He now serves at Hereford as its assistant director of music. In addition to his regular duties there, Dyke accompanies the cathedral choir during its various broadcasts and tours, as well as at the annual Three Choirs Festival. The cathedral's Voluntary Choir was founded by him in 2000.

Dyke produced a series of "audio diaries" that were broadcast by BBC Radio 3 in 2005. Called Bach Walks, the series showed him following (by car) the 260-mile route J.S. Bach walked from Arnstadt to Lübeck to meet Dietrich Buxtehude.

Dyke's carol Three Kings was published by Encore in 2014.

== Discography ==
Year	Title	Role	Choir	Record label	Catalog No.
1993	Dvořák: Mass in D Major / Elgar: Te Deum and Benedictus	Accompanist	Dyfed Choir	Alpha	CDCA 954
1996	J.S. Bach: Organ Mass	Soloist	n/a	Lammas	LAMM 092D
1997	Praise and Majesty	Accompanist	St. Alban's Cathedral Choir	Lammas	LAMM 095D
2005	Sounds Idyllic	Soloist	n/a	Lammas	LAMM 148D
2005	William Byrd: Anthems, Motets & Services	Accompanist	Hereford Cathedral Choir	Griffin	GCCD 4048
2009	Howells from Hereford	Accompanist	Hereford Cathedral Choir	Regent	REGCD316
2010	Great European Organs No. 80: The Organ of Hereford Cathedral	Soloist	n/a	Priory	PRCD1029
2012	Christmas from Hereford	Accompanist	Hereford Cathedral Choir	Regent	REGCD388
2016	Easter Day at Hereford	Accompanist	Hereford Cathedral Choir	Regent	REGCD478

Dyke provides accompaniment for three of the 20 tracks on the 1997 Lammas recording.
