= George Guest =

Welsh organist and conductor (1924–2002)

George Guest CBE FRCO
- Born: February 9, 1924; Bangor, Wales
- Died: November 20, 2002 (aged 78)
- Genres: Choral, liturgical
- Occupation: Choral conductor
- Instrument: Organ
- Years active: 1940–1991
- Formerly of: Choir of St John's College, Cambridge

George Guest CBE FRCO (9 February 1924 – 20 November 2002) was a Welsh organist and choral conductor.

== Birth and early life ==
George Guest was born in Bangor, Gwynedd. His father was an organist and Guest assisted him by acting as organ blower. He became a chorister at Bangor Cathedral and subsequently at Chester Cathedral, where he took organ lessons from the sub-organist, Dr Roland Middleton. He passed the examinations for ARCO in 1940 and FRCO in 1942. By this time he had become the organist and choirmaster of Connah's Quay parish church, Flintshire.

Being proud of his Welsh roots, from the 1970s onwards Guest took a personal interest in the Cambridge University Welsh Society (Cymdeithas Y Mabinogi), sponsoring many of its events and providing a welcome face for Welsh students away from home.

At the age of 18 Guest was called up for military service, and joined the Royal Air Force, being posted to India in 1945. On leaving the services in 1947 he took up the post of sub-organist at Chester Cathedral. The cathedral organist, Malcolm Boyle, encouraged him to apply for the organ scholarship at St John's College, Cambridge, for which he was successful.

At Cambridge Guest studied under Robin Orr, who had served as organist and choirmaster at St John's College since 1938. In Guest's final year as organ scholar, Robin Orr announced that he intended to leave, and (with Orr’s encouragement) the College Council offered the post to Guest, who took over the position in 1951.

== Organist and Choirmaster at St John's College ==
Within five years of Guest becoming organist and choirmaster, the whole future of the choir at St John's College came into question, with the proposed closure of the day school which provided the choristers. Guest, with the support of his predecessor, persuaded the College to fund a Choir School.

Under Guest's direction, the choir built up a formidable reputation, challenging the supremacy of the choir of King's College, Cambridge. Guest introduced a more "continental" tone into the choir, as George Malcolm was doing at Westminster Cathedral.

The choir began broadcasting on the BBC in the early 1950s and started making recordings in 1958. By the time of Guest's retirement in 1991, the choir had recorded sixty LPs or CDs under his direction.

For many years from 1972 the BBC broadcast Evensong from St John's College every Ash Wednesday, and the Advent Carol Service each year since 1981. During George Guest's tenure, the choir undertook many overseas tours.

In 1987 Guest was appointed Commander of the Order of the British Empire (CBE) in the Queen's Birthday Honours.

Herbert Howells and Michael Tippett are among the many composers who wrote liturgical settings for the St John's College choir whilst Guest was organist and choirmaster. They also include the French composer Jean Langlais, who wrote a setting of the psalm Beatus vir for the choir: a rare occurrence of a continental composer writing for the English cathedral tradition.

Organ Scholars who studied under George Guest include:

- Sir David Lumsden (Southwell Minster, New College, Oxford, Principal of the Royal Academy of Music, London)
- Brian Runnett (organist, Norwich Cathedral)
- Jonathan Bielby (organist, Wakefield Cathedral)
- Jonathan Rennert (St Michael's, Cornhill)
- David Hill (organist, Winchester Cathedral; organist and choirmaster, St John's College, Cambridge; Chief Conductor, BBC Singers; Musical Director, The Bach Choir)
- Robert Huw Morgan (University Organist, Stanford Memorial Church)
- Adrian Lucas (organist, Worcester Cathedral)
- Andrew Lumsden (Southwark Cathedral, Westminster Abbey, Lichfield Cathedral, Winchester Cathedral)
- Sir Stephen Cleobury (King's College, Cambridge)
- John Scott (St Paul's Cathedral, London, and subsequently St Thomas Fifth Avenue, New York City)
- Andrew Nethsingha (Truro Cathedral; Gloucester Cathedral; Organist and Director of Music, St John's College, Cambridge, and subsequently Westminster Abbey)

Preceded by Robin Orr	Director of Music, St John's College, Cambridge; 1951–1991	Succeeded by Christopher Robinson

== Miscellaneous ==
George Guest was a guest on Desert Island Discs in 1976 (https://www.bbc.co.uk/sounds/play/p009n0jz). He was a lifelong supporter of Chester City FC. The famous British baritone Simon Keenlyside was a chorister and subsequently a choral scholar in the choir of St John's College, Cambridge while George Guest was the choirmaster there. Actor Clive Mantle was another chorister at St. John's.
