= Luke Bond =

British organist (born 1980)

- Education: Churchdown School; King's School, Gloucester; Bristol University
- Occupation: Classical organist
- Organizations: Truro Cathedral; St George's Chapel, Windsor Castle

Luke Bond (born 2 February 1980) is a British organist and is currently Assistant Organist at St George's Chapel, Windsor Castle, where he played prominently for the wedding of Prince Harry and Meghan Markle in 2018, the funeral of Prince Philip, Duke of Edinburgh in 2021 and the committal service of Queen Elizabeth in 2022. He has appeared internationally, and has made recordings of organ music and choral music.

== Career ==
Bond was "mad about the organ" from the age of three, when he played his grandmother's instruments. He attended Churchdown School followed by King's School in Gloucester where organists for Gloucester Cathedral were educated for many centuries. He got serious about becoming an organist only when he received a scholarship to a cathedral school, and learned for a year with Andrew Nethsingha. He studied at Bristol University.

Bond was organist at Clifton College, then at the Collegiate Church of St Mary, Warwick, and served for eight years as Assistant Director of Music at Truro Cathedral. In Truro, he gained national recognition appearing in a recording of music by Benjamin Britten in 2013, the composer's centenary year, with the Truro Cathedral Choir conducted by Christopher Gray. They recorded both choral and organ solo compositions. The same year, he made his first organ solo recording, entitled Mighty Voice, combining works by Mendelssohn, Charles-Marie Widor and William Walton with music by contemporary composers. In 2014, he took part in a recording Vox Clara with music by Gabriel Jackson, with the Cathedral Choir conducted by Gray. Several works were especially written for the choir, and some recorded for the first time.

In April 2017, Bond took over as organist and assistant director of music at St George's Chapel, Windsor Castle. Besides accompanying or conducting the Chapel Choir in eight choral services each week, he has played for highly visible functions such as the 2018 wedding of Prince Harry and Meghan Markle and the funeral of Prince Philip, Duke of Edinburgh in 2021. For the funeral service, he had to play several pieces both before and after the service, as well as accompanying the choir during the service.

In 2018, Bond was the organist of a recording titled Christmas at St. George's Windsor, with the Chapel Choir conducted by music director James Vivian, recorded at St Matthew's Church, Northampton, and including music also for Advent and Epiphany. A reviewer described him as "a model of accompanimental sensitivity". In 2019, Bond was resident organist of the Milton Abbey International Music Festival of Voces8 vocal ensemble. He performed works by J. S. Bach on the Abbey organ, before a concert of Bach's St John Passion on 31 July 2019. On 21 November 2019, Bond appeared as the soloist for Poulenc's Organ Concerto with the Cape Town Philharmonic Orchestra conducted by Bernhard Gueller.
