= John Dykes Bower =

English cathedral organist (1905–1981)

Bower in 1958.

Sir John Dykes Bower CVO (13 August 1905 – 29 May 1981) was an English cathedral organist who served in Truro Cathedral, Durham Cathedral and St Paul's Cathedral.

== Background ==
Bower was born in Gloucester into a musical family, a descendant of the hymn writer John Bacchus Dykes. He was one of four brothers, including Stephen Dykes Bower, who became a famous church architect.

He was educated at Cheltenham College and studied organ under Sir Herbert Brewer. He was an organ scholar at Corpus Christi College, Cambridge, where he was awarded the John Stewart Rannoch scholarship in sacred music.

== Church musician ==
Bower was the organist and choirmaster at St Paul's Cathedral for more than 30 years, from 1936 to his retirement in 1968. Following his death in 1981, he was eulogised as "an austere perfectionist with a strong feeling for the big occasion." Major services he played included the Thanksgiving service after the Second World War and at the state funeral for Sir Winston Churchill.

He was also a sub-conductor at the coronations of both King George VI and Queen Elizabeth II. In 1953, he toured North America with the St Paul's choir and conducted a concert at the White House before President Dwight D. Eisenhower.

From 1936 to 1969, Bower also served as organ professor at the Royal College of Music and was associate director of the Royal School of Church Music.

Together with G. H. Knight, he co-edited the "revised edition" of Hymns Ancient and Modern, which was published in 1950.

- Hymn tune 'Lanteglos' to the hymn 'Lord that descendest, Holy Child' (Hymns Ancient & Modern New Standard #398)

== Career ==
He was organist of:

- Truro Cathedral, 1926–1929
- New College, Oxford, 1929–1933
- Durham Cathedral, 1933–1936
- St Paul's Cathedral, 1936–1968

Cultural offices
Preceded by Hubert Stanley Middleton	Organist and Master of the Choristers of Truro Cathedral; 1926-1929	Succeeded by Guillaume Ormond
Preceded by William Henry Harris	Organist and Master of the Choristers of New College, Oxford; 1929-1933	Succeeded by Sydney Watson
Preceded by Arnold D. Culley	Organist and Master of the Choristers of Durham Cathedral; 1933-1936	Succeeded by Conrad William Eden
Preceded by Stanley Marchant	Organist and Master of the Choristers of St Paul's Cathedral; 1936-1968	Succeeded by Christopher Hugh Dearnley
