= David Briggs (English musician) =

English organist and composer (born 1962)

David John Briggs (born 1 November 1962) is an English organist and composer.

He started his career as a cathedral organist as Assistant Organist at Hereford Cathedral before becoming the organist of Truro and Gloucester Cathedrals. Heavily influenced by Jean Langlais and Pierre Cochereau, Briggs is regarded as one of the world's finest improvisors, and now works as a concert organist. He is also a composer of choral and organ music and has transcribed many orchestral works for solo organ, as well as many of Cochereau's recorded improvisations. His daughter is the composer Kerensa Briggs.

== Early life and training ==
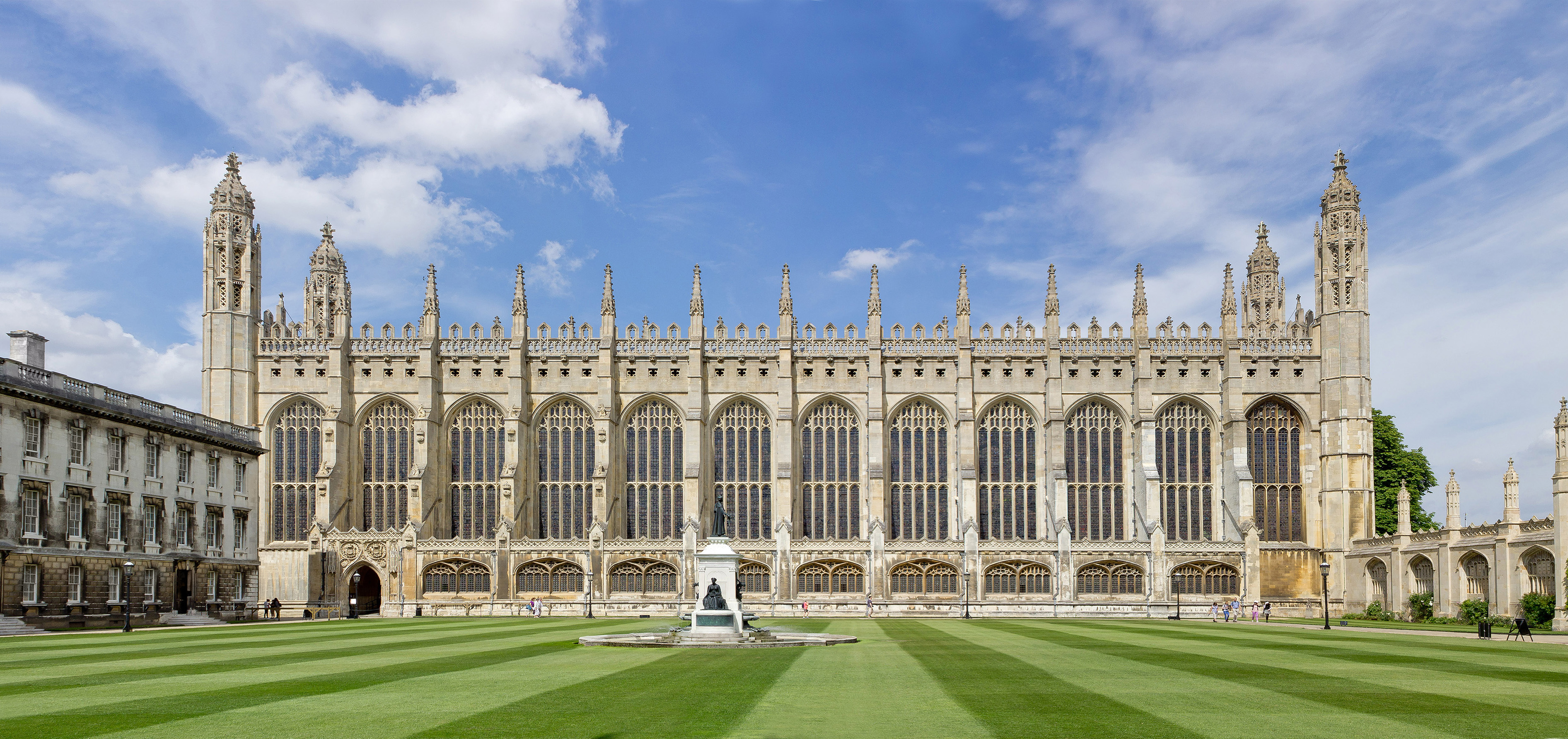
The Chapel of King's College, Cambridge (pictured August 2013), where Briggs was an organ scholar from 1981 to 1984.

Briggs was born in Bromsgrove, Worcestershire, to John Briggs (d. 1979), an engineer (and cellist), and his wife Jane (a violinist), who had met in 1957 while playing in the Birmingham Hospitals Orchestra. Some of Briggs's earliest memories are of hearing his grandfather, Lawrence Briggs, improvise on the organ at St Jude's Church, Birmingham, where he was the organist for over 40 years.

Briggs began improvising on the piano and took lessons at an early age; he was invited to play hymns during assembly at his primary school in Moseley and Christmas carols during services at St Mary's Church, Moseley. From 1970 to 1973 he was a chorister under the music director Roy Massey at St Philip's Cathedral, Birmingham, where he furthered his interest in the organ, occasionally playing the voluntary after Evensong. In 1973 he won a BBC Television piano competition and was awarded a music scholarship to Solihull School, where he studied piano, organ, violin and viola, and in 1976 he gave his first organ recital, at Blackburn Cathedral. He played the viola in the National Youth Orchestra from 1977 to 1981, becoming Principal Viola in his final year. From 1979 to 1981 he also served as organist at the church of St Alban the Martyr, Birmingham.

At the relatively early age of 17 Briggs was awarded a Fellowship of the Royal College of Organists (FRCO), having studied for the examination with Richard Popplewell, and from 1981 to 1984 he was an organ scholar at King's College, Cambridge. In 1982 and 1983 he played during the well-known Festival of Nine Lessons and Carols, heard by millions around the world He also toured Australia, New Zealand, Belgium, the Netherlands and Germany with the college choir.

In 1983 Briggs received the Countess of Munster Award, allowing him to study in Paris with Jean Langlais. Over 12 lessons − half in Langlais's apartment and half on the Cavaillé-Coll organ at Sainte-Clotilde − Briggs studied both repertoire and improvisation. In 1986 Briggs began transcribing cassette recordings of Pierre Cochereau, the organist of Notre-Dame de Paris from 1955 to 1984, whom Briggs had never met but heard once during mass at the cathedral in 1980. Briggs worked on the transcriptions for 11 years, estimating that it took about four hours to transcribe one minute, and returned to the task many years later during the COVID-19 pandemic.

In 1993 Briggs became the first British organist to win the Tournemire prize for improvisation at the St Albans International Organ Festival.

== Cathedral organist ==
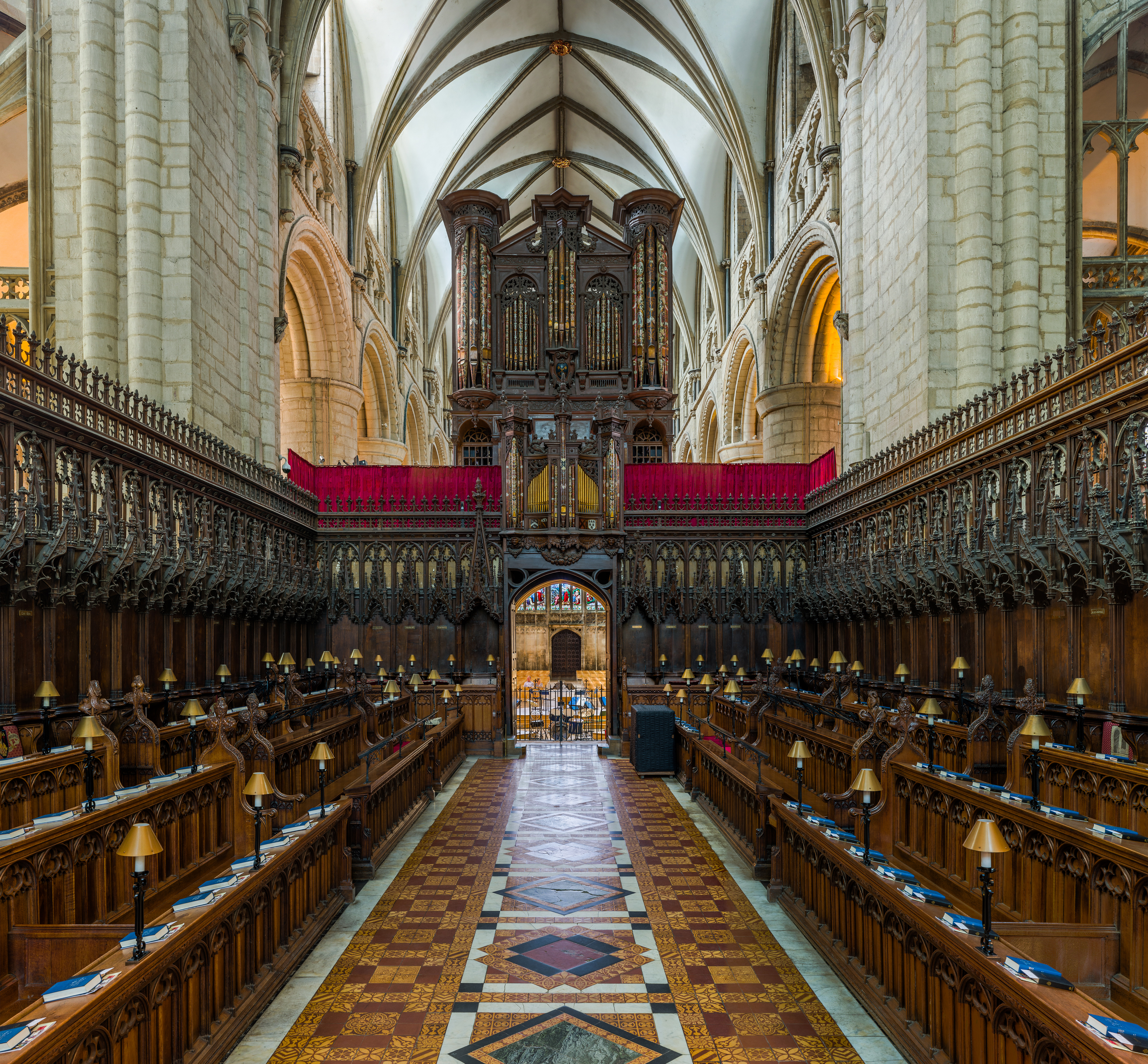
The organ and choir stalls of Gloucester Cathedral (April 2015)

On leaving university, Briggs was appointed as Assistant Organist at Hereford Cathedral, where he also took over the directorship of Hereford Chamber Choir and Hereford String Orchestra.

He was appointed Organist and Master of the Choristers of Truro Cathedral in 1989, before moving to the similar post at Gloucester Cathedral in 1994. While at Gloucester he oversaw the rebuilding of the organ which included the installation of the "divided pedal". This allows the pedal board to be "split", meaning that the pedal stops sound on the lower section, and the upper section can be set to reproduce the sound of any of the manuals. Briggs also oversaw the installation of this system on the Father Willis organ of Truro Cathedral in its rebuild in 1991. During his time at Gloucester, he conducted the Three Choirs Festival (in 1995, 1998 and 2001).

Upon leaving Gloucester in 2002 to pursue a freelance career as a concert organist and composer, Briggs was made Organist Emeritus at Gloucester Cathedral and was succeeded for a second time by Andrew Nethsingha.

== Concert organist and composer ==
Considered one of the finest concert organists and improvisors of his generation, Briggs currently teaches and performs around the world. He gives regular masterclasses at the Royal Northern College of Music and Cambridge University, among others. He is also the composer of over 60 works, mostly for choir and organ.

He made his debut at the BBC Proms on 14 August 2010 as part of Bach Day, playing pieces by Johann Sebastian Bach, some originally for organ, others in arrangements, including Briggs's own arrangement of the Orchestral Suite No. 3 in D major, BWV 1068.

From 2012 to 2017, Briggs was artist-in-residence at the Cathedral Church of St. James in Toronto, Canada. His responsibilities included giving celebrity recitals, playing regularly at services, composing liturgical music for the Cathedral and working on the establishment of a vision for the music programme, including the design and installation of a new organ or organs and relevant acoustical enhancements.

Since 2017 Briggs has been artist-in-residence at the Cathedral of St. John the Divine in New York City. He also served as guest organist at the city's Saint Thomas Church in 2026.

== Family ==
Briggs has been married twice. With his first wife, Elisabeth Baker, he had two daughters: Kerensa (a composer) and Miriam (a singer-songwriter).

He moved to the United States in 2003 and has lived in both New York City and Ipswich, Massachusetts. In 2004 he married Margaret Nimocks, whom he had met at Coventry Cathedral (where his uncle was a lay clerk) in 1980, adopting her daughter Eloise.

== Compositions ==
=== Choir and organ ===
- Truro Eucharist (1990), SATB and organ
- The Music Mountain (1991), SATB, soprano and tenor soloists and 2 organs
- The Noble Stem of Jesse (1996), SSAATTBB, for Gloucester Cathedral choir
- When Waters Kiss One Bank (1996), SSAATTBB, for Gloucester Cathedral choir, words by John Donne
- Holy is the True Light (1997), ATB and organ, commissioned by the Royal School of Church Music America
- Jubilate Deo (1998), SATB, soprano soloits and organ
- O Thou Who Art Unchangeable (1999), SATB, two soprano soloists and organ, commissioned by Virginia Wesleyan University
- Matin Responsary (1999), SSAATTBB for Gloucester Cathedral choir
- Magnificat and Nunc Dimittis (2000), SATB, tenor solo and organ, commissioned by the Three Choirs Festival in Hereford
- Messe pour Notre-Dame (2002), SATB and 2 organs, commissioned by the choir of Keynsham parish church, Bristol
- The Rising (2003), SATB and organ (based on an old Celtic prayer), commissioned by the choir of Church Street United Methodist Church, Knoxville, Tennessee
- Hosanna to the Son of David (2003), SATB and organ, commissioned by the choir of Kirk-in-the-Hills, Bloomfield Hills
- When in our music God is glorified (2003), trebles and organ (with optional trumpet), commissioned by the Bristol Cathedral girls choir for their 10th anniversary
- Ave Verum Corpus (2004), SATB, commissioned by the choir of St Mary's Cathedral, Edinburgh
- Regina Coeli (2004), SATB, commissioned by St. Mary's Church, Moseley, for its 600th anniversary
- Christ's Peace, commissioned by the Rosengren family in celebration of 35 years of marriage
- Music, SATB setting of a poem by Walter de la Mare, commissioned by the Britten Singers, Hereford
- Ave Maria, TTBB and organ, commissioned by the lay clerks of Blackburn Cathedral
- Magnificat and Nunc Dimittis 'The Truro Service' (2004), commissioned in thanksgiving for the life of John Taylour
- Caedmon's Hymn, SSAATTBB for Carlisle Cathedral Festival
- Magnificat and Nunc Dimittis for Jesus College, Cambridge (2008)
- Magnificat and Nunc Dimittis for St Davids Cathedral (2008)
- Messe pour Saint-Sulpice (2010), SATB and organ, commissioned by the choir of All Saints, Northampton

=== Choir and orchestra ===
- Te Deum Laudamus (1997), SATB chorus, soprano and tenor soloists, full orchestra, commissioned for the Three Choirs Festival
- Creation (2000) SATB chorus, soprano solo, full orchestra
- Te Deum Laudamus (2003), TB choir, 2 organs, flute, oboe, 2 horns, 2 trumpets, harp and strings, commissioned for the 150th anniversary of St Benedict's Abbey, Subiaco, Arkansas
- Atlanta Requiem (2003), SATB, soprano, tenor and bass soloists, flute, oboe, trumpet, harp, glockenspiel and timpani
- St John Passion (2005), SATB, soprano, alto, tenor and bass soloists, Evangelist (tenor), Jesus (bass), organ and orchestra, commissioned by the Church of Kirk-in-the-Hills
- Stabat Mater (2022), SATB, organ and orchestra
- Festival of Psalms (2023), SATB, brass quitet and percussion (composed with Kerensa Briggs)

=== Organ ===
- Marche Episcopale (1999), commissioned by the Incorporated Association of Organists
- Transcription of the Improvised Fugue/Toccata on 'I Vow To Thee My Country' (2000), improvisation by Briggs at the reopening recital on the Gloucester Cathedral organ, commissioned by Mark Batten, organist of Birmingham Oratory
- Variations on 'Veni Creator', (for organ duet), commissioned by Elizabeth and Raymond Chenault
- Theme and Variations, commissioned for the Worshipful Company of Actuaries by Catherine Ennis, organist at St Lawrence Jewry, London
- Organ Symphony on themes from the 'Missa pro defunctiis', for Stephen Farr, organist of Guildford Cathedral
- Organ Concerto, organ, strings, harp, timpani, snare drum and glockenspiel, for Blackburn Cathedral
- Elegy, commissioned in celebration of the 80th birthday of Patrick Bell
- 3 Improvisations, a reconstruction of improvisations by the American cinema organist Buddy Cole
- Variations on 'Laudi Spirituali' (2004)
- Variations on Greensleeves (2005)
- Trio Sonata (2005)
- Fantasie (2005)
- Four Concert Etudes (2005)
- Berceuse (2006)
- Mosaique: Sonata for Organ Duet (2008)
- Sortie on In Dulci Jubilo (2008)
- Toccata for St Matthew's Day (2008)
- Hommage a Marcel Dupré (2009)
- Le Tombeau de Duruflé (2009)
- The Legend of St Nikolaus (2009)
- Chorale Variations: Lobe den Herren (2010)
- Fantasia on Mendelssohn (2010)

=== Organ transcriptions ===
- Symphony No. 2, Symphony No. 3, Symphony No. 5, Symphony No. 6 and Symphony No. 8 (Gustav Mahler
- Symphony No. 1 and Symphony No. 2 (Edward Elgar)
- Symphony No. 8 (Franz Schubert)
- Symphony No. 4 (Peter Ilyich Tchaikovsky)
- Symphony No. 7 (Anton Bruckner)
- Sigurd Jorsalfar (Edvard Grieg)
- Daphnis et Chloe, Orchestral Suite No. 2 (Maurice Ravel)
- Symphony No. 3, Final (Camille Saint-Saëns)
- Tone Poem 'Death and Transfiguration' (Richard Strauss)
- Symphony No. 5, The Lark Ascending, The Wasps: Overture, 5 Variants of Dives and Lazarus (Ralph Vaughan Williams)
- Berceuse à la mémoire de Louis Vierne, Suite de Danses Improvisees, Triptique Symphonique, Cantem toto la Gloria, Variations sur Venez Divin Messie, Improvisations sur Alouette, gentille Alouette, Two Improvisations on La Marseillaise, Scherzo Symphonique, Air ('Trimazo') from Suite Française, Gigue ('Compagnons de la Marjolaine'), Bolero sur un theme de Charles Racquet, Entree (Les offices du Dimanche) and Mission Universelle (Improvisations on St Matthew's Gospel) (Pierre Cochereau)

=== Other ===
- Fanfare for Wells (2002), organ, 3 trumpets, 3 trombones and cymbals (a two-minute fanfare (in the style of Marcel Dupré') for use immediately before Hubert Parry's I was glad), commissioned by the Wells Cathedral voluntary choir
- Chempinesca (2004), for piano duet, in celebration of Beryl Chempin, teacher at the Birmingham Conservatoire
- Dreamworld: Song Cycle (2005)

== Discography ==
- Improvisations III (n.d.) Gloucester Cathedral, Briggs label
- Music to rouse the spirit (n.d.) Gloucester Cathedral, Briggs label DBCD5
- Bach at Gloucester (n.d.), Gloucester Cathedral, Briggs label DBCD4
- Great European Organs No. 16 (1990), St George's Hall, Liverpool, Priory Records PRCD284
- O Come all ye faithful (1990), King's College Choir, Cambridge, Decca
- Choral Evensong from Truro Cathedral (Briggs/Henry Doughty) (1993), Truro Cathedral, Priory Records PRCD322
- The Illusionist's Art – Cochereau Transcriptions (1994), Truro Cathedral, Priory Records PRCD428
- Great Organ Transcriptions (1995), Truro Cathedral, Kevin Mayhew CD KMCD1007
- Vivaldi: Gloria (1995), St John's College Choir, Cambridge, and King's College Choir, Cambridge, Decca
- Popular Organ Music Volume 2 (1996) Gloucester Cathedral, Priory Records PRCD568
- Guilmant Organ Works: Volume 4 (1997), Truro Cathedral, Motette 11541
- Mahler: Symphony No. 5 (1998), Gloucester Cathedral, Priory Records PRCD649
- King of Kings: Improvisation to Silent Movie by Cecil B. de Mille (1999), Gloucester Cathedral, Briggs label
- Organ Spectacular (1999), First Congregational Church, Los Angeles, Delos 3241
- Silent Night (1999), King's College Choir, Cambridge, Decca
- Improvisations II (2000), Gloucester Cathedral and Birmingham Oratory, Briggs Label
- Re-Opening of Gloucester Cathedral Organ (2000), Gloucester Cathedral, Briggs label
- Organ Kaleidoscope (2000), Gloucester Cathedral, Priory Records PRCD685
- Great European Organs No. 57 (2000), St John the Evangelist, Upper Norwood, London, Priory Records PRCD680
- Two of a Kind (with Wayne Marshall) (2001), Gloucester Cathedral, Herald AV Publications HAVPCD246
- Christmas Adagios (2001), various, Decca double disc
- The No. 1 Christmas Album (2001), various, Decca
- The World of Organ Transcription (2002), Gloucester Cathedral, Priory Records PRCD79
- Sounds Artistic (2002), Blackburn Cathedral, Lammas LAMM153
- Rossini: Petite Messa Solonelle (Harmonium) (2002), with Stephen Cleobury, King's College Choir, Cambridge, EMI Records
- Simply Christmas (2003), various, Decca
- Fanfare I (2003), various, Gloucester Cathedral, Priory Records, PRCD5000
- Fanfare II (2004), various, St John the Evangelist, Upper Norwood, London, Priory Records PRCD5001
- Sounds French (2004), Blackburn Cathedral, Lammas LAMM164D
- Rossini: Stabat Mater (Harmonium) (2005), with Stephen Cleobury, King's College Choir, Cambridge, EMI Records
- Handel: Coronation Anthems (2005), with Philip Ledger, King's College Choir, Cambridge, EMI Records
- David Briggs Live! (2006), Trinity Episcopal Church, Little Rock, Arkansas, Pro Organo PO7176
- Dreamworld (Briggs' Compositions) (2006)
- Requiem and Organ Concerto (2006), Blackburn Cathedral, Chestnut 002
- Messe pour Notre-Dame (2010), Gloucester Cathedral, with Stephen Layton, Choir of Trinity College, Cambridge, Hyperion Records 67808
- Bursts of Acclamation: Ralph Vaughan Williams – Organ Music and Transcriptions (2016), Sacred Heart Church, Wimbledon
- Music from a Higher Sphere: Symphony No 8 – Gustav Mahler (2016), with Kent tritle, Cathedral of St John the Divine, New York, Pro Organo PO7276
- Popular Christmas Carols: The Glory of Gloucester (2020), Gloucester Cathedral
- Ralph Vaughan Williams: Transcriptions from Truro (2022), with Rupert Marshall-Luck, Truro Cathedral, Albion Records
- Hail, Gladdening Light (2024), with Stephen Layton, Choir of Trinity College, Cambridge

Cultural offices
Preceded by John Charles Winter	Organist and Master of the Choristers of Truro Cathedral; 1989–1994	Succeeded by Andrew Nethsingha
Preceded by John Sanders	Organist and Master of the Choristers of Gloucester Cathedral; 1994–2002	Succeeded by Andrew Nethsingha
