= Signum Records =

Classical musical record label founded in 1997

- Founded: 1997
- Distributors: Naxos Records, Harmonia Mundi
- Genre: Classical
- Country of origin: UK
- Location: Middlesex, England
- Official website: www.signumrecords.com

Signum Records, also known as Signum Classics, is a classical musical record label in the UK founded in 1997.

The label began with a project to make the first recording of the complete works of Thomas Tallis. The artists for the Tallis recording were the Chapelle du Roi, an ensemble of ten singers founded in 1994 by Alistair Dixon, also co-founder of the record label. The other fifty percent of the company was held by Floating Earth sound engineers. Since the Tallis project the label has grown to host many well-known UK ensembles, including The Kings Singers, the Philharmonia Orchestra, the Choir of St John's College, Cambridge, Huddersfield Choral Society, Charivari Agreable, Tenebrae directed by Nigel Short, Voces8, Cantabile and the choir of His Majesty's Chapel Royal, who record at St James's Palace, London.

In 2017 they were named Gramophone Magazine's Label of the Year.
