= Dave Sims (rugby union) =

English rugby union player (1969–2022)

- Full name: David Sims
- Born: 22 November 1969 Gloucester, Gloucestershire, England
- Died: 19 March 2022 (aged 52)
- Height: 6 ft 6 in (198 cm)
- Notable relative(s): Jenny Sims, Ed Sims
- Occupation: Building site manager / former Rugby player

Rugby union career
Youth career
- …
Coaching career
- Years: Team
- …

David Sims (22 November 1969 – 19 March 2022) was an English rugby union footballer, a lock forward for Gloucester RFC. He won three England caps on the 1998 Tour of Hell.

== Career ==
=== Club rugby ===
Born in Gloucester and educated at Churchdown School, Sims is the grandson of former Cheltenham and England player Tom Price. After playing for Longlevens RFC, he made his debut for Gloucester in the 1987–88 season, progressing to the first XV by November 1988. He played for the club for 12 years, including captaining the team for two seasons. He moved to Worcester for the 1999–2000 season before moving on loan to Bedford in January 2000. In 2001, he captained the England National Divisions team against Australia at Welford Road Stadium. He joined Exeter in 2002, before moving on to Launceston RFC, Taunton R.F.C., and then after being released by Taunton joined Wellington RFC, where he filled a player/coach role and took the club to the Western Counties West league. He then became head coach for the Withycombe RFC senior squads, while playing at lock for the 1st XV.

Sims represented The Barbarians on three occasions, in 1995, 1996, and 1999.

=== International rugby ===
Sims represented England at Under 21 level in 1990, before going to represent the country at B, A and senior level, gaining three senior caps on the 1998 England rugby union tour of Australasia and South Africa.
