= John Charles Winter =

English cathedral organist (1923–2012)

John Charles Winter (19 June 1923 – 21 February 2012) was a cathedral organist, who served at Truro Cathedral.

== Background ==
John Charles Winter was born on 19 June 1923 in Bungay, Suffolk. He was educated at Bungay Grammar School

== Career ==
Assistant organist:

- Truro Cathedral ca.1950 - 1971

Organist of:

- Truro Cathedral 1971 - 1988 (later Organist Emeritus)
- Church of King Charles the Martyr, Falmouth 2001 - 2007

Cultural offices
Preceded by Guillaume Ormond	Organist and Master of the Choristers of Truro Cathedral; 1971-1988	Succeeded by David Briggs
