= Choir of St John's College, Cambridge =

Collegiate choir

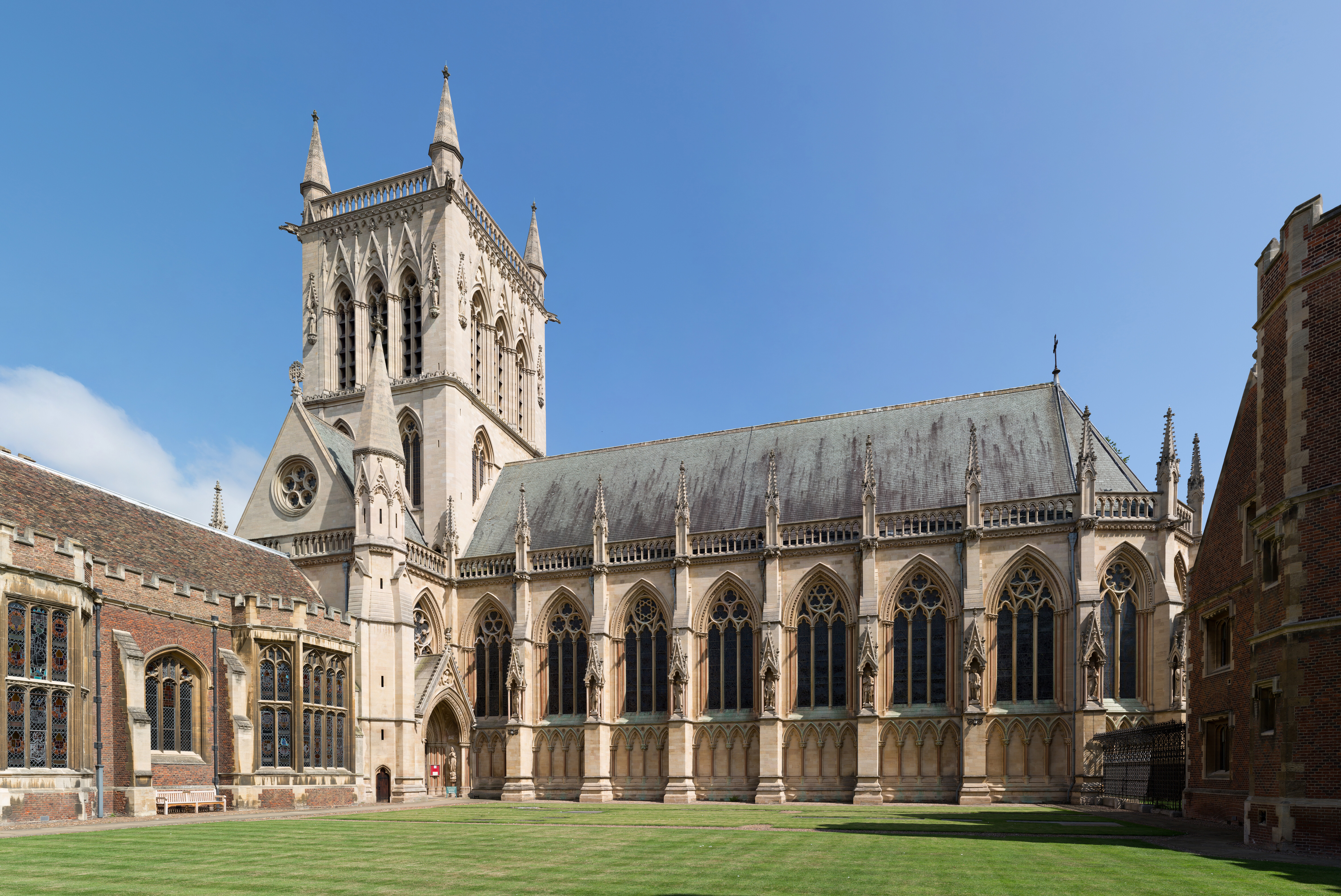
St John's College Chapel

The Choir of St John's College, Cambridge is a historic part of the English choral tradition. It was founded during 1511 to sing the daily liturgy in the Chapel of St. John's College, Cambridge, and, alongside the Choir of King's College, Cambridge, is one of the two most renowned choirs of the University of Cambridge.

Since 1670, the choir has consisted of fifteen choral scholars and twenty choristers and probationers, all of whom are members of St John's College, and many of whom have proceeded to become distinguished musicians.

It has had over 90 of its recordings published.

== Choir ==
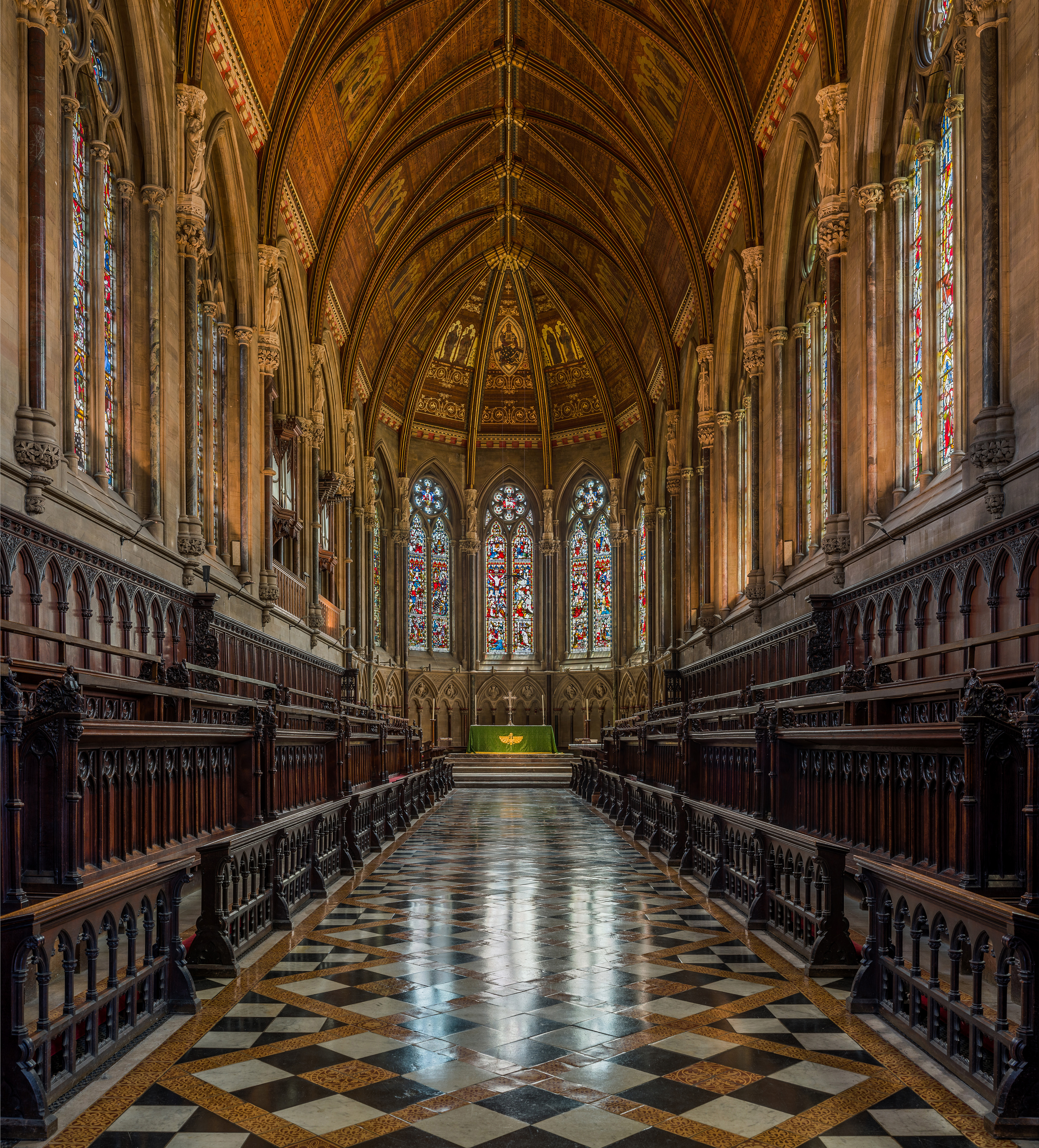
St John's College Chapel

Until 2022, the choir followed the English cathedral tradition of men and boys. In October 2021 it was announced that, from 2022, the choir would admit girls and women. Such a decision has resulted in St John's being the only Oxbridge choir to have both boys and girls singing services together.

The choristers are educated at the St John's College School, at the extreme west end of the college grounds. They travel to and from Chapel wearing a miniature version of the college's undergraduate dress – mortar boards and academic gowns (or cloaks in the winter) over their uniforms. As well as the traditional church choir ranks of head and deputy head choristers, one treble a year is awarded the George Guest medal, in memory of the former organist. Upon leaving the choir, many choristers take up music scholarships at the country's leading independent schools.

The men and women of the choir are either undergraduates at the college or, occasionally, lay clerks (who have generally just graduated from St John's or another Cambridge college). As well as singing with the choristers, they sing one service a week on their own and all services when the choristers are on their half term holiday. They also form the a capella Gents of St John's ensemble, where they also sing lighter music, and are in frequent demand for concerts, May Balls, and many other engagements; they have also recorded many CDs ranging from close-harmony to renaissance music and tour regularly around the world.

== Repertoire ==
Services follow the tradition of the Church of England, generally consisting of a Sunday Eucharist and evensong every day except Monday. Like the other elite cathedral and collegiate choirs, the repertoire extends far beyond the core Anglican pieces. The efforts of organists over the centuries have broadened it further: Walmisley, for example (whose godfather Thomas Attwood studied under Mozart) collaborated with Felix Mendelssohn, while George Guest was a great advocate of contemporary French choral music.

Many composers have written for the choir. Herbert Howells wrote a set of evening Canticles, as did Sir Michael Tippett, who was reputedly attracted by the renowned trompeta real stop on the organ. The college continues to commission new works from contemporary composers, particularly for the Advent and Ash Wednesday services, including recently Bob Chilcott, Philip Moore, Tarik O'Regan, and Dr John Rutter.

== Recordings and special events ==
The choir has an extensive discography, and tends to record two CDs a year. The series of recordings of English church music, recorded under Christopher Robinson and released on label Naxos Records, attracted particular critical acclaim. Under the direction of Andrew Nethsingha, who became director of music in 2007, the choir recorded eleven CDs with Chandos Records. In 2016 the college launched its own recording label 'St John's Cambridge', and imprint on Signum Classics. The first release, in May 2016, was a collection of music by the contemporary composer Jonathan Harvey. This entered the specialist classical charts at number two and won five star reviews in The Observer and BBC Music Magazine as well as an Editor's Choice selection in Gramophone. Upcoming releases include a disc of Christmas music and recordings of masses by Zoltán Kodály and Francis Poulenc.

As well as this, the choir tours extensively, gives concerts in Cambridge and beyond, and broadcasts frequently. The Advent carol service and Evensong for Ash Wednesday in particular are often broadcast by BBC Radio 3 as part of the station's regular broadcast of Choral Evensong. The choir was also the first choir in the UK to webcast its services, releasing a new webcast each week throughout the year since 2008. An archive of recent live recordings taken from these webcasts, SJC Live, was launched in November 2011.

There are occasionally special services in Chapel which add variety to its liturgical life. There is a Lent meditation, an Epiphany service with carols, and, every few months, services in which the choir is joined by another Cambridge collegiate choir. Every year, there is a joint evensong with the Choir of King's College, Cambridge; the venue alternates between King's and St John's each year.

Perhaps the most unusual tradition is the Ascension Day carol. Legend has it that, in 1902, the then Organist, Cyril Rootham was challenged to a bet that the choir could not be heard from the tower roof: the following Ascension Day, they ascended the 163-foot (50 m) tower and proved this to be wrong. The tradition continues; at noon after the sung Eucharist, the congregation (and other visitors) gather in First Court to hear the choir, who, unlike Magdalen College, remain unaided by microphones.

== Notable former choristers, choral and organ scholars ==
- Andrew Carwood (choral scholar), early-music performer and conductor, Director of Music at St Paul's Cathedral
- Allan Clayton (choral scholar), tenor
- Stephen Cleobury (organ scholar), director of music at King's College, Cambridge
- Iestyn Davies (choral scholar and chorister), international countertenor
- Ed Lyon (choral scholar), tenor
- Peter Stanley Lyons (choral scholar and chorister). Countertenor. Director of Music, Royal Naval College, Greenwich; Master of Choristers and Director of Music, Wells Cathedral and Wells Cathedral School; Headmaster, Witham Hall School.
- Jimmy Edwards (choral scholar), comedian
- Christopher Gabbitas (choral scholar), baritone with The King's Singers
- John Gostling, bass associated with Henry Purcell
- Harry Gregson-Williams (chorister), film-score composer (Bridget Jones, Chicken Run, Shrek, Kingdom of Heaven, etc.)
- Ben Gummer (chorister), Member of Parliament
- Robert King (chorister and choral scholar), early-music conductor
- Simon Keenlyside (choral scholar and chorister), operatic baritone and recitalist
- Andrew Lumsden (organ scholar), Organist & Master of the Choristers, Winchester Cathedral
- Clive Mantle (chorister), actor
- John Margetson (choral scholar), organist and diplomat,
- Robert Huw Morgan (organ scholar), organist of the Stanford Memorial Church
- John Scott (organ scholar), director of music of St Thomas Church, New York
- David Pountney (chorister), opera director
- Jonathan Vaughn (organ scholar), organist and choir director

Organ scholars have led the music in St Edmundsbury, Carlisle, and Wells Cathedrals. Former organ scholars George Guest, David Hill, and Andrew Nethsingha have gone on to direct the choir.

== Directors of Music ==
- George Loosemore 1661
- Mr Hawkins 1681
- Thomas Williams 1682
- Bernard Turner 1729
- William Tireman 1777
- Jonathan Sharpe 1777
- John Clarke Whitfeld (1799-1820) then organist Hereford Cathedral
- William Beale 1820
- Samuel Matthews 1821
- Thomas Attwood Walmisley (1833–1856) - simultaneously organist at Trinity College
- Alfred Bennett (1856)
- George Garrett (1857–1897)
- Edward Thomas Sweeting (1897-1901)
- Cyril Rootham (1901–1938)
- Robin Orr (1938–1951)
- Herbert Howells (acting organist, 1941–1945)
- George Guest (1951-1991)
- Christopher Robinson (1991–2003)
- David Hill (2003–2007)
- Andrew Nethsingha (2007–2022)
- Stephen Darlington (interim director of music, 2023)
- Christopher Gray (2023−)
