= Guillaume Ormond =

English cathedral organist (1896–1971)

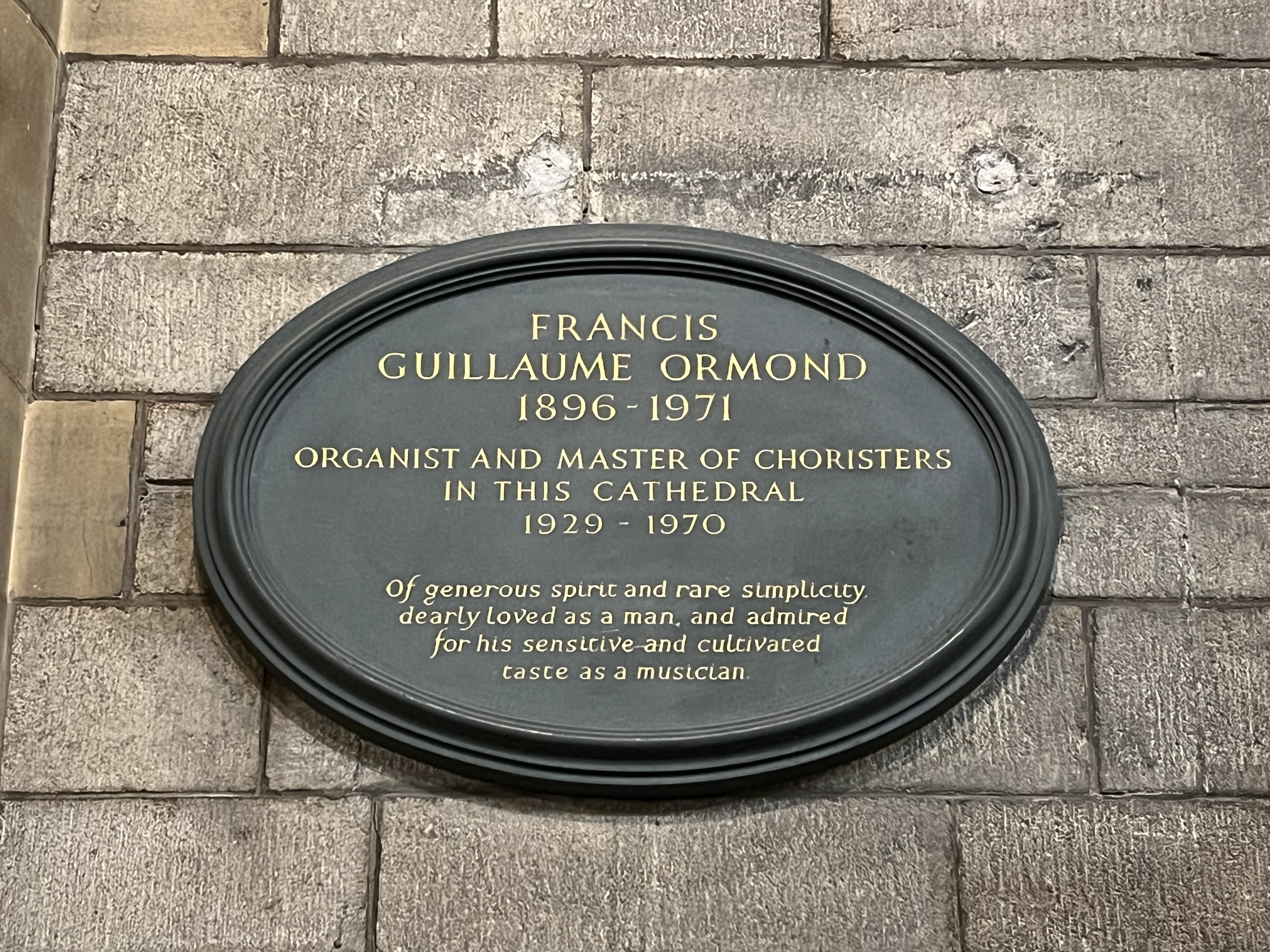
Francis Guillaume Ormond 1896-1971. Organist and Master of Choristers Truro Cathedral 1929-1970.

Guillaume Ormond (1896–1971) was a cathedral organist, who served at Truro Cathedral. He was the nephew of artist John Singer Sargent and uncle of Richard Ormond, who was the director of the National Maritime Museum from 1986 to 2000.

== Background ==
(Francis) Guillaume Ormond was born on 27 January 1896 in Sanremo, Italy.

He was educated at Westminster School and the Royal College of Music and Exeter College, Oxford

== Career ==
Assistant organist:

- Chester Cathedral 1925–26
- Ely Cathedral 1927–29

Organist of:

- Truro Cathedral 1929–70

Cultural offices
Preceded by John Dykes Bower	Organist and Master of the Choristers of Truro Cathedral; 1929-1970	Succeeded by John Charles Winter
