= Christopher Gray (organist) =

British choral conductor

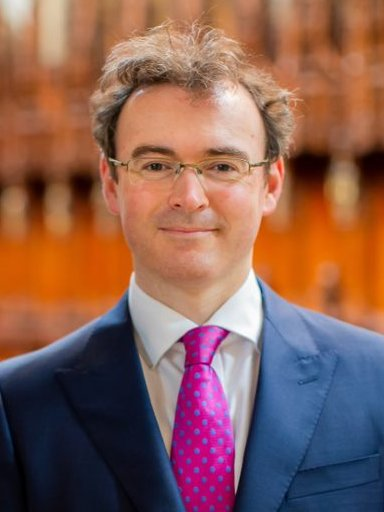
- Born: Christopher Gray; Bangor, County Down, Northern Ireland
- Education: Pembroke College, Cambridge; Royal College of Music
- Occupations: Director of Music, St John's College
- Known for: Director of Music at Choir of St John's College, Cambridge; Truro Cathedral
- Website: The Choir of St John's College, Cambridge

Christopher Gray is a British choral conductor and organist who served as Organist and Master of the Choristers at Truro Cathedral from 2008 to 2023 before being appointed Director of Music at St John's College, Cambridge.

== Early life and education ==
Gray grew up in Bangor in Northern Ireland and was assistant organist at St George's Church, Belfast, before moving to England at the age of 18 for an organ scholarship at Pembroke College, Cambridge, where he studied with Nicolas Kynaston and David Sanger. As a postgraduate student at the Royal College of Music, he was taught by Margaret Phillips and held an organ scholarship at Guildford Cathedral, working with Stephen Farr and Geoffrey Morgan.

== Career ==
Gray was appointed Assistant Director of Music at Truro Cathedral in 2000 and Organist and Master of the Choristers in 2008. During his time there he was responsible for six choral services each week and oversaw the introduction of a girls' choir to complement the existing boys' choir. He also directed the Three Spires Singers and Orchestra as well as community and youth choirs in Cornwall.

In 2022 it was announced that he would succeed Andrew Nethsingha as Director of Music at St John's College, Cambridge, in 2023.

Gray has appeared as an organist in live radio and television broadcasts. Gray appeared on the ITV television programme Britain's Got Talent in 2019, conducting the Truro choristers in "Can You Feel the Love Tonight", which was composed by Elton John for the animated film The Lion King.

== Discography ==
Gray has made recordings as an organist and as a choir director. He has received an "Editor's Choice" and other recommendations by Gramophone magazine.

Preceded by Simon Morley	Assistant Organist, Truro Cathedral; 2000-2008	Succeeded by Luke Bond
Preceded by Robert Sharpe	Organist and Master of the Choristers, Truro Cathedral; 2008–2022	Succeeded by James Anderson-Besant
Preceded by Andrew Nethsingha	Director of Music, Choir of St John's College, Cambridge; 2023-	Succeeded by Incumbent
