= Ed Lyon =

British tenor

Ed Lyon is a British tenor. Though known primarily for singing in baroque operas and oratorios, Lyon has also sung roles in operas by composers from Mozart and Haydn to Stravinsky and Britten.

== Early life and education ==
Lyon comes from Yorkshire and attended Harrow School. He then studied history of art at St John's College, Cambridge, where he was a choral scholar, before training as a singer at the Royal Academy of Music and the National Opera Studio.

== Career ==
Within the United Kingdom, Ed Lyon has appeared for five of the country's six main opera companies. His roles on the main stage of the Royal Opera House include Lysander in A Midsummer Night's Dream, Pane in La Calisto, Hylas in Les Troyens and dancing master in Ariadne auf Naxos. For Opera North, Lyon has sung Tamino in Die Zauberflöte, whilst appearances for Glyndebourne include Hippolyte in Rameau's Hippolyte et Aricie as well as various roles in Purcell's The Fairy-Queen. Lyon has also sung Telemaco in Il ritorno d'Ulisse in patria for Welsh National Opera and Don Ottavio in Don Giovanni for Scottish Opera. He returned to Scottish Opera in February 2016 to sing Lurcanio in Handel's Ariodante. At Garsington Opera he sung the title role in Monteverdi's L'Orfeo in 2022.

Outside the UK, Lyon has sung for opera companies and at theatres including the Bavarian State Opera, the Dutch National Opera, the Teatro Real in Madrid, La Monnaie in Brussels, the Opéra de Lille, the Théâtre du Châtelet, the Aix-en-Provence Festival and the Sam Wanamaker Playhouse, next to Shakespeare's Globe.

Also active as a concert singer, Lyon's repertoire includes oratorios such as Handel's Messiah and Elgar's The Dream of Gerontius, as well as Latin-language religious music like Bach's Mass in B minor and Mozart's Requiem.

== Personal life ==
Lyon is gay and has a keen interest in pet dogs.
