= Churchdown School Academy =

Location
- Winston Road; Churchdown, Gloucestershire, GL3 2RB; England; 51.88186°N 2.17736°W

Information
- Type: Academy
- Department for Education URN: 137634 Tables
- Ofsted: Reports
- Headteacher: David Potter
- Gender: Mixed
- Age: 11 to 18
- Enrolment: 1,416 as of May 2021
- Houses: King; Hillary; Cavell; Edison
- Website: http://www.churchdownschool.com/

Churchdown School Academy (formerly Churchdown School) is a mixed secondary school and sixth form located in Churchdown in the English county of Gloucestershire.

== History ==
=== 1978 arson attack ===
There was an arson attack on Saturday 14 January 1978, costing £120,000. A lecture room block was completely destroyed. It was during the 1978 fire service strike. It took 12 hours to stop the fire. The school was shut for one week.

Four 16 year old males attended court in Gloucester. 16 year old Jonathan McGovern, of Grove Road in Churchdown, received six months on Friday 17 March 1978. John Gaisford of Thompson Way, in Innsworth, received 7 years on 4 May 1978, under Section 53 of the Children and Young Persons Act 1933. He had brought a container of petrol.

=== Academy ===
Previously a foundation school administered by Gloucestershire County Council, Churchdown School was converted to academy status on 1 November 2011 and was renamed Churchdown School Academy. However the school continues to coordinate with Gloucestershire County Council for admissions.

== Curriculum ==
Churchdown School Academy offers GCSEs and BTECs as programmes of study for pupils, while students in the sixth form have the option to study from a range of A Levels and further BTECs.

== Notable former pupils ==
- Mike Teague former rugby union footballer
- Dave Sims (rugby union) former rugby union footballer. Gloucester Captain
- Luke Bond Assistant Organist at St George's Chapel, Windsor Castle.
- Guy Whittingham former Premier league footballer
- James Mann winner of two Academy Awards
