= David Hill (choral director) =

English choral director and organist (born 1957)

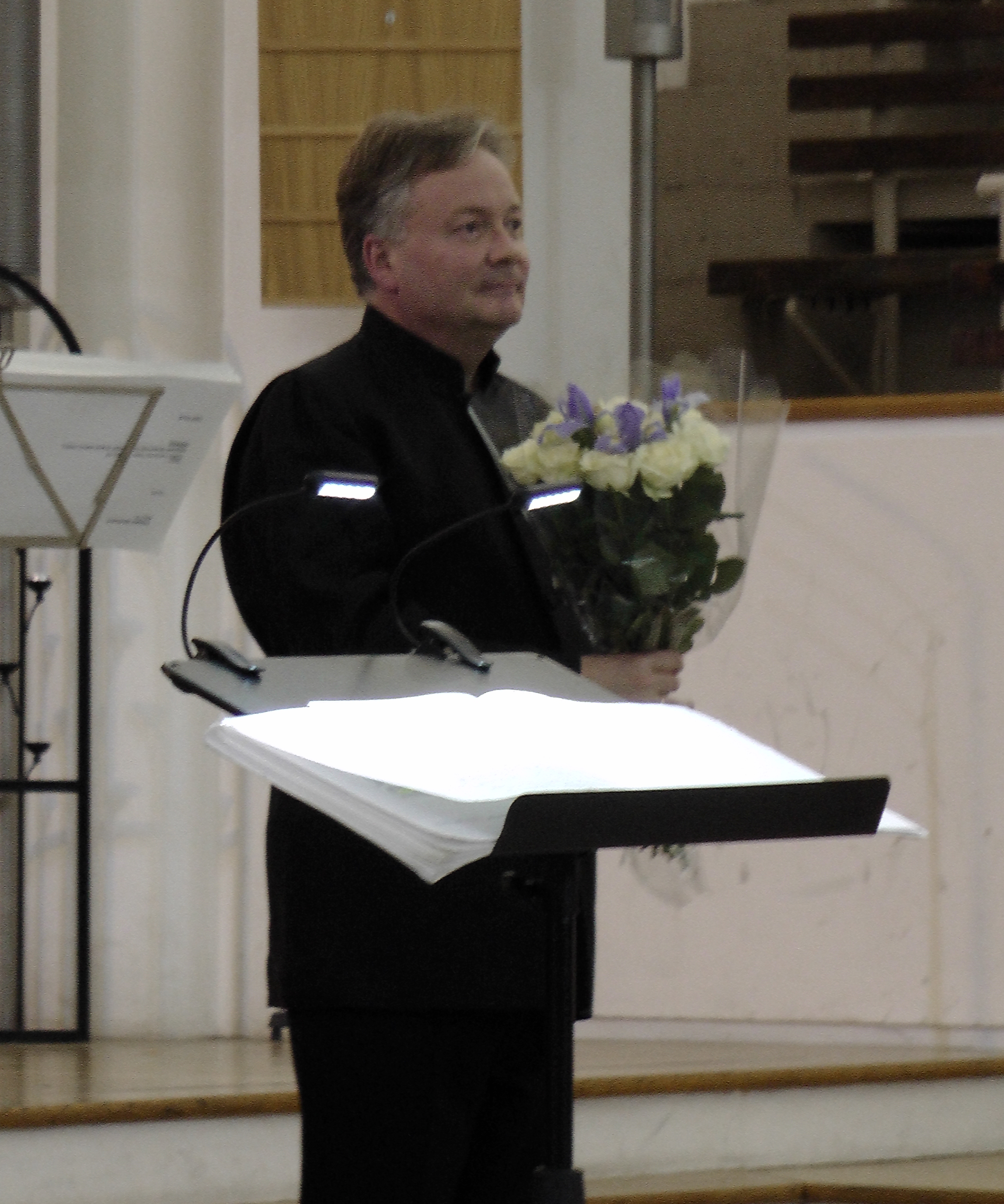
David Hill

David Hill, MBE (born on 13 May 1957 in Carlisle, Cumberland) is a choral conductor and organist. Since July 2013, he is professor adjunct of choral conducting and principal conductor of Yale Schola Cantorum at the Yale Institute of Sacred Music.

He has been musical director of The Bach Choir, London, since April 1998. (He is also president of Bath Bach Choir). He also holds the positions of chief conductor of the Southern Sinfonia, music director of the Leeds Philharmonic Society, and associate conductor of the Bournemouth Symphony Orchestra.

Hill is president of the Incorporated Association of Organists, succeeding Catherine Ennis.

== Media interest ==
He had a part in Coronation Street in 1970 where he broke into the vestry to play the organ and was befriended by Ena Sharples.

== Education ==
Hill was educated at Chetham's School of Music, Manchester, and St John's College, Cambridge, where he was Organ Scholar under George Guest. He spent two years from 1980 as Sub-Organist at Durham Cathedral, under Richard Hey Lloyd.

== Past career ==
He was Master of Music at Westminster Cathedral from 1982 to 1987, then at Winchester Cathedral from 1987 to 2002, before returning to St John's College as director of music from 2003 to 2007. High-profile roles include chief conductor of the BBC Singers from September 2007 until 2017.

== Honours ==
He was appointed a Member of the Order of the British Empire (MBE) in the 2019 New Year Honours for services to music.

Preceded by Stephen Cleobury	Director of Music, Westminster Cathedral; 1982–1987	Succeeded by James O'Donnell
Preceded by Martin Neary	Director of Music, Winchester Cathedral; 1988–2002	Succeeded by Andrew Lumsden
Preceded by Christopher Robinson	Director of Music, St John's College, Cambridge; 2003–2007	Succeeded by Andrew Nethsingha
Preceded by Sir David Willcocks	Musical Director, The Bach Choir; 1998 - present	Incumbent
