= Andrew Nethsingha =

English conductor and organist (born 1968)

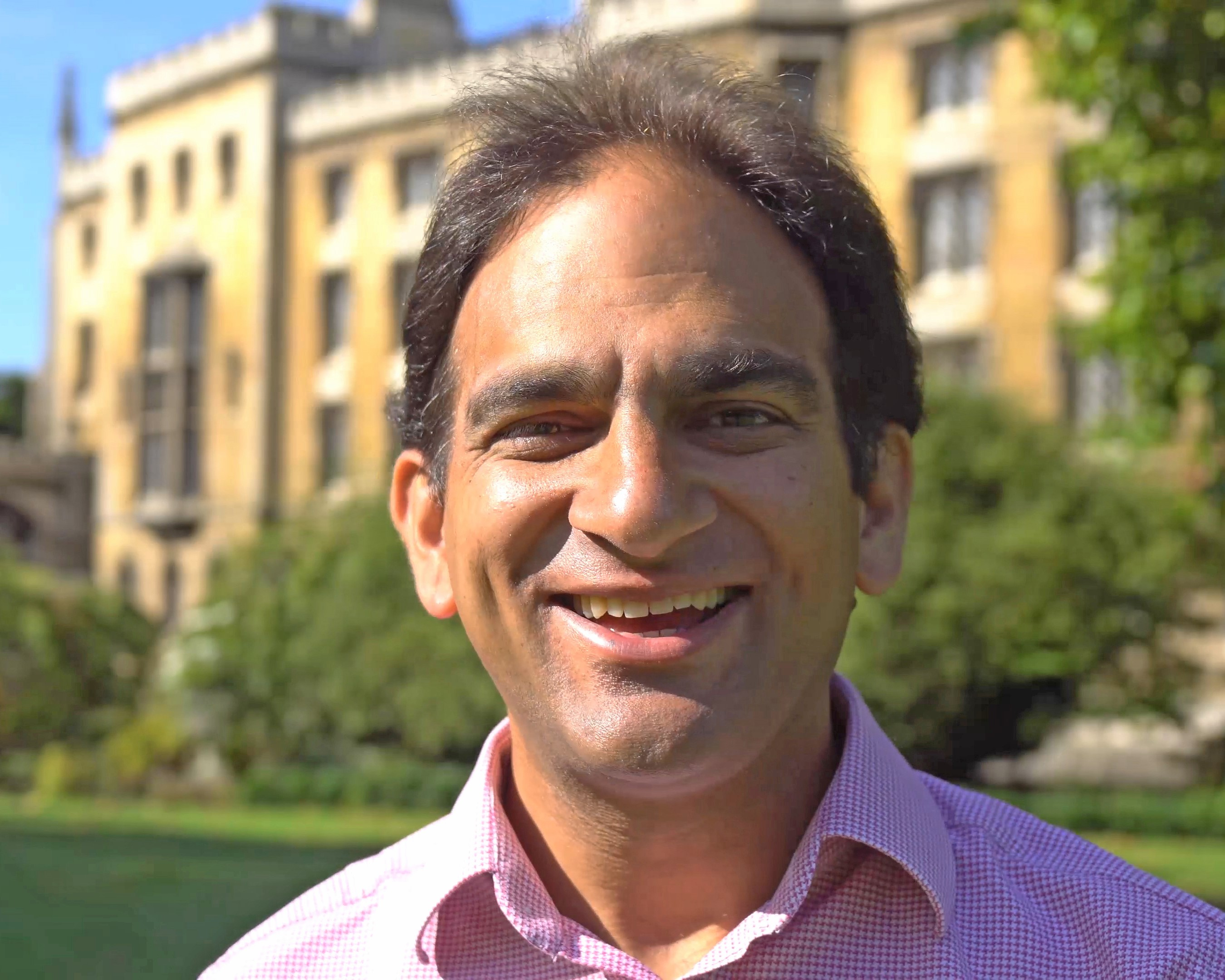
- Nethsingha at St John's College, Cambridge, August 2017
- Born: Andrew Mark Nethsingha; 16 May 1968 (age 58)
- Education: Clifton College; St John's College, Cambridge; Royal College of Music
- Occupations: Organist and master of the choristers, Westminster Abbey, London.
- Known for: Director of music at Choir of St John's College, Cambridge; Gloucester Cathedral; Truro Cathedral; Westminster Abbey
- Website: Westminster Abbey

Andrew Mark Nethsingha, FRCO, ARCM (born 16 May 1968) is an English choral conductor and organist, the son of the late Lucian Nethsingha, also a cathedral organist. He was appointed organist and master of the choristers at Westminster Abbey in London in 2023, having previous held similar positions at St John's College, Cambridge, Gloucester Cathedral and Truro Cathedral.

== Education ==
Nethsingha's early musical training was at Exeter Cathedral School as a chorister of the cathedral, where his father, Lucian Nethsingha, was organist and choirmaster for over a quarter of a century. He was a music scholar at Clifton College in Bristol, where he studied with Gwilym Isaac before gaining an organ scholarship to St John's College, Cambridge. He later studied at the Royal College of Music, where he won seven prizes, and at St John's College. He held organ scholarships under Christopher Robinson at St George's Chapel, Windsor Castle, and under George Guest, both of whom were organists and directors of music at St John's College.

== Career ==
=== Cathedral positions ===
After serving as assistant organist at Wells Cathedral for four years, Nethsingha was appointed master of the choristers and organist at Truro Cathedral in 1994, becoming the youngest cathedral organist in the country. During his eight years there, the reputation of the choir increased considerably. In 2002 he succeeded David Briggs (whom he had also followed at Truro) at Gloucester Cathedral and held the artistic directorship of the Three Choirs Festival in Gloucester and the conductorship of Gloucester Choral Society.

As director of music at St John's College, Cambridge from 2007 to 2022, he helped to set up the recording label "St John's Cambridge" in conjunction with Signum Records. The first release on this label, DEO (with music by Jonathan Harvey), won an award from BBC Music Magazine in 2017. Six recent albums have been editor's choices in Gramophone Magazine. At St Johns, Nethsingha initiated the annual Advent Commission series in 2008 with the support of an anonymous Johnian benefactor, with some of the most recent works composed by Helen Grime, Cheryl Frances-Hoad and Judith Bingham. In October 2021 Nethsingha led the move to admit female singers to the choir, to start in 2022.

In July 2022 it was announced that Nethsingha would succeed James O'Donnell as organist and master of the choristers of Westminster Abbey. He took up his new role at Westminster in January 2023, and in May of that year directed the choirs at the coronation of Charles III and Camilla in 2023.

=== Other work ===
As an orchestral conductor, Nethsingha has led the Philharmonia Orchestra in works that include Mahler’s 8th Symphony, Beethoven’s 9th Symphony, Britten’s War Requiem, Brahms’ Requiem, Elgar’s The Dream of Gerontius and The Kingdom, Walton’s Belshazzar’s Feast, Poulenc’s Gloria and Duruflé’s Requiem. He has also worked with the Royal Philharmonic Orchestra, the City of Birmingham Symphony Orchestra, the London Mozart Players, the Britten Sinfonia, the Orchestra of St. Luke's in New York, the Aarhus Symphony Orchestra and the BBC Concert Orchestra. Venues have included the BBC Proms, the Concertgebouw in Amsterdam, the Verbier Festival, Suntory Hall in Tokyo, the Konzerthaus Berlin and the Singapore Esplanade.

== Personal life ==
In 1996 Nethsingha married Lucy Sellwood, the current Liberal Democrat leader of Cambridgeshire County Council and former Member of the European Parliament (MEP). They have three children.

== Recordings ==
- The Tree: a live album celebrating the heritage of the choir. The album plays with the idea of growth, inspired by the tree in the Book of Job. St John’s Cambridge label with Signum Records, November 2021
- Magnificat 2: a second album of settings of the Evening Canticles. St John’s Cambridge label with Signum Records, April 2021. Gramophone Editor's Choice, June 2021
- Advent Live - Volume 2: a second collection of live performances from Advent Carol Services at St John's College. St John’s Cambridge label with Signum Records, November 2020
- Pious Anthems and Voluntaries: a recording of the nine-part cycle by Michael Finnissy written whilst composer in residence at St John’s College. St John's Cambridge label with Signum Records, 2020. Gramophone Editor's Choice, September 2020 & Gramophone Awards Finalist (Contemporary), 2021. BBC Music Magazine Choral and Song Choice, October 2020. The music was choral nominee at the 2020 Ivors Composer Awards
- Magnificat: an album dedicated to settings of the Evening Canticles. St John’s Cambridge label with Signum Records, 2019. Gramophone Editor's Choice, Awards Issue 2019
- Locus Iste, a collection that takes music from each decade of the 150-year history of the College Chapel. St John’s Cambridge label with Signum Records, 2019. Gramophone Editor's Choice, July 2019
- Advent Live - Volume 1: a selection of live performances from Advent Carol Services at St John's College. St John’s Cambridge label with Signum Records, October 2018
- Mass in G minor: the music of Ralph Vaughan Williams. Joseph Wicks (organ), David Blackadder (trumpet). St John's Cambridge label with Signum Records, 2018. BBC Music Magazine Choral and Song Choice, July 2018
- Kyrie: works by Francis Poulenc, Zoltán Kodály and Leoš Janáček. Joseph Wicks and Glen Dempsey (organ), Anne Denholm (harp). St John's Cambridge label with Signum Records, September 2017
- Christmas with St John's. Joseph Wicks (organ). St John's Cambridge label with Signum Records, October 2016
- Deo: music by Jonathan Harvey. Edward Picton-Turbervill (organ). St John's Cambridge label with Signum Records, May 2016. BBC Music Magazine Award Winner (Choral) 2017

Preceded by Neil Kelly	Organ Scholar, Choir of St George's Chapel, Windsor; 1986–1987	Succeeded by Roger Muttitt
Preceded by Robert Huw Morgan	Organ Scholar, Choir of St John's College, Cambridge; 1987–1990	Succeeded by Alexander Martin
Preceded by Christopher Brayne	Assistant Organist, Wells Cathedral; 1990–1994	Succeeded by Rupert Gough
Preceded by David Briggs	Organist and Master of the Choristers, Truro Cathedral; 1994–2002	Succeeded by Robert Sharpe
Preceded by David Briggs	Organist and Master of the Choristers, Gloucester Cathedral; 2002–2007	Succeeded by Adrian Partington
Preceded by David Hill	Director of Music, St John's College, Cambridge; 2007–2022	Succeeded by Christopher Gray
Preceded by James O'Donnell	Organist and Master of the Choristers, Westminster Abbey; 2023–	Succeeded by
