= Regent Records (UK) =

British record company

Regent Records is a United Kingdom choral music and organ record label and production company based in Wolverhampton.

Founded in 1988 by Gary Cole, the label is run by Gary and Pippa Cole. It currently has nearly 150 commercial releases.

In recent years, Regent has received several Editor's Choices in Gramophone (UK), Critic's Choices in American Record Guide, and in 2010, one release was a Record of the Year in audiophile magazine The Absolute Sound (US).

The label specialises in choral, vocal and organ music. Alongside organists such as Thomas Trotter, professional and cathedral choirs include the choirs of Wells, Winchester, Truro, York and Hereford, Bath Abbey, the Saint Louis Chamber Chorus, the choirs of Selwyn, Christ's and Emmanuel Colleges in Cambridge.
