= Stephen Farr =

British organist (b. 1967)

- Born: 1967 (age 58–59); London, England
- Education: Clare College; University of Surrey
- Occupation: Organist

Stephen Farr (born 1967 in London) is a British organist who is currently the Chief Examiner at the Royal College of Organists and the Director of Music at All Saints, Margaret Street.

== Early life ==
Farr was born in London and grew up in the South East. He attended Eltham College in London, and then, from 1984, Clare College, Cambridge as organ scholar. He graduated with Double First Class Honours in music before continuing at Clare to earn his MPhil in Musicology. He also holds a PhD in music performance from the University of Surrey, where he completed a thesis on Judith Bingham's work. Farr was among the youngest musicians ever to receive funding from the Countess of Munster Musical Trust. His tutors in London included Robert Munns and David Sanger, and receipt of the Worshipful Company of Musicians' W.T. Best Scholarship allowed him to study under Piet Kee in Haarlem, Netherlands and Hans Fagius in Copenhagen, Denmark.

== Career ==
In the years following his time at Clare College, Farr won the Royal College of Organists Performer of the Year Award (1988) as well as a number of international prizes at competitions in Odense, Paisley and St Albans. He worked as sub-organist and later lecturer at Christ Church, Oxford (1990—1996), Assistant Master of Music at Winchester Cathedral, and organist and Master of the Choristers at Guildford Cathedral (1999—2007) He left Guildford in 2007 to freelance and to serve as the Director of Music at St. Paul's Church in Knightsbridge and Music Consultant at Worcester College in Oxford. In spring 2020, he left St. Paul's to join All Saints, Margaret Street as Director of Music.

His concerto work has included engagements with the Bournemouth Symphony Orchestra, Ulster Orchestra, and the London Mozart Players; and he has performed at the Sydney Opera House as a concerto soloist with the Australian Baroque Orchestra. Farr has performed a number of world premieres for famous composers, including Judith Bingham's The Everlasting Crown in 2011 at the Royal Albert Hall; Thomas Hyde's Improvisation on Puer natus in 2012 as part of Worcester College Choir's 2012 CD This Christmas Night; and Cecilia McDowall's First Flight in 2021, performed online during the COVID-19 pandemic. He has appeared with numerous ensembles, including Florilegium, the Bach Choir, BBC Singers, BBC Concert Orchestra, English Concert, London Baroque Soloists, Royal Philharmonic Orchestra, Wallace Collection, Endymion Ensemble, the Orchestra of the Age of Enlightenment, Britten Sinfonia, the Academy of Ancient Music, Polyphony, Arcangelo, the LSO, the Philharmonia, the CBSO and the Berlin Philharmonic. He is currently the Principal Keyboard of the Dunedin Consort. Among the many places he has performed are Westminster Abbey, Odense Cathedral, Notre-Dame de Paris, Grote or Sint-Laurenskerk, the Royal Festival Hall, Copenhagen Cathedral, Westminster Cathedral, York Minster, St Paul's Cathedral, and Århus Domkirke.

In 1997, Farr collaborated with Thomas Adès for EMI's release of Under Hamelin Hill. In 2004, he commissioned David Briggs to compose a new organ symphony inspired by the original solo organ sketches for Maurice Duruflé's Requiem.

Farr first appeared at the BBC Proms in 2011, and has made regular appearances at the festival in subsequent years. He has also recorded numerous CDs for labels including Hyperion Records, Priory Records, and Nimbus Records; he now records for Resonus Classics, with whom he has issued discs of works by Judith Bingham, James Macmillan, Kenneth Leighton, Hieronymus Praetorius, Philip Moore and J S Bach.

Farr was appointed to Chief Examiner at the Royal College of Organists in 2017.

Cultural offices
Preceded by Andrew Millington	Organist and Master of the Choristers of Guildford Cathedral; 1998–2008	Succeeded by Katherine Dienes-Williams
