= Truro Cathedral =

- Cathedral Church of the Blessed Virgin Mary
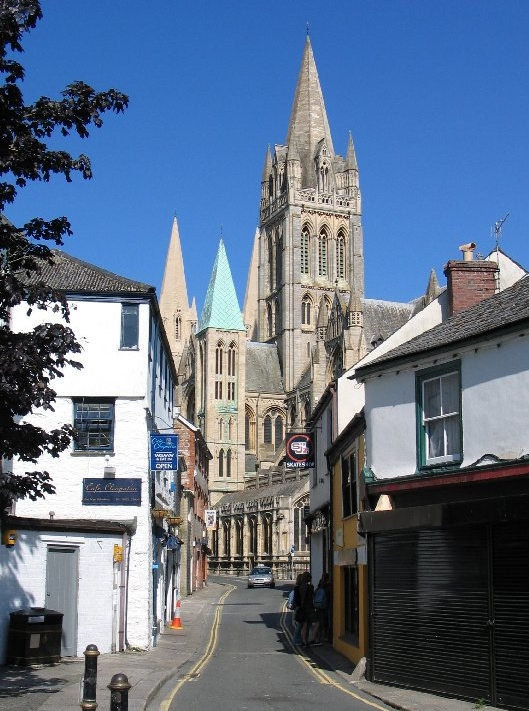

- Location within Cornwall
- 50°15′51″N 05°03′04″W
- OS grid reference: SW 82634 44916
- Location: Truro, Cornwall
- Country: England
- Denomination: Church of England
- Tradition: High Church
- Website: www.trurocathedral.org.uk

History
- Former name(s): The Parish Church of St Mary's, Truro
- Consecrated: 1887

Architecture
- Architect: J. L. Pearson
- Style: Gothic Revival
- Years built: 1880–1910

Administration
- Province: Canterbury
- Diocese: Truro

Clergy
- Bishop(s): Hugh Nelson, Bishop of St. Germans and acting Bishop of Truro
- Dean: Simon Robinson

Listed Building – Grade I
- Official name: Truro Cathedral
- Designated: 29 December 1950
- Reference no.: 1205377

The Cathedral of the Blessed Virgin Mary is a Church of England cathedral in the city of Truro, Cornwall. It was built between 1880 and 1910 to a Gothic Revival design by John Loughborough Pearson on the site of the parish church of St Mary.

== History and description ==
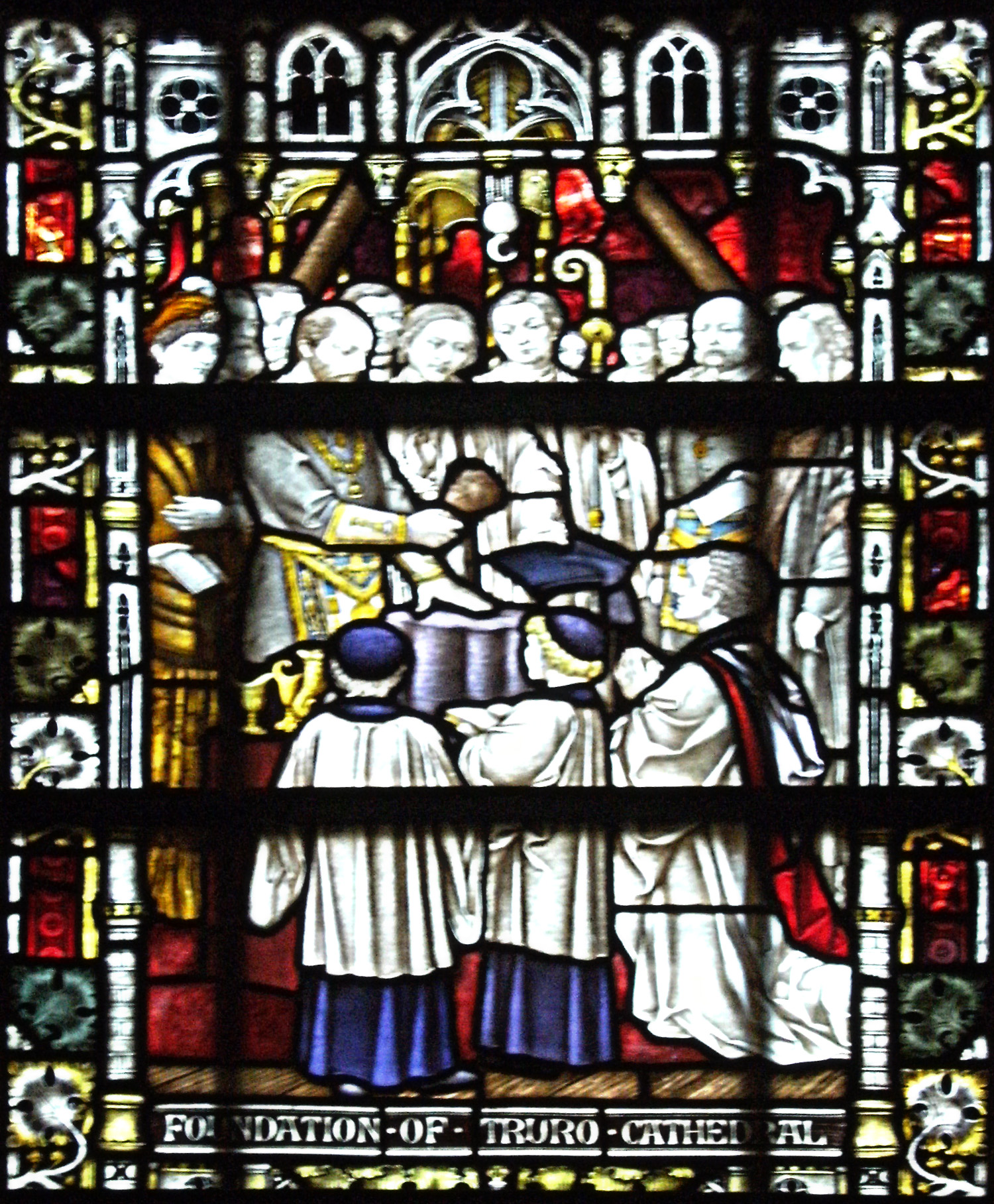
A stained glass window depicting the founding of the cathedral

The Diocese of Truro was established in December 1876, and its first bishop, Edward White Benson, was consecrated on 25 April 1877 at St Paul's Cathedral.

Construction began in 1880 to a design by the leading Gothic Revival architect John Loughborough Pearson. Truro was the first Anglican cathedral to be built on a new site in England since Salisbury Cathedral in 1220. It was built on the site of the 16th-century parish church of St Mary the Virgin, a building in the Perpendicular style with a spire 128 feet (39 m) tall. The final services in St Mary's were held on Sunday 3 October 1880 and the church was demolished that month, leaving only the south aisle, which was retained to serve as the parish church.

From 24 October 1880 until 1887 a temporary wooden building on an adjacent site served as the cathedral. The seats were free and unappropriated, accommodated fewer than 400 people, and were extremely hot in summer and cold in winter. It was in this building that Bishop Benson introduced the new evening service of Nine Lessons and Carols on Christmas Eve, 1880.

The choir and transepts were complete by October 1887. The service of consecration took place on 3 November, performed by E. W. Benson, by then Archbishop of Canterbury. His successor as Bishop of Truro, George Wilkinson, and twenty other bishops were also present, together with civic representatives and diocesan clergy, and about 2,000 other people. The central tower was finished by 1905 and the building was completed with the opening of the two western towers in 1910. J. L. Pearson died in 1897 and his son Frank took over the project. Frank Loughborough Pearson's other works include St Matthew's, Auckland in New Zealand.

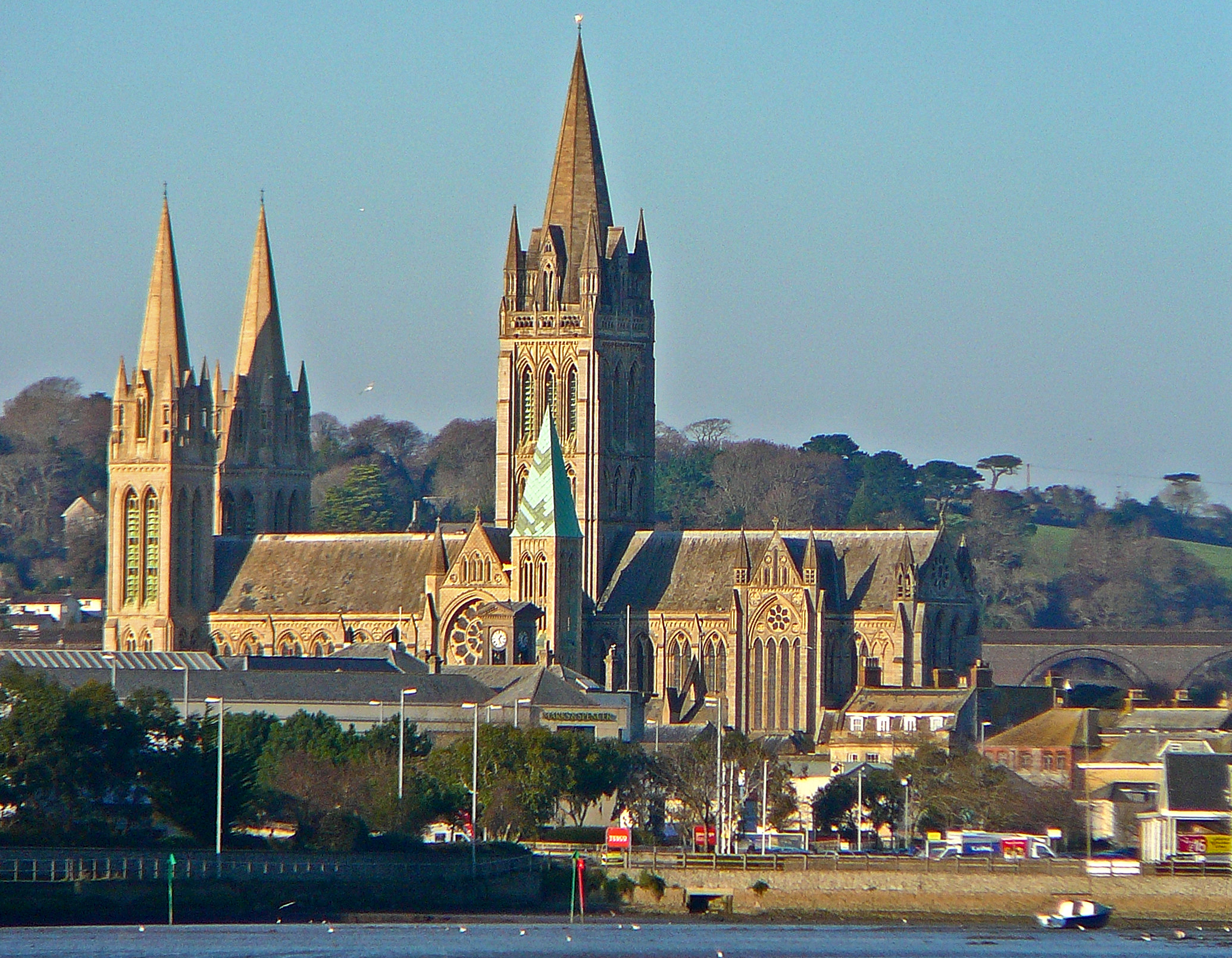
The Cathedral across the Truro River

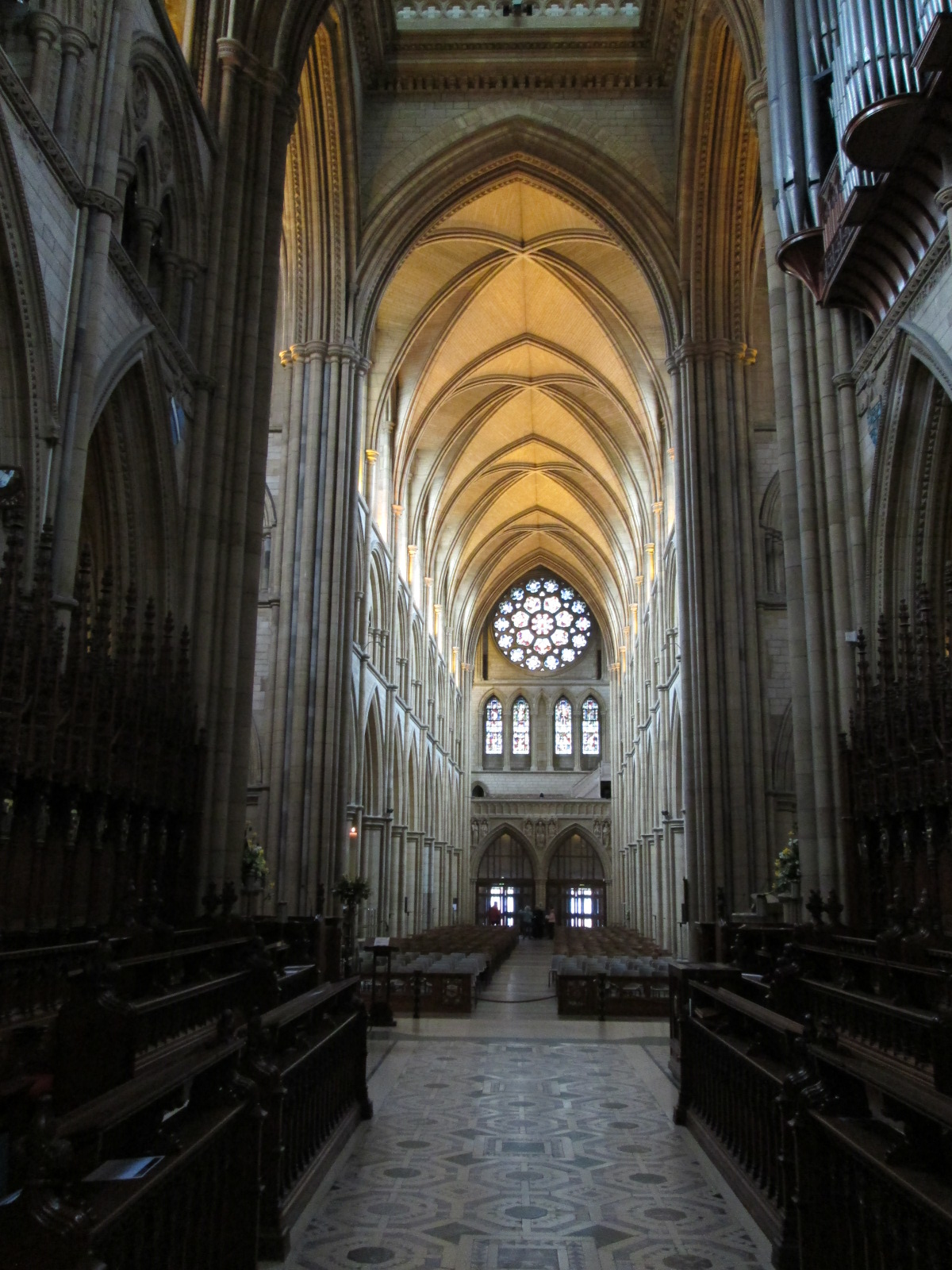
Looking west from the choir, towards the nave and the west rose window

Pearson's design combines the Early English style with certain French characteristics, chiefly spires and rose windows. Its resemblance to Lincoln Cathedral is not coincidental; Pearson had been appointed as Lincoln Cathedral's architect and the first Bishop of Truro, Edward Benson, had previously been Canon Chancellor at Lincoln. The central tower and spire stands 250 feet (76 m) tall, while the western towers reach to 200 feet (61 m). Four kinds of stone were used: Mabe granite for the exterior, and St Stephen's granite for the interior, with dressings and shafts of Bath and Polyphant stone. The spires and turret roofs are of stone, except for a copper spire over the bell tower at west end of St Mary's Aisle. The other roofs are of slate. The cathedral is vaulted throughout. Nathaniel Hitch was responsible for the decorative sculpture, including the reredos.

The original south aisle of St Mary's Church survives, incorporated into the south-east corner of the cathedral and known as St Mary's Aisle. It still functions as the city centre's parish church. Three brasses were described by Edwin Dunkin in 1882: those of Cuthbert Sydnam (1630), Thomas Hasell (1567) and George Fitzpen, rector of the parish. As the cathedral is dedicated to the Blessed Virgin Mary, it has no Lady Chapel.

A Jesus Chapel and the Chapel of Unity and Peace are reserved for quiet and prayer. A chapter house was added to the south-east in 1967; the architect of the new building was John Taylor.

Truro Chapter Act 1878 (Note: Section 1.)
- Act of Parliament
- Parliament of the United Kingdom
- Long title: An Act to make provision for the foundation of a Dean and Chapter for the Bishopric of Truro, and for the transfer to the Cathedral Church of Truro of one of the Canonries in the Cathedral Church of Exeter; and for other purposes connected therewith.
- Citation: 41 & 42 Vict. c. 44
- Territorial extent: United Kingdom

Dates
- Royal assent: 8 August 1878
- Commencement: 8 August 1878 (Note: The Acts of Parliament (Commencement) Act 1793.)
- Repealed: 25 March 1959
Other legislation
Repealed by	Truro Cathedral Measure 1959

Status: Repealed

Text of statute as originally enacted

Upon the foundation of Truro Cathedral, Bishop Benson was authorised to establish 24 honorary canonries. In 1878 a new act of Parliament authorised the bishop to establish residentiary canonries. In 1882 an existing canonry was transferred to Truro from Exeter, whose income enabled the provision of two canonries at Truro. In 1906 the office of sub-dean was endowed, but the position of dean was still held by the bishop, at least until 1925. This remained the case until it became possible to fund the office of dean. The Victorian acts of Parliament which apply to the cathedral are the Bishopric of Truro Act 1876 (39 & 40 Vict. c. 54), the Truro Chapter Act 1878 (41 & 42 Vict. c. 44), and the Truro Bishopric and Chapter Acts Amendment Act 1887 (50 & 51 Vict. c. 12). Preaching duties in the cathedral are shared among the bishop, residentiary canons and honorary canons.

The Royal Maundy Service was held in the cathedral in 1994, when Queen Elizabeth II presented 134 Cornish people with the traditional Maundy money.

== Restoration ==
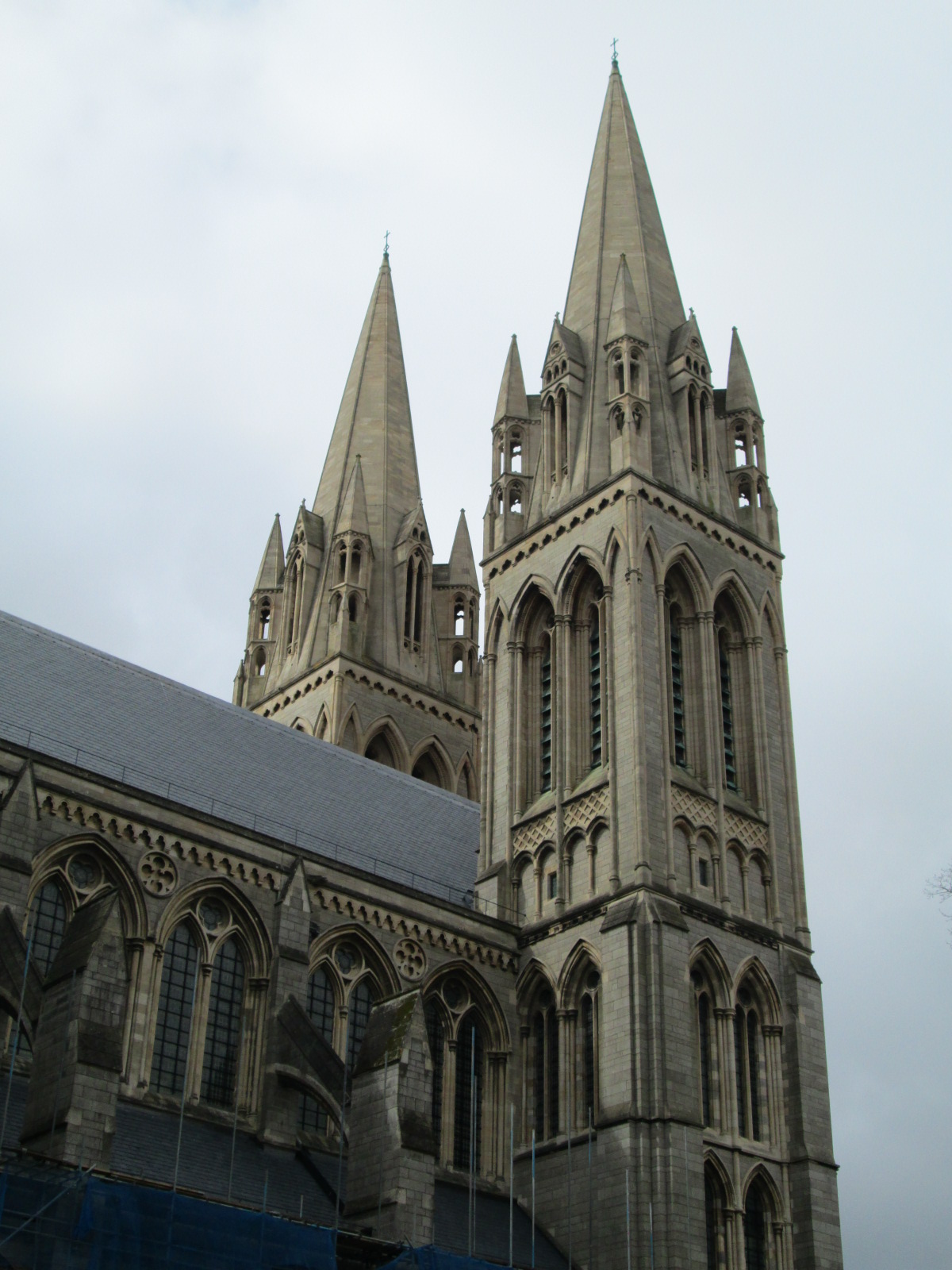
The two western towers

In 2002 the cathedral embarked on what was hoped to be a fifteen-year project to restore the east end, the west front and the central tower and spire. Each of the projects would be undertaken as funds allowed. The east end restoration repaired stonework and damage to the iron work on the stained glass windows. From 2004, a year-long project saw the restoration of the massive west front and towers. In 2009 and 2010 work on the central tower and spire began.

Restoration work is being carried out by W. R. Bedford; Stuart Aston, managing director, said that the problem is the Bath Stone used on the more decorative areas of the cathedral, has not stood up well to the salts and sand in the maritime climate of Cornwall. Erosion of the stonework has left much of the exposed stonework in such a damaged condition that it resembles honeycomb. Funding for the restoration of the tower and spire has been partly met by grants from English Heritage, Friends of Truro Cathedral, the Heritage Lottery Fund, the Tanner Trust, the cathedral itself and by public subscription. The "Save Our Spire" campaign has raised nearly £50,000 towards the cost.

== Governance ==
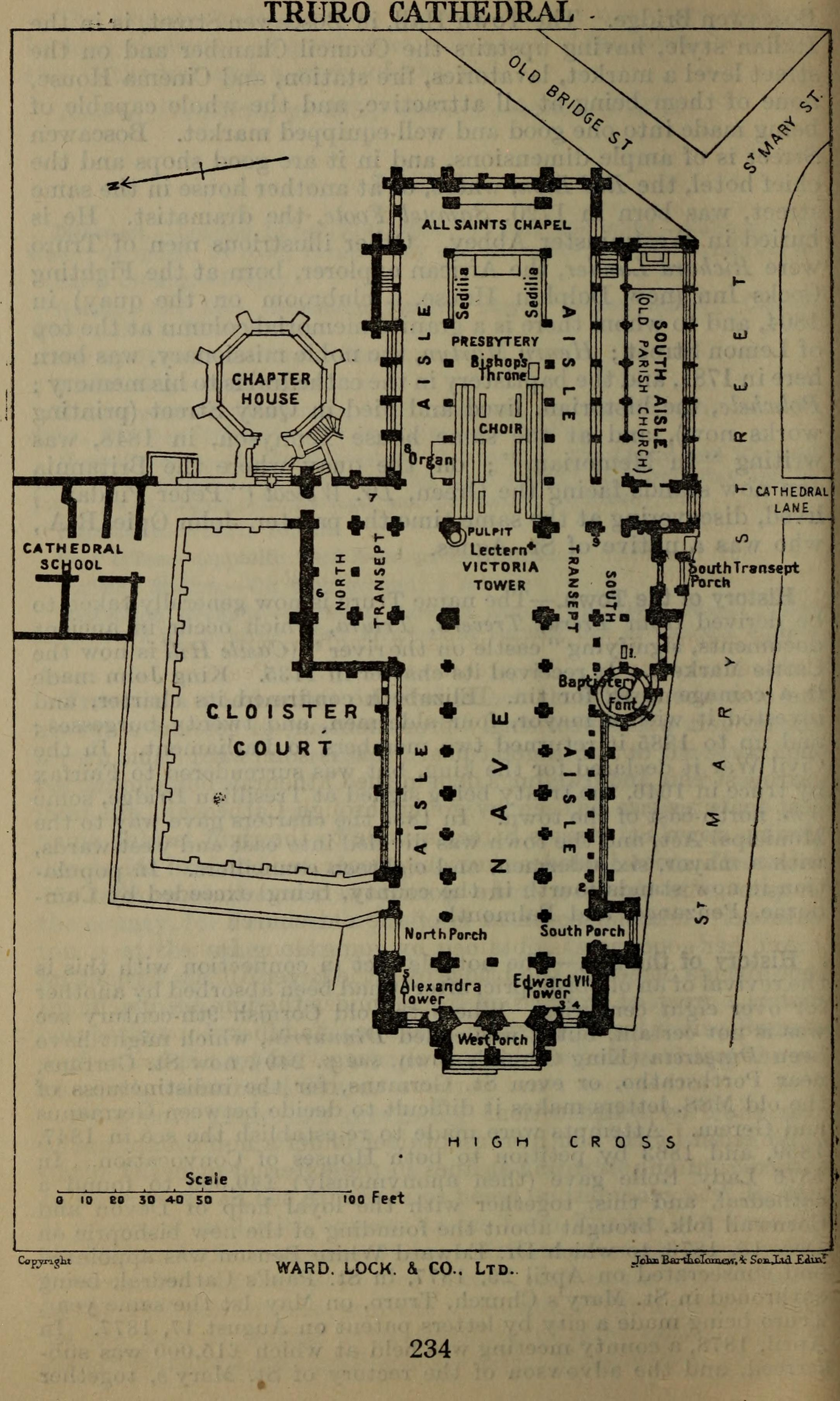
A plan of Truro Cathedral, 1900

The cathedral is governed by a three-tier structure as set out in the Cathedral Measure and Statutes. The chapter (comprising the dean, three residentiary canons and three chapter canons), the cathedral council and the college of canons.

=== Dean and chapter ===
As of 3 October 2022:

- Dean – Simon Robinson (interim since October 2022, announced as permanent dean 17 August 2023) to be installed in Autumn 2023.
- Canon chancellor – Alan Bashforth (since 2014 installation)
- Canon precentor – Simon Griffiths (since 2016 installation)
- Canon missioner – vacant since 2014
- Diocesan canon – vacant since April 2020; Barley was canon pastor and priest-in-charge of Tresillian and Penkevil and rural dean of Powder

== Organs ==
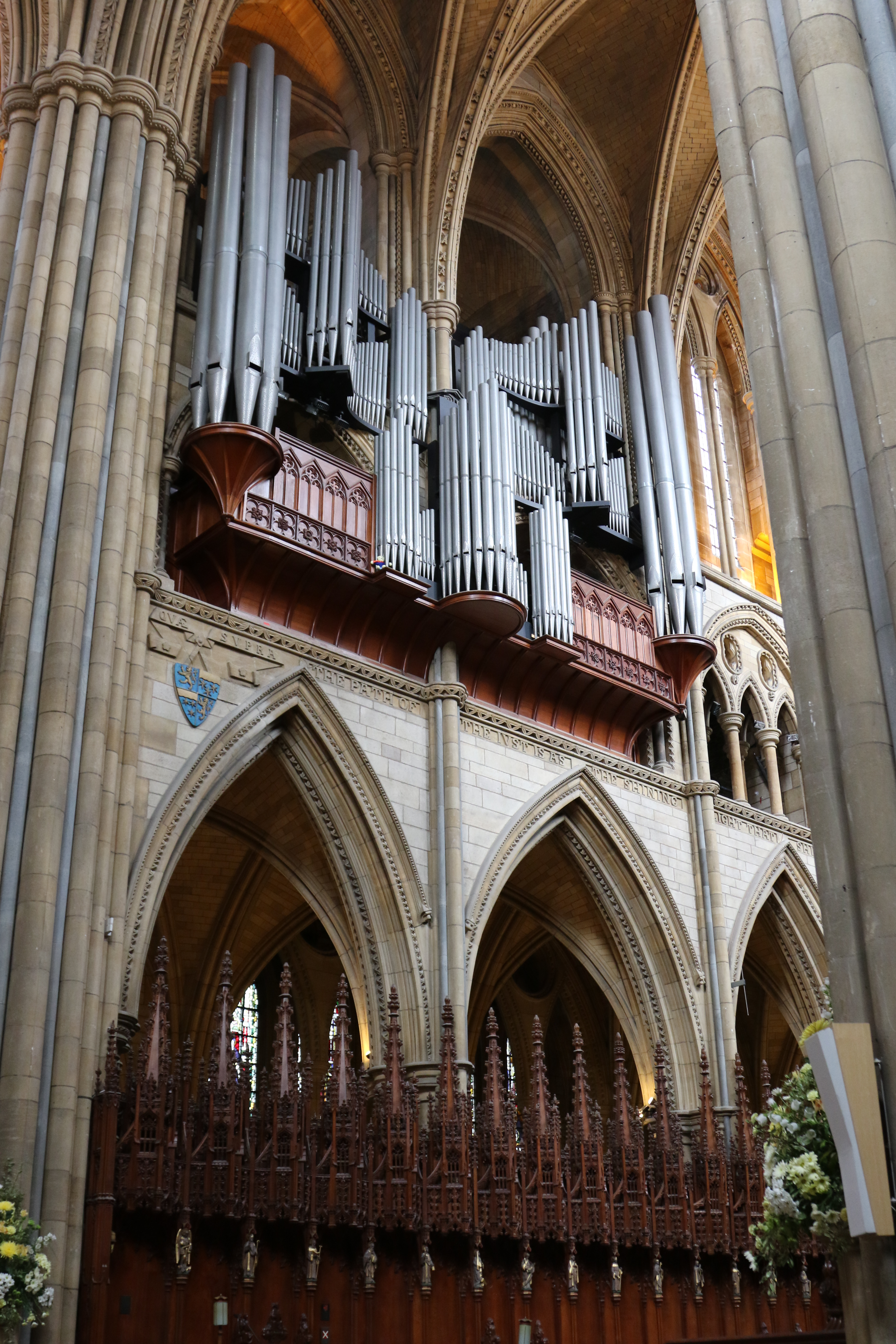
The organ

The Father Willis organ of 1887 is widely regarded as one of the finest instruments in the country. "It is not easy, even today, to think how the magnificence of the Willis organ in Truro Cathedral could be improved" wrote W. L. Sumner in his 1952 book The Organ. It was built in 1887 in London and arrived in Cornwall by boat. It has an almost identical specification to the organ he built a year earlier for the then parish church of St Michael, Coventry (later Coventry Cathedral). Both instruments have the standard Willis hallmarks—tierce mixtures on Great and Swell, characterful gedackts on the Choir, and a small but telling pedal division.

Apart from the addition of the electric blower in the 1920s, no major work was done until 1963, when the grandson of the original builder carried out a conservative restoration, at a cost of some £17,000. Before this time, the organ console was situated high up within the main case of the instrument, necessitating a walk of two or three minutes up a spiral staircase in the north transept. The action was a mixture of Barker lever, pneumatic and tracker. There were very few playing aids and contact between the organist and choir, some 40 feet (12 m) below, would have been almost impossible. In 1963, the organ committee decided to keep the original tonal scheme and voicing, and move the console over on to the south side in a new gallery placed above the choir stalls to a design by the architect John Phillips. Here the organist can hear the instrument properly, and maintain close contact with the choir.

The other main organ in the cathedral is a two-manual instrument in St Mary's aisle, the sole remnant of the former parish church. It was originally built by Renatus Harris and was installed in Truro in 1750 by John Byfield. It was re-installed in the temporary church in 1880, but was significantly rebuilt and reduced in size in 1887 for installation in its current location. There is also a four-stop continuo organ by Kenneth Tickell.

In 2012, songwriter Sir Tim Rice backed the 125-year anniversary appeal to support Truro Cathedral's choir and music.

=== Organists ===
Organist and Master of the Choristers

- 1876 William Mitchell
- 1881 George Robertson Sinclair (later organist of Hereford Cathedral: the G. R. S. of Elgar's Enigma Variations)
- 1890 Mark James Monk
- 1920 Hubert Stanley Middleton (later organist of Ely Cathedral and Trinity College, Cambridge)
- 1926 John Dykes Bower (afterwards organist of New College Oxford; Durham Cathedral; and St Paul's Cathedral; knighted 1968)
- 1929 Francis Guillaume Ormond
- 1971 John Charles Winter (later Organist Emeritus)
- 1989 David Briggs (later organist of Gloucester Cathedral and currently artist-in-residence at the Cathedral of St. John the Divine in New York City.
- 1994 Andrew Nethsingha (currently director of music at Westminster Abbey)
- 2002 Robert Sharpe (currently director of music at York Minster)
- 2008 Christopher Gray (currently director of music at St. John's College, Cambridge)
- 2023 James Anderson-Besant

Assistant Organists

- Ivor Atkins 1885–1886 (later assistant organist of Hereford Cathedral and organist of Worcester Cathedral; knighted 1921)
- Frederick C. Thomas until 1896
- Frederick Rowland Tims 1902–1907 (later organist of Croydon Minster)
- William Stanley Sutton 1907–1911
- Mr Hall 1911
- Donald Behenna
- Gerald Hocken Knight 1922–1926 (later organist of Canterbury Cathedral and Director of the Royal School of Church Music)
- Arthur William Baines 1933-1938 (afterwards organist and director of music at King's College, Taunton)
- Robert Strong ca. 1948
- John Charles Winter 1950 – 1971 (later Organist and Organist Emeritus)
- Henry Doughty 1971–1991
- Simon Morley 1991–2000 (currently organist and director of music at St John's Episcopal Church, Tampa, Florida)
- Christopher Gray 2000–2008 (later Organist)
- Luke Bond 2008–2017 (currently assistant director of music of St George's Chapel, Windsor Castle)
- Joseph Wicks 2017–2019
- Michael Butterfield 2019-2020 (currently organist of Marlborough College)
- Andrew Wyatt 2020– (Former Assistant Organist at Hexham Abbey)

Organ Scholars

- Luke Bond 1998–1999 (later Assistant Organist 2008–2017)
- Christopher Teel 1999–2000 (currently director of music at Christ The Servant Lutheran Church, Houston, Texas)
- Andrew Senn 2000–2001 (currently director of music at The First Presbyterian Church in Philadelphia, and organist for Reform Congregation Keneseth Israel in Elkins Park, Pennsylvania)
- Nicholas Wearne 2001–2002 (later assistant organist at St Mary's Cathedral, Edinburgh (Episcopal) and St Martin-in-the-Fields, London)
- Michael Phillips 2002 (later director of music and organist at St Luke's Episcopal Church, Dallas, Texas, currently organist at Redeemer Presbyterian Church, Austin, Texas)
- Tom Wilkinson 2003–2004 (currently organist at University of St Andrews)
- Claire Cousens 2004–2005
- Tom Little 2005–2006 (currently director of music at Christ Church Cathedral, Dublin)
- David Moore 2006–2007 (later assistant director of music at St John-at-Hampstead Parish Church, London)
- Shiloh Roby 2007–2008 (later organ scholar of St Patrick's Cathedral, Dublin, currently associate director of music at Christ Church Cathedral, Cincinnati)
- Joshua Hales 2008–2009 (later organ scholar at Exeter College, Oxford and Salisbury Cathedral, later still assistant director of music at Sheffield Cathedral)
- Donald Hunt 2009–2010 (currently assistant organist at St Mary's Cathedral, Edinburgh (Episcopal))
- Sachin Gunga 2010–2011 (currently sub-organist at Portsmouth Cathedral)
- Edward Symington 2011–2012 (afterwards organ scholar at Westminster Cathedral)
- Harry Meehan 2012–2013 (afterwards organ scholar at The Queen's College, Oxford and later assistant organist at Christ Church Cathedral, Christchurch, New Zealand)
- Rachel Mahon 2013–2014 (currently director of music at Coventry Cathedral)
- James Orford 2014–2015 (later organ scholar at St Paul's Cathedral, organist and assistant director of music at St Paul's Church, Knightsbridge, currently organist of St Paul's Cathedral)
- Joseph O’Berry 2015–2016 (currently assistant director of music at the Cathedral of St. John in the Wilderness, Denver, Colorado)
- Käthe Wright Kaufman 2016–2017 (later organ scholar at Peterborough Cathedral, currently associate director of music and worship arts at Glenn Memorial United Methodist Church and Chapel Organist at the Candler School of Theology, Emory University campus, Atlanta, Georgia)
- William Fairbairn 2017–2018 (currently assistant director of music at St Marylebone Parish Church, London)
- Carolyn Craig 2018–2019 (currently assistant director of music at Wells Cathedral)
- Manuel Piazza 2019–2020 (currently assistant director of music at St. Thomas's Anglican Church (Toronto) Canada)
- Alden Wright 2021–2022 (currently director of music at Christ Episcopal Church of Pittsford, NY)
- Tom Dilley 2022–2023
- Jeremiah Mead 2023–2024
- Jeremy Wan 2024-2025
- Alfie Beston 2025-

== Bells ==
A ring of ten bells was cast in 1909 by John Taylor & Co of Loughborough: the tenor bell weighs 33 long cwt 3 qr 10 lb (3,790 lb or 1,719 kg). Four further bells, also cast by Taylor, were installed in 2011: two completing the original ring to twelve, and two smaller ones to give the option of a lighter sound. In addition there are six bells in the Green Tower, previously in St Mary's Parish Church, of which five form a chiming peal. A planned great bourdon bell for the south-west tower was never made.

== Choir ==
Truro Cathedral has had an unbroken choral tradition dating from 1876. The present-day choir has twelve adult singers who are either lay vicars or choral scholars, accompanied by either eighteen boy choristers or eighteen girl choristers. After the closure of Truro Cathedral School in 1982, the cathedral no longer has a dedicated cathedral school. Instead, the choristers are awarded bursaries to attend Truro School.

Girl choristers were first admitted to the cathedral choir in 2015. On International Women's Day in 2017 they appeared for the first time in a broadcast of the BBC Radio 3 programme Choral Evensong. The service included the first performance of two new works, namely a set of canticles by Dobrinka Tabakova and a set of responses by Sasha Johnson-Manning. The cathedral's girl choristers were also among those selected to sing at the coronation of Charles III and Camilla in 2023.

The choir appeared on the 2019 season of Britain's Got Talent.

== Café ==
A café or restaurant was present in Truro Cathedral from at least 2004 to late 2023.

=== Truro Cathedral Restaurant ===
Truro Cathedral Restaurant, located in the Chapter House at the rear of the cathedral, served Breakfast and Lunch as well as freshly baked cakes and snacks. Once a month, a traditional Sunday lunch was served in carvery style. From November to December, Christmas dinners were also available. From February to July, the restaurant offered Wednesday Specials on breakfast and carvery lunches.

By late 2022 its menu had been reduced with hot meals being subject to availability on the day.

=== Common Grounds Café ===
It was announced in early 2023 that restructuring would be undertaken with Common Grounds Café superseding Truro Cathedral Restaurant. It would start as a temporary pop-up in the North Transept area on the cathedral floor before moving to where the old shop used to be.

It would have a reduced menu focusing on "sweet treats" and sandwiches. Hot drinks served included Coffee from Olfactory Coffee Roasters, a Cornish speciality coffee company based in Penryn, and Tugboat Tea, a local Truro tea and coffee shop.

=== Closure ===
On 7 December 2023, a newsletter was published explaining that Truro Cathedral Limited, which operated the café and shop, was to enter a dormant state at the end of the year owing to financial challenges. Subsequently, Common Grounds Café's last day of operation was 23 December 2023.

== See also ==
- List of cathedrals in the United Kingdom
- List of topics related to Cornwall
- List of new ecclesiastical buildings by J. L. Pearson
