= Camidge =

Camidge is a surname of English origin. People with that name include:

- Camidge family, several of whom were organists at York Minster (from 1756), some of whom have standalone articles (see below)
- Charles Camidge (1838–1911), Anglican Bishop of Bathurst
- John Henry Norrison Camidge (1853–1939), British composer and organist
- Thomas Simpson Camidge (1828–1913), British organist and composer
- Walter Camidge (1912–1987), also known as William A Camidge, English footballer
- William Camidge (1828–1909), British solicitor and author
