= Pomp and Circumstance Marches =

Series of marches for orchestra composed by Sir Edward Elgar

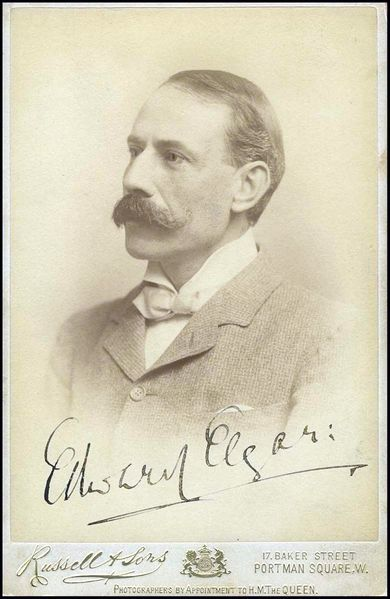
Elgar in 1904

The Pomp and Circumstance Marches are a series of five marches for orchestra composed by Edward Elgar between 1901 and 1930, together with a sixth march created in 2006 by Anthony Payne from Elgar's sketches. The five original marches were dedicated to the composer's friends the conductor Alfred E. Rodewald, the composer Granville Bantock and the organists Ivor Atkins, G. R. Sinclair and Percy Hull.

In England, the first, and best-known, of the marches is an established feature at the Last Night of the Proms every year, and in the US and elsewhere its slow middle section is traditionally played as the processional tune at most high school and college graduation ceremonies.

== Origin of the name ==
Elgar took the phrase "Pomp and Circumstance" from Act 3, Scene 3 of Shakespeare's Othello:

Farewell the neighing steed and the shrill trump,
The spirit-stirring drum, th'ear-piercing fife,
The royal banner, and all quality,
Pride, pomp, and circumstance of glorious war!

Additionally, on the score of the first march, Elgar set as a motto for the whole set of marches a verse from Lord de Tabley's poem "The March of Glory", which (as quoted by Elgar's biographer Basil Maine) begins:

Like a proud music that draws men on to die
Madly upon the spears in martial ecstasy,
A measure that sets heaven in all their veins
And iron in their hands.
I hear the Nation march
Beneath her ensign as an eagle's wing;
O'er shield and sheeted targe
The banners of my faith most gaily swing;
Moving to victory with solemn noise,
With worship and with conquest, and the voice of myriads.

The composer said that the title "is merely a generic name for what is a set of six marches. Two … have already appeared and the others will come later. One of them is to be a soldier's funeral march".

== Marches ==
The Pomp and Circumstance marches are

- March No. 1 in D major (1901)
- March No. 2 in A minor (1901)
- March No. 3 in C minor (1904)
- March No. 4 in G major (1907)
- March No. 5 in C major (1930)
- March No. 6 in G minor (written as sketches, elaborated by Anthony Payne in (2005)–(2006))

The first five were all published by Boosey & Co. as Elgar's opus 39, and each of the marches is dedicated to a particular musical friend of Elgar's. The sixth march, completed and orchestrated by Anthony Payne was published by Boosey & Hawkes in 2006.

The marches are all similarly short in duration. Elgar's own gramophone recordings, made between 1926 and 1930, take 4m 25s (No. 1); 4m 03s (No. 2); 4m 35s (No. 3); 4m 36s (No. 4) and 4m 15s (No. 5). Later conductors have generally taken slightly slower tempi. (Note: Elgar's total playing time for the suite of five marches is 21m 54s. Of later recordings, Sir Adrian Boult's 1977 set takes a total of 25m 1s; Sir Andrew Davis's 2012 set takes 28m 44s, Sir John Barbirolli's 1960s set, 29m 3s; and Vladimir Ashkenazy's 2009 set totals, 29m 19s.) Payne's completion of the sixth march is longer in duration, at eight minutes or a little over.

=== March No. 1 in D ===
Opening of the first Pomp and Circumstance March, published in 1902

==== Dedication ====
March No. 1, was composed in 1901 and dedicated "to my friend Alfred E. Rodewald and the members of the Liverpool Orchestral Society".

==== Instrumentation ====
The instrumentation is: two piccolos (2nd ad lib.), two flutes, two oboes, two clarinets in A, bass clarinet in A, two bassoons, contrabassoon, four horns in F, two trumpets in F, two cornets in A, three trombones, tuba, three timpani, percussion (bass drum, cymbals, triangle, side drum, jingles, glockenspiel (ad. lib.) and tambourine (ad lib.)), two harps, organ, and strings.

==== History ====
The best-known of the six marches, Pomp and Circumstance March No. 1 had its premiere, along with the second march, in Liverpool on 19 October 1901, conducted by the composer. (Note: It was long believed that the dedicatee of No. 1, Alfred Rodewald, conducted the two marches at the premiere: the Elgar expert Jerrold Northrop Moore wrote in 1984, "[Elgar] and Alice went to Liverpool for Rodewald's première of the two Pomp and Circumstance Marches. The success of the first March especially was frantic", but research for the Elgar Society shows that Elgar conducted the two marches. Rodewald conducted the other items in the concert programme. The Liverpool Mercury for 21 October 1901 reported "Dr Elgar's two new military marches 'Pomp and Circumstance' were also given, this being the first time of their performance, Dr Elgar himself conducting them". Rodewald is recorded by the paper as the conductor for the other items on the programme.) Both marches were played two days later at a promenade concert in the Queen's Hall London, conducted by Henry Wood, with March No. 1 played second. Wood remembered that the audience "… rose and yelled … the one and only time in the history of the Promenade concerts that an orchestral item was accorded a double encore." The piece has been played in all but six of the Prom seasons since 1901, and in every one since 1944, conducted by Wood and twenty-five later conductors. (Note: The later conductors were Basil Cameron, Sir Adrian Boult, Sir Malcolm Sargent, Sir Colin Davis, Norman Del Mar, Sir Charles Groves, James Loughran, Sir Charles Mackerras, Vernon Handley, Raymond Leppard, Sir Mark Elder, Sir Andrew Davis, Sir John Pritchard, Barry Wordsworth, Rumon Gamba, Leonard Slatkin, Paul Daniel, Jiří Bělohlávek, Sir Roger Norrington, David Robertson, Edward Gardner, Marin Alsop, Sakari Oramo, Dalia Stasevska and Elim Chan.)

The trio contains the tune known as "Land of Hope and Glory". In 1902 the tune was re-used, in modified form, for the "Land of Hope and Glory" section of his Coronation Ode for King Edward VII.

March No. 1 was the first piece in the recessional music for the coronations of George VI and Elizabeth II, followed in both cases by March No. 4.

Instrumental version commonly used in graduation ceremonies, recorded in 1931

In Canada, the Philippines, and the United States, the trio section "Land of Hope and Glory" of March No. 1 is often known simply as "Pomp and Circumstance" or as "The Graduation March" and is played as the processional tune at most high school and college graduation ceremonies. It was first played at such a ceremony on 28 June 1905, at Yale University, where the Professor of Music, Samuel Sanford, had invited his friend Elgar to attend commencement and receive an honorary doctorate of music. Elgar repaid the compliment by dedicating his Introduction and Allegro to Sanford later that year.

==== Description ====
March No. 1 opens with an introduction marked Allegro, con molto fuoco (Lively, with much fire). (Note: This is played by the full orchestra. Unconventionally, the music starts on the second half of the second beat of each bar, accented, in a key (remote from the march's home key of D) which resembles a favourite military band key of B♭ but found to be in the Lydian mode on E♭, the same little motif proceeding down in the bass and up in the treble voices half a bar later, all punctuated by chords on the second beats.) The introduction leads to a new theme: strong pairs of beats alternating with short notes, and a bass which persistently clashes with the tune. The bass tuba and full brass are held back until the section is repeated by the full orchestra. A little rhythmic pattern is played by the strings, then repeated high and low in the orchestra before the section is concluded by a chromatic upward scale from the woodwind. The whole of this lively march section is repeated. The bridging section between this and the well-known trio has rhythmic chords from the brass punctuating high held notes from the wind and strings, before a fanfare from trumpets and trombones leads into the theme with which the march started. There are a few single notes that quieten, ending with a single quiet tap from side drum and cymbal accompanied by all the bassoons. The lyrical "Land of Hope and Glory" trio follows (in the subdominant key of G), played softly (by the first violins, four horns and two clarinets) and repeated by the full orchestra including two harps. What follows is a repetition of what has been heard before, including a fuller statement of the trio (this time in the 'home' key of D) in which the orchestra is joined by organ as well as the two harps. The march ends, not with the big tune, but with a short section containing a brief reminder of the brisk opening march.

=== March No. 2 in A minor ===
The old Philharmonic Hall, Liverpool where the first two of the marches were premiered

==== Dedication ====
March No. 2 was composed in 1901 and dedicated "To my friend Granville Bantock". Bantock was Elgar's successor as professor of music at the University of Birmingham later in the decade.

==== Instrumentation ====
The instrumentation is: piccolo, 2 flutes, 2 oboes, 2 clarinets in A, bass clarinet in A, 2 bassoons, contrabassoon, 4 horns in F, 2 trumpets in F, 2 cornets in A, 3 trombones, tuba, timpani, percussion 2 side drums (the second is ad. lib.), triangle, glockenspiel, jingles, bass drum & cymbals, and strings.

==== History ====
It was first performed, as was March No. 1, by the Liverpool Orchestral Society at the Philharmonic Hall, Liverpool on 19 October 1901. Both marches were played two days later at a London promenade concert.

==== Description ====
The second is the most simply constructed of the marches and the shortest. (Note: In his 1977 recording with the London Philharmonic Orchestra for EMI Sir Adrian Boult takes less than three minutes to play it. Other conductors have taken the march less briskly.) After a loud call to attention from the brass, a simple staccato theme, tense and repetitive, is played quietly by the strings, being gradually joined by other instruments before building up to an abrupt climax. This section is repeated. The second theme, played by horns and clarinets, with contrasting triple and duple rhythms, is one that was sketched by Elgar a few years earlier: it is developed and ends with flourishes from the strings and brass joined by the glockenspiel. The opening staccato theme returns, concluded by a quiet swirling bass passage, which leads into the trio section (in the tonic major key of A) which consists of a simple tune in thirds played by the woodwind answered by the strings and brass. This section is repeated, and the march concludes with a short coda, which includes a roll on the snare drum, a loud chord in A Minor, briefly played by horns, and a final cadence.

=== March No. 3 in C minor ===
==== Dedication ====
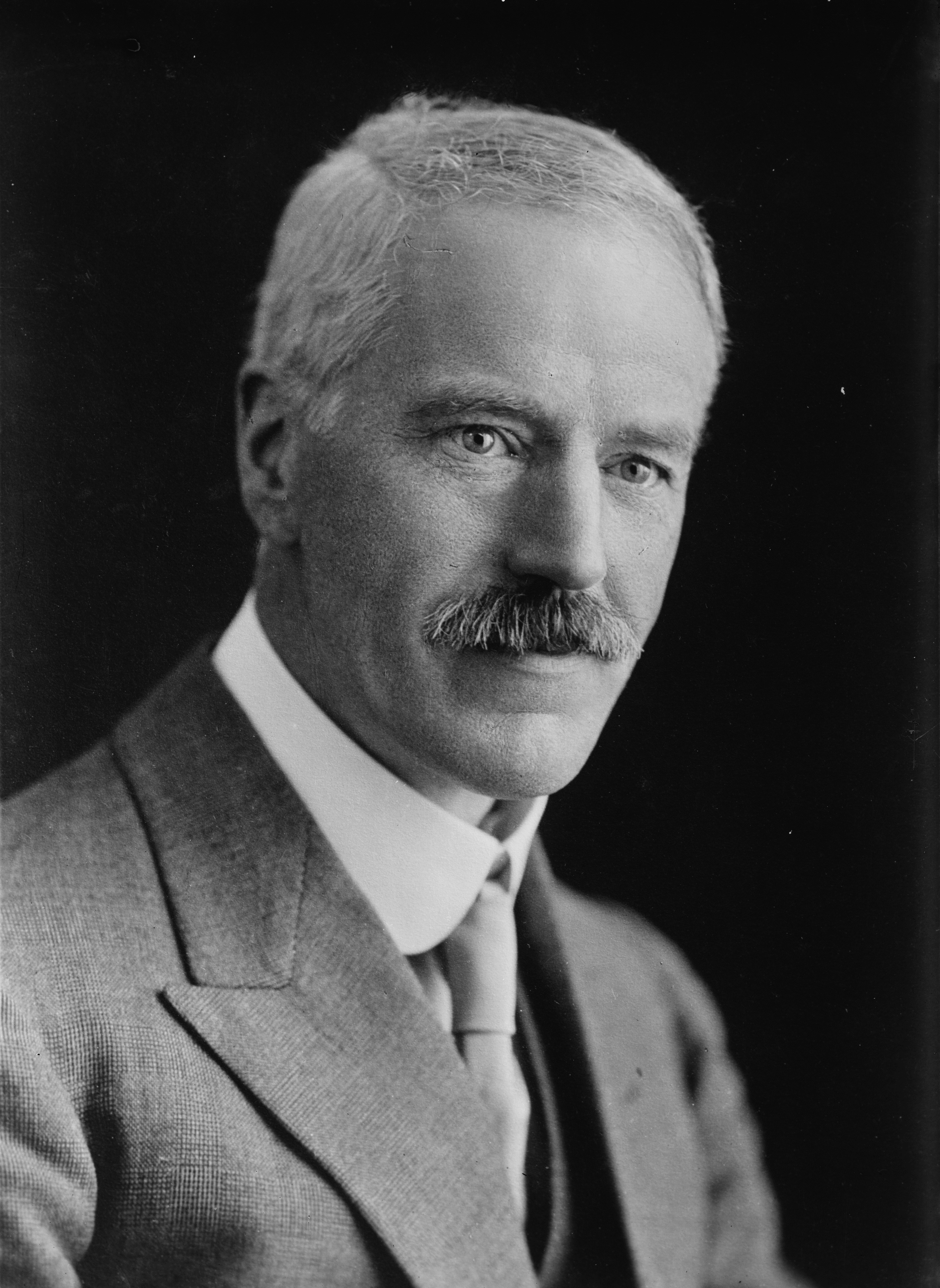
Ivor Atkins, dedicatee of the third march

March No. 3 was completed in November 1904 and published in 1905. It was dedicated "To my friend Ivor Atkins". It was first performed on 8 March 1905, in the Queen's Hall, London, conducted by the composer.

==== Instrumentation ====
The instrumentation is: piccolo, 2 flutes, 2 oboes, cor anglais, 2 clarinets in B♭, bass clarinet in B♭, 3 bassoons, (Note: The instrumentation is unusual in having three bassoons instead of the usual two, and Elgar directs in the full score that "the tone of the fagotti must be allowed to preponderate...") contrabassoon, 4 horns in F, 2 trumpets in B♭, 2 cornets in B♭, 3 trombones, tuba, timpani (3), percussion (tenor drum, side drum, bass drum & cymbals), and strings.

==== Description ====
March No. 3 differs from the others in its opening mood, which is solemn and described by Michael Kennedy as "slightly sinister". It begins with a dark subdued quick march led by low clarinets, three bassoons and the horns (with drum-beats inserted between the notes of the tune), before a vigorous theme (with brass alone at the first beats), erupts from the full orchestra. The dark theme re-appears, is then restarted boldly, and then ended abruptly. The central section commences with a lively tune played by a solo clarinet with simple string accompaniment, which is followed by another of Elgar's noble tunes played by the strings of the orchestra. All the themes re-appear and there is the final section which ends abruptly.

=== March No. 4 in G ===
March No. 4 is as upbeat and ceremonial as No. 1, containing another big tune in the central trio section.

==== Dedication ====
G. Robertson Sinclair, to whom the fourth march is dedicated

March No. 4 was completed on 7 June 1907, and dedicated "To my friend Dr G. Robertson Sinclair, Hereford". Sinclair was then the organist of Hereford Cathedral and "G.R.S." of the Enigma Variations, Variation XI. The march was first performed on 24 August 1907, in the Queen's Hall, London, conducted by the composer.

==== Instrumentation ====
The instrumentation is: piccolo (with 3rd flute), 2 flutes, 2 oboes, cor anglais, 2 clarinets in B♭, bass clarinet in B♭, 2 bassoons, contrabassoon, 4 horns in F, 3 trumpets in A, 3 trombones, tuba, timpani (3), percussion (side drum, bass drum & cymbals), 2 harps, and strings.

==== History ====
The trio was used by Elgar in a song called "The King's Way" which he wrote, to his wife's words, in celebration of the opening of an important new London street called Kingsway in 1909. During the Second World War, No. 4 followed No. 1 in acquiring words: a patriotic poem by A. P. Herbert with the refrain beginning "All men must be free" was used as "Song of Liberty".

During the wedding of Prince Charles and Lady Diana Spencer on 29 July 1981, Pomp and Circumstance No. 4 served as the recessional. It was the first piece in the recessional music for the coronation of Charles III on 6 May 2023.

==== Description ====
The march has an opening section consisting mainly of two-bar rhythmic phrases which are repeated in various forms, and a lyrical trio constructed like the "Land of Hope and Glory" trio of March No. 1. The first eight bars of the march are played by the full orchestra with the melody played by the violas. Both harps play from the beginning, while the cellos, double basses and timpani contribute a simple bass figure. The bass clarinet, contrabassoon, trombones and tuba are held "in reserve" for the repeat, when the first violins join the violas with the tune. There are subdued fanfares from the brass interrupted by little flourishes from the strings before the opening march is repeated. There is a pause and then a little section which starts forcefully but quietens, leading into the trio. The trio follows the pattern of March No. 1, with the melody (in the subdominant key of C) played by clarinet, horn and violins. The violins start the trio tune on the lowest note they can play, an open G-string, and they are directed to play the passage sul G on the same string, for the sake of the tone-colour, and the accompaniment is from the harps, low strings and bassoons. The big tune is repeated by the full orchestra; the opening march section returns; the grand tune is repeated once more, in the home key of G major; and the last word is had by a re-statement of the opening rhythmic patterns. The march prepares the audience for its end as surely as a train pulling into a station, with the violins, violas, and cellos ending on a resonant open G.

=== March No. 5 in C ===
==== Dedication ====
March No. 5 was composed in 1930, and dedicated "To my friend Dr. Percy C. Hull, Hereford". Its first public performance was on 20 September 1930 in a Queen's Hall concert conducted by Sir Henry Wood, although it had been recorded two days earlier in the Kingsway Hall, London, conducted by Elgar himself in spite of his poor health.

==== Instrumentation ====
The instrumentation is: piccolo, 2 flutes, 2 oboes, cor anglais, 2 clarinets in B♭, bass clarinet in B♭, 2 bassoons, contrabassoon, 4 horns in F, 3 trumpets in B♭, 3 trombones, tuba, timpani (3), percussion (side drum, bass drum & cymbals), and strings.

==== Description ====
Without introduction, the opening episode proceeds directly into the trio section. The trio starts quietly in a similar way to the introduction of Elgar's First Symphony: just a moving bass line and a tune, also in the same key (A♭). The tune is re-stated strongly and then developed. The re-statement of the opening employs the same instruments of the orchestra, but is this time started as softly as possible for just four bars before a quick crescendo. There is more development before a large-scale return of the trio theme, in the home key of C, and a jubilant ending.

=== March No. 6 in G minor ===
==== History ====
Elgar left sketches for a sixth Pomp and Circumstance march, to be the final work in the set.

==== Version orchestrated by Percy M. Young ====
In 1956 Boosey & Hawkes published a Military March No. 6 in the key of B♭ major, arranged and orchestrated by Percy M. Young. Certain manuscripts were made available to Young from the estate of the Grafton family (of Elgar's niece May Grafton), including a short score dated March 1924 and separate violin and cello parts. Elgar indicated details of orchestration and expression. From these sources Young orchestrated 117 bars for full orchestra. However, it appears to be substantially the Empire March composed for the British Empire Exhibition of 1924, including the trio section A Song of Union.

==== Version completed by Anthony Payne ====
In 2005 Elgar's sketches were sent by the lawyer for the Elgar Will Trust to the English composer Anthony Payne, who had earlier reconstructed the Third Symphony from Elgar's sketches. Also included was an article titled "Circumstantial Evidence" by the Elgar authority Christopher Kent from the August 1997 Musical Times explaining the sketches. One idea in the sketches was marked by the composer "jolly good", but Kent believed that Elgar's compositional thoughts and time were by then engaged with the Third Symphony and The Spanish Lady, and that the main theme for the march was "unpromising". Payne felt there was not enough in the sketches to complete the march, but three pages of score in Elgar's handwriting were discovered at the Royal School of Church Music Colles Library marked "P&C 6". In 2006, the score and sketches were turned into a performing version. Payne observed in his programme notes that "Nowhere else in the Pomp and Circumstance marches does Elgar combine compound and duple metres in this way". Payne concluded the piece with a brief allusion to the first Pomp and Circumstance March. The world premiere of Payne's version was on 2 August 2006 with Sir Andrew Davis conducting the BBC Symphony Orchestra at the BBC Proms in the Royal Albert Hall. The first commercial recording was by the BBC National Orchestra of Wales under Richard Hickox.

==== Instrumentation ====
The instrumentation of the Payne version is: piccolo, 2 flutes, 2 oboes, cor anglais, 2 clarinets in B♭, bass clarinet in B♭, 2 bassoons, contrabassoon, 4 horns in F, 3 trumpets in B♭, 3 trombones, tuba, timpani (4), percussion (side drum, cymbals, bass drum, jingles, glockenspiel), and strings with octobass.

== Critical reception ==
Even when Elgar's music was out of fashion in the 1950s, the music critics Edward Sackville-West and Desmond Shawe-Taylor called the five marches "stirring" and praised them as "admirable in their kind". More recently, in The Cambridge Companion to Elgar (2011) Julian Rushton comments that the first of the five marches is "relatively over-exposed", but follows the traditional structure for such works ("despite an off-key beginning") but like the other four marches it is not intended for military use: "an elaborate 'portrait' of the march designed for a large concert hall ... such as the Royal Albert Hall where it is annually deployed at the Last Night of the Proms".

Rushton judges the fourth march to have a trio melody "hardly inferior to 'Land of Hope and Glory'", but adds that "more subversively, Nos. 2 and 3 are in minor keys, with a modal tendency (flattened sevenths), and No. 2 offers hints of tonal ambiguity". Rushton concludes that despite the title of the set, the point of the five marches is not pomp and circumstance, "at least if that implies jingo and Empire".

The musicologist Brian Trowell wrote in 1993:

We are so used to Elgar’s marches that we regard their nationalistic idiom as equivalent to that of Dvořák's Slavonic Dances, but they are not so innocent. If we put their glittering orchestral equipage and sheer catchiness to one side for the moment, we realize that they are really a kind of recruitment propaganda.

The historian Bernard Porter takes a different position, rejecting any depiction of the Elgar of the marches as "a jingoistic tub-thumper, a manifestation of the worst aspects of late Victorian and Edwardian bombast". The Elgar scholar Daniel M. Grimley has commented that it is "especially difficult to listen to the Pomp and Circumstance marches with neutral ears given this highly polarized reception history".

March No. 1

March No. 2

March No. 4
All performed by the United States Army Band

== Arrangements ==
- For piano solo: The first four marches were arranged by Adolf Schmid and March No. 5 by Victor Hely-Hutchinson.
- For brass band: March No. 1 was arranged (transposed to B♭) by J. Ord Hume.

== Recordings ==
The first recordings – Marches 1 and 2 only – were made in July 1914, shortly before the outbreak of the First World War. They were issued by His Master's Voice (HMV), with the first march playing at 79 r.p.m. and the second at 80 r.p.m. The composer conducted an unidentified "Symphony Orchestra". After electrical recording came in during the 1920s HMV made new recordings conducted by Elgar, the first two marches with the Royal Albert Hall Orchestra and the other three with the London Symphony Orchestra.

Later recordings of the full set of the five original marches include:

Conductor	Orchestra	Year	Ref
Sir Adrian Boult	London Philharmonic	1955	
Sir Arthur Bliss	London Symphony	1958	
Sir John Barbirolli	Philharmonia/New Philharmonia	1966 (Note: Marches 1 and 4 were recorded in 1962)	
Daniel Barenboim	London Philharmonic	1974	
Norman Del Mar	Royal Philharmonic	1975	
Sir Adrian Boult	London Philharmonic	1977	
Sir Georg Solti	London Philharmonic	1977	
Alexander Gibson	Scottish National	1978	
Vernon Handley	London Philharmonic	1981	
Andrew Davis	Philharmonia	1982	
André Previn	Royal Philharmonic	1985	
Barry Tuckwell	London Symphony	1988	
Vladimir Ashkenazy	Sydney Symphony	2009	
Sir Andrew Davis	BBC Philharmonic	2011	
Sir Mark Elder	Hallé	2015	

== Notes, references and sources ==
=== Sources ===
- Elgar, Edward (1930). Pomp and Circumstance March No 5. London: Boosey and Hawkes. OCLC 1123998670.
- Elgar, Edward (1992). Enigma Variations and Pomp and Circumstance Marches. New York: Dover. ISBN 0-48-627342-3.
- Grimley, Daniel M. (2007). "The Spirit-Stirring Drum: Elgar and Populism". In Byron Adams (ed.). Edward Elgar and His World. Princeton and Oxford: Princeton University Press. ISBN 978-0-691-13445-1.
- Kennedy, Michael (1970). Elgar: Orchestral Music. London: BBC. OCLC 252020259.
- Maine, Basil (1933). Edward Elgar: His Life and Works. Vol. 2: Works. London: George Bell & Sons. OCLC 3377687.
- McCoy, Deborah (2001). The World's Most Unforgettable Weddings. London: Kensington. ISBN 0-80-652185-6.
- McVeagh, Diana (2007). Elgar the Music Maker. Woodbridge, Suffolk: Boydell Press. ISBN 978-1-84383-295-9.
- Moore, Jerrold Northrop (1984). Edward Elgar: A Creative Life. Oxford: Oxford University Press. ISBN 0-19-315447-1.
- Reed, W. H. (1946). Elgar. London: Dent. OCLC 8858707.
- Rushton, Julian (2011). "In Search of the Symphony: Orchestral Music to 1908". The Cambridge Companion to Elgar. Cambridge: Cambridge University. ISBN 978-1-13-900225-7.
- Rust, Brian, ed. (1975). Gramophone Records of the First World War: An HMV Catalogue 1914–18. Newton Abbot: David & Charles. ISBN 0-7153-6842-7.
- Sackville-West, Edward; Desmond Shawe-Taylor (1955). The Record Guide. London: Collins. OCLC 500373060.
- Wood, Henry (1938). My Life of Music. London: Gollancz. OCLC 2600343.
- Young, Percy M. (1973). Elgar O. M.: A Study of a Musician. London: Collins. OCLC 869820.
