= Percy Hull =

English organist and composer

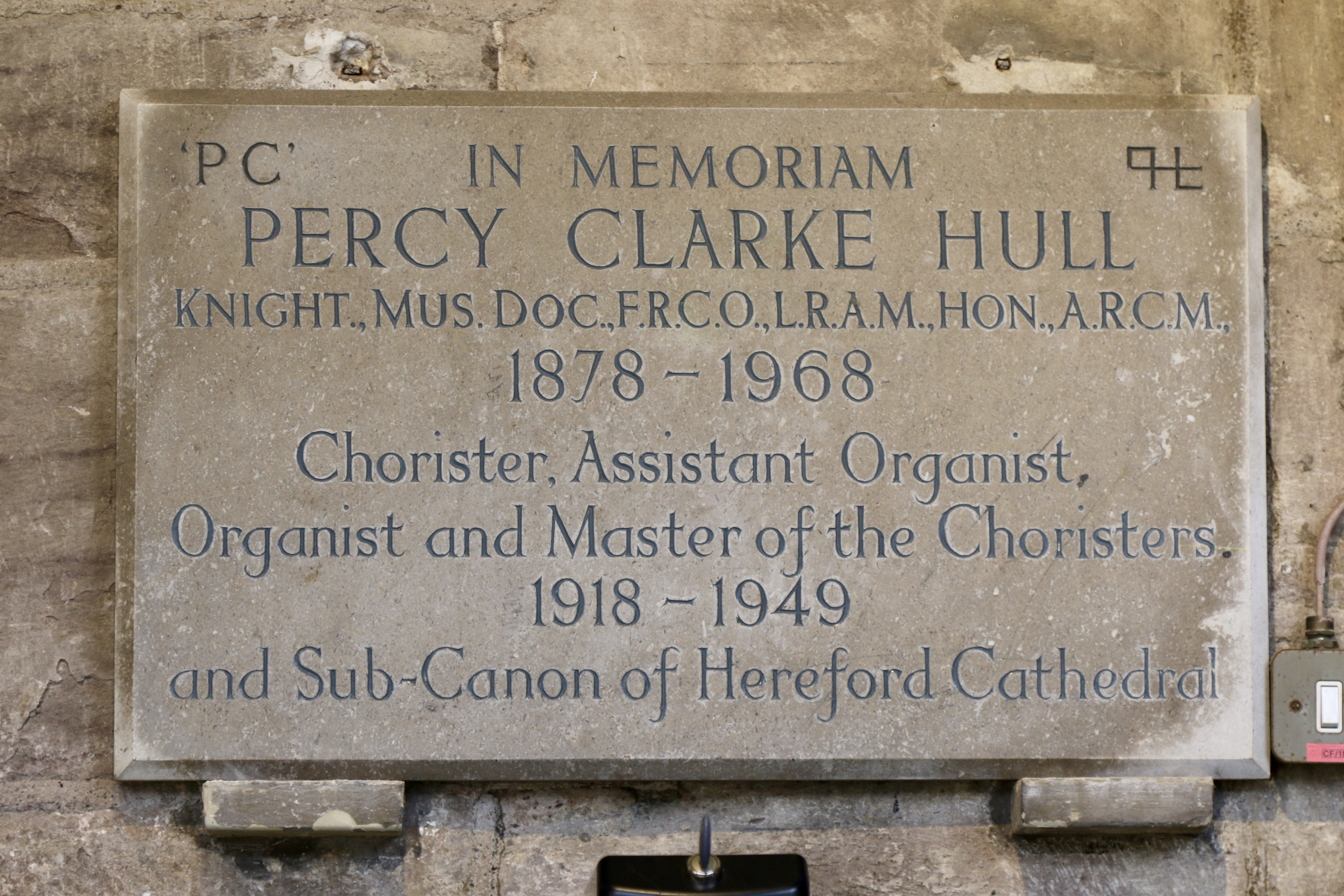
Memorial in the cloister at Hereford Cathedral

Sir Percy Clarke Hull (27 October 1878 in Hereford, England – 31 August 1968 in Farnham Surrey) was an English organist and composer who revived the Three Choirs Festival during his time as organist of Hereford Cathedral from 1918 to 1949. A friend of Edward Elgar (who dedicated the fifth of his Pomp and Circumstance Marches to him) and Ralph Vaughan Williams, he was involved in the first performance of Vaughan Williams' Two Hymn Preludes and Prelude and Fugue in C minor for Orchestra.

Hull was a chorister at Hereford Cathedral under Langdon Colborne and George Robertson Sinclair.

He was afterwards a pupil of Dr Sinclair and assistant organist of Hereford Cathedral from 1896-1914. He was in Germany at the outbreak of the Great War and interned as a civil prisoner of war at Ruhleben. He was appointed organist of Hereford Cathedral on Armistice Day 1918.

He was knighted in 1947 for his services to music and his work in the revival of the Three Choirs Festival after World War II.

From 1951 to 1955 he was conductor of the Reigate and Redhill Choral Society in Surrey.

Cultural offices
Preceded by George Robertson Sinclair	Organist and Master of the Choristers of Hereford Cathedral; 1918–1950	Succeeded by Meredith Davies
