= Camidge family =

The Camidge family supplied York Minster with organists for 103 years. Its members were:

- John Camidge (1735–1803, in office 1756–1799)
- John's son Matthew Camidge (1764–1844, in office 1799–1842), as well as some psalm chants still in the Anglican repertoire, Matthew wrote "Six Concertos for the Organ or grand Piano Forte"
- Matthew's son Dr John Camidge II (1790–1859, in office 1842–59)
- John's son Thomas Simpson Camidge (1828–1913)
- Thomas's son John Henry Norrison Camidge (1853–1939)
- William Camidge, the son of John Camidge II, wrote a biography of William Etty.

== Individual members ==
John Camidge 1 (bap. 1734–1803) was a composer and organist of York Minster from 1756. He gave Matthew, the sixth son, his early musical training.

John Camidge 2 (York 1790 – York 21 September 1859) was the grandson of JC1, and also organist of York Minster (1842–1848). He suffered a paralytic stroke while playing the organ in 1848 and never played again. Like his father and his grandfather, he is best known as a composer of chants. JC2 had one daughter and three sons, Charles, John, and Thomas Simpson (1828–1912). John and Thomas Simpson followed their father's profession. The latter, having acted as his father's deputy following his paralysis, went on to become organist of Hexham Abbey. His elder brother John briefly took over the post at York until Edwin George Monk was appointed in 1859. John Henry Norrison Camidge (1853–1939), a son of Thomas Simpson Camidge, was organist of Beverley Minster from 1876 until his death—the fifth generation in which the family produced an organist.

Matthew Camidge (25 May 1764 – 23 October 1844 in York) was a well-known local musician in Northern England, famous for his organ playing and conducting oratorios. His compositions are solid in craftsmanship though quite conservative.

He was the son of JC1 and Elizabeth Camidge, and the father of JC2.

After some time as a chorister of the Chapel Royal under James Nares, Matthew returned to York where he lived the rest of his life. He served as his father's assistant and in 1799 he succeeded his father as organist of York Minster. He played an active part in the musical life of York, appearing as a soloist in piano and organ concertos and promoting music festivals in York Minster. After Matthew retired in 1842, his son, JC2, succeeded him as organist.

Matthew married Mary Shaw of York in 1789. They had three sons. One, John, succeeded Matthew on his own retirement, and then passed on the post to his own son. Matthew's other sons took orders, and one of them became canon of York Minster.

Matthew Camidge was known for his brilliant organ improvisations. He organized huge music festivals given at York in 1823, 1825, and later. As a violinist, he led the orchestra of the York Musical Society. He contributed 30 excellent hymn tunes for William Richardson's Collection of Psalms, which in later editions became widely known as The York Psalm and Hymn Book. It is likely that Camidge introduced the practice of psalm chanting to St Michael-le-Belfrey, his other church job, which he obtained in 1801.

"His sonatas, for piano with accompanying violin and cello, are very pleasant works, and representative of the better English music of the time, though not original. He frankly acknowledged, in the preface to his set of organ concertos published in 1817, that he was writing them in the "so long admired" style of Handel and Corelli." ~ Joseph Stevenson, All Music Guide

Matthew Camidge published works of practical material written for his work as a church musician and teacher as well as anthems and service settings in Cathedral Music, Hymn and psalm tunes, an edition of Henry Lawes' Psalmody for a single voice, Instructions for the Piano forte or Harpsichord and some songs.

== Publications ==
- Matthew Camidge (c.1815) "Six Concertos for the Organ or grand Piano Forte composed and dedicated with greatest Respect to his much esteemed friend William Shield Esqr. by Matthew Camidge. Op. 13 Pr. 8/- N.B. the Author in this Work has Endeavoured to imitate the particular Style of Music which has been so long Admired namely that of Handel and Corelli, this Acknowledgement will he hopes secure him from the Critics Censure....."
- Talk by Dr. David Griffiths: The Camidges of York: Five generations of a musical family
