= Mark James Monk =

Mark James Monk (1858–1929) was a cathedral organist, who served at Truro Cathedral and elsewhere. He was also a composer.

== Background ==
Monk was born on 16 March 1858 in Hunmanby Yorkshire. He studied organ under Edwin George Monk at York Minster. He was a composer of sacred and secular music including Elegiac Odes, a Festival Te Deum, Quintet for wind, and piano and organ pieces. He had a hymn included in Hymns Ancient and Modern He died 5 May 1929 at Blackheath.

== Career ==
Assistant organist of:

- York Minster ???? - 1879

Organist of:

- St. John's Church, Ladywood, Birmingham 1879 - 1880
- St Helen's Church, Ashby-de-la-Zouch 1880 - 1883
- Banbury Parish Church 1883 - 1890
- Truro Cathedral 1890 - 1920

Cultural offices
Preceded by George Robertson Sinclair	Organist and Master of the Choristers of Truro Cathedral; 1890–1920	Succeeded by Hubert Stanley Middleton
