= Beverley Minster =

Church in the East Riding of Yorkshire, England

- Parish Church of Saint John and Saint Martin
- Beverley Minster
- 53°50′21″N 0°25′29″W
- OS grid reference: TA 03766 39257
- Country: England
- Denomination: Church of England
- Previous denomination: Roman Catholic
- Churchmanship: Broad Church
- Website: beverleyminster.org.uk

History
- Former name: The Church of St John of Beverley
- Dedication: St John and St Martin

Architecture
- Architectural type: Church
- Style: English Gothic
- Years built: 1188–1420

Administration
- Province: Province of York
- Diocese: Diocese of York

Clergy
- Vicar: Jonathan Baker

Beverley Minster, otherwise known as the Parish Church of Saint John and Saint Martin, in Beverley, East Riding of Yorkshire, is a parish church in the Church of England. It is one of the largest parish churches in the UK, larger than one-third of all English cathedrals and is regarded as a Gothic masterpiece.

Originally a collegiate church, it was not selected as a bishop's seat during the Dissolution of the Monasteries; nevertheless, it survived as a parish church and the chapter house and the attached church of St Martin were the only major parts of the building to be lost. It is part of the Major Churches Network and a Grade I listed building.

== History ==
The minster owes its origin and much of its subsequent importance to Saint John of Beverley, Bishop of York (706–714?), who founded a monastery locally c. 700 and whose remains still lie in a vault beneath the nave. Archaeological excavations in 1979–82 confirmed that a major church stood on or near the present minster site from c. 700 to c. 850. That last date could support a tradition of the sacking of the monastery by Vikings.

Another tradition attributes to King Æthelstan the refoundation of the monastery as a collegiate church of secular canons. The establishment of a major minster and its privileges was more likely a gradual process but, by the early 11th century, Bishop John's tomb had become a major pilgrimage centre. He was canonised in 1037, and his cult encouraged the growth of a town around the minster. The archbishops of York, the lords of Beverley throughout the Middle Ages, secured grants for four annual fairs which enhanced the town's trading role. From the 12th century Beverley was a major exporter of wool to the Low Countries.

A 12th-century charter indicates substantial rebuilding work following the canonisation of St John of Beverley in 1037. Cynesige (Archbishop 1051–60) added a high stone tower; his successor Ealdred (1060–69) expanded the church with a new presbytery. He also installed a painted and gilded ceiling from the presbytery to the tower. Nothing remains of this Anglo-Saxon church, and no records of building work under the Normans survive. However, large quantities of Norman masonry have been found in excavations throughout the town, and four large arches built behind the nave triforium during the 14th century are composed of reused Norman voussoirs (wedge-shaped stones).

In 1067/68 Gamel, Sheriff of York was informed in a writ by William the Conqueror that Archbishop Ealdred should draw up a privilegium for the lands belonging to the church of St John of Beverley and that they shall be free from the demands of the king, his reeves, and all his men, except for those of the archbishop and priests of the church.

Saint Thomas Becket of Canterbury (December 1119 or 20 – December 1170) was named Provost of Beverley in 1154.

=== Rebuilding ===
A fire in 1188 seriously damaged the minster and the town. Much of the church was damaged and complete rebuilding was required. Money was collected for the work and reconstruction began at the east end soon after the fire. During the construction, a new lantern tower over the eastern crossing designed to illuminate the shrine of St John was under construction, but it collapsed c. 1219 necessitating a partial rebuild of the church. Henry III granted 40 oaks from Sherwood Forest in 1252, and by c. 1260 the retrochoir, choir, chapter house, transepts, and crossing were complete. Filled with light, overwhelmingly tall and spacious, and speaking to the increasing skills of the stonecarvers, this new work was radically different from the old Saxon and Norman structure it replaced. It was the product of the novel structural systems and artistic development that together define the Gothic style, originating in France and brought to England in the late 12th century. Work did not progress beyond the first bay of the nave. Of this Early English Gothic building campaign, only the chapter house has been lost, although its arcaded staircase survives in the north choir aisle.

The Perpendicular Gothic West front of Beverley Minster

A new shrine for St John was ordered from Roger de Faringdon of London in 1292, to which the saint's remains were translated on 25 October 1307. Collections for further rebuilding were resumed in 1308, and work on the nave had begun by 1311. The architectural style current in England had developed into something much different from the Early Gothic displayed in the first part of the rebuilding; the new style is referred to as Decorated. More structurally daring, more richly decorated forms merge with the earlier, simpler forms in the nave of Beverley Minster, in an effort both to respect the older work and to bring it up to date. Building on the nave was ongoing in 1334, and may have been halted by the Black Death in 1348 as in many other instances across England.

Work did not resume until later in the century, when the nave was completed and the west front with its two towers was built, c. 1400. These towers are a superlative example of the Perpendicular style. By the early 15th century, with the building of the north porch, the Minster was structurally complete. The great east window (bequeathed in 1416), a chapel funded by the Percys (c. 1490, in the extreme northeast corner of the church), and the choir stalls (c. 1520) were the only major later work.

Henry Percy, 4th Earl of Northumberland (1449–1489), was buried in the church after being murdered by his own retainers at Cockslodge near Thirsk, in 1489 during the Yorkshire rebellion over high taxes imposed by King Henry VII.

=== English Reformation and beyond ===
In 1548, the minster was reduced to the status of a parish church, the college of secular canons established before the Norman Conquest was dissolved (decreasing the minster's staff from at least seventy-five to four), and the shrine of St John was dismantled. The chapter house, now unused, was demolished. By the early 17th century the parish church of St Martin, formerly attached to the three southwestern bays of the nave, was also gone.

As with many English churches during the wars of religion in the 16th century, Beverley Minster was not immune to dissension. Church authorities cracked down hard on those they felt were part of the "Popish" conspiracy contrary to royal decrees. "Among those holding traditional beliefs were three of the clergy at the minster, who were charged with Popish practices in 1567; John Levet was a former member of the college and Richard Levet was presumably his brother. Both Levets were suspended from the priesthood for keeping prohibited equipment and books and when restored were ordered not to minister in Beverley or its neighbourhood."

By the early 18th century the church was in a state of decay. The stone vaulting used in all areas of the Minster called for flying buttresses, which had been constructed everywhere except on the north transept. By 1700, progressive structural failure of this transept over the centuries had almost brought about its collapse, with the transept gable overhanging the base by 4 ft (1.2 m). Restoration continued from 1717 to 1731 under Nicholas Hawksmoor. William Thornton of York, one of the supervisors of the project, devised an ingenious method of levering the wall back into place and securing it with a great wooden frame. The southwestern bays of the nave, where the north wall of St Martin's parish church had been, were reconstructed at this time as well to harmonise with the rest of the nave.

== Features ==
Features of the interior include shafts of Purbeck Marble, stiff-leaf carving and the tomb of Lady Eleanor Percy, dating from around 1340 and covered with a richly decorated canopy, regarded by F. H. Crossley as one of the best surviving examples of Gothic art. A total of 68 16th-century misericords are located in the quire of the minster, and nearby is a sanctuary or frith stool dating back to Anglo-Saxon times.

The misericords were probably carved by the so-called "Ripon school" of carvers and bear a strong family resemblance to those at Manchester Cathedral and Ripon Cathedral.

The church contains one of the few remaining frith stools (also known as frid stools, meaning "peace chairs") in England. Anyone wanting to claim sanctuary from the law would sit in the chair. The chair dates from Saxon times before 1066.

In the central tower is a massive treadwheel crane, which was used to lift building materials to the roof space. It is of medieval origin but has been largely reconstructed.

The organ is mounted above a richly carved wooden screen dating from 1877 to 1880, designed by Sir George Gilbert Scott, and carved by James Elwell of Beverley. There is a staircase in the north aisle which was used in collegiate times to gain access to the chapter house, since demolished.

Improvements to the choir were made during the 16th and 18th centuries, and medieval glass, which was shattered by a storm in 1608, was meticulously collected and installed in the east window in 1725. The Thornton family, great craftsmen of the early 18th century, were responsible for the font cover and the west door, and also for saving the church from being completely ruined by the fall of the north wall of the north transept between 1718 and 1731. Another notable feature is the series of carvings of musicians which adorn the nave, which date to the second quarter of the 14th century.

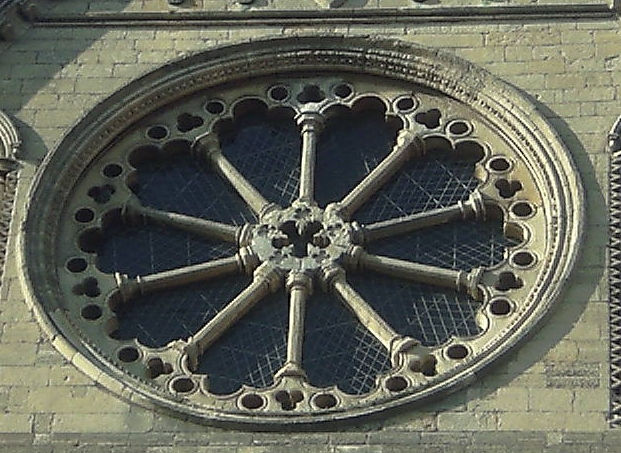
Rose window

Nave

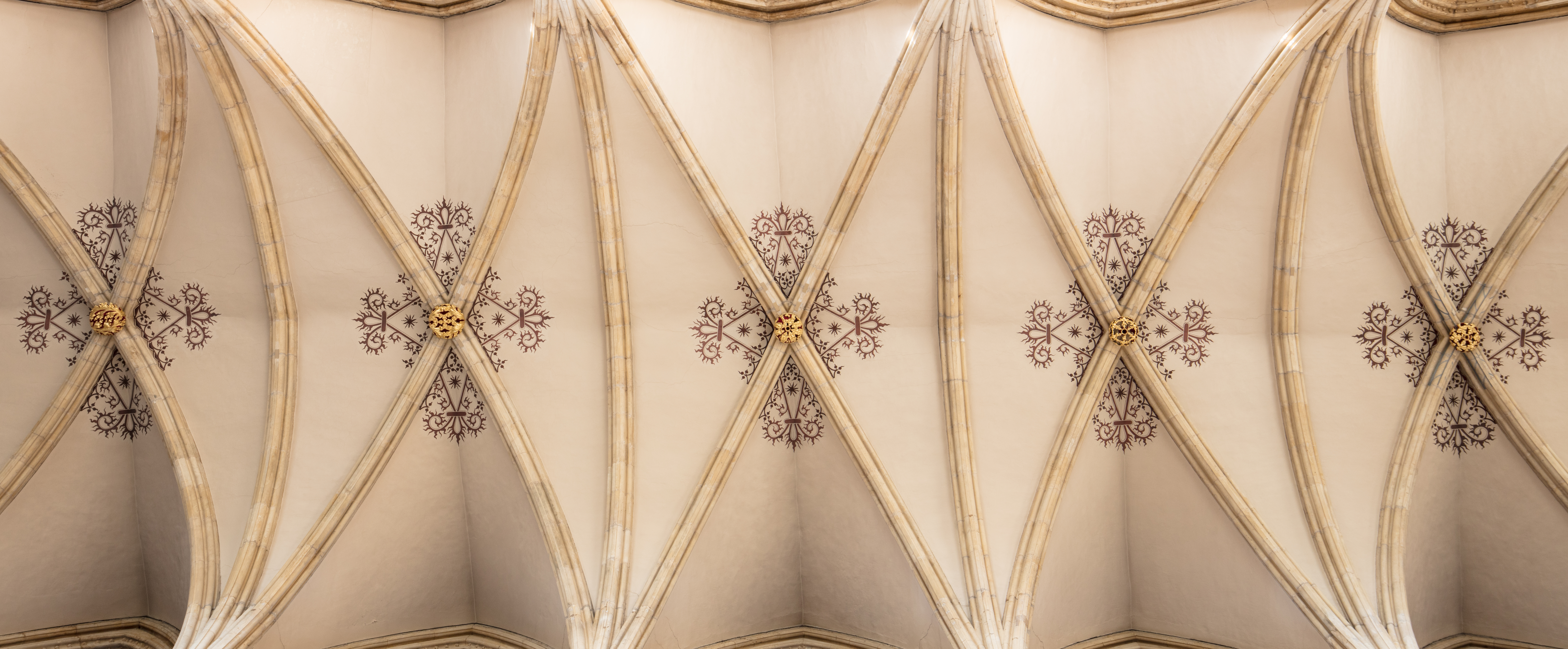
Nave vault

Choir

A misericord in the choir

Font

== Bells ==
Both west towers contain bells. The south-west tower contains a non-swinging bourdon bell called Great John. It chimes the hour and it dates from 1901. It weighs over 7 tons and it is over 7 feet in diameter. Despite its name, it is not dedicated to Saint John of Beverley. It reads, "I am called the great bell of Saint John the Evangelist 1901". Records show that the Minster possessed two bells in 1050. Four bells were installed in 1366, three of which having been recast and are still used in the Minster. The chimes for each quarter are rung on the 10 bells in the north-west tower and the melody was composed by organist John Camidge. There have been two major overhauls of the bells, one in 1896 and the other in 1901 by Taylor of Loughborough.

== Clock ==
A new clock was installed by John Smith and Sons of Derby and set going on 15 February 1902. It chimed the quarters on the peal of ten bells in the north-west tower, and the hour was struck on the great bell “John” in the south tower. The quarter chimes rang 12 notes at the first quarter, 20 at the second, 32 at the third and 41 before the hour strike. This makes Beverley Minister the only large ‘cathedral’ (a term used loosely) in the UK that uses clock bells housed in both of its west towers.

== Organ ==
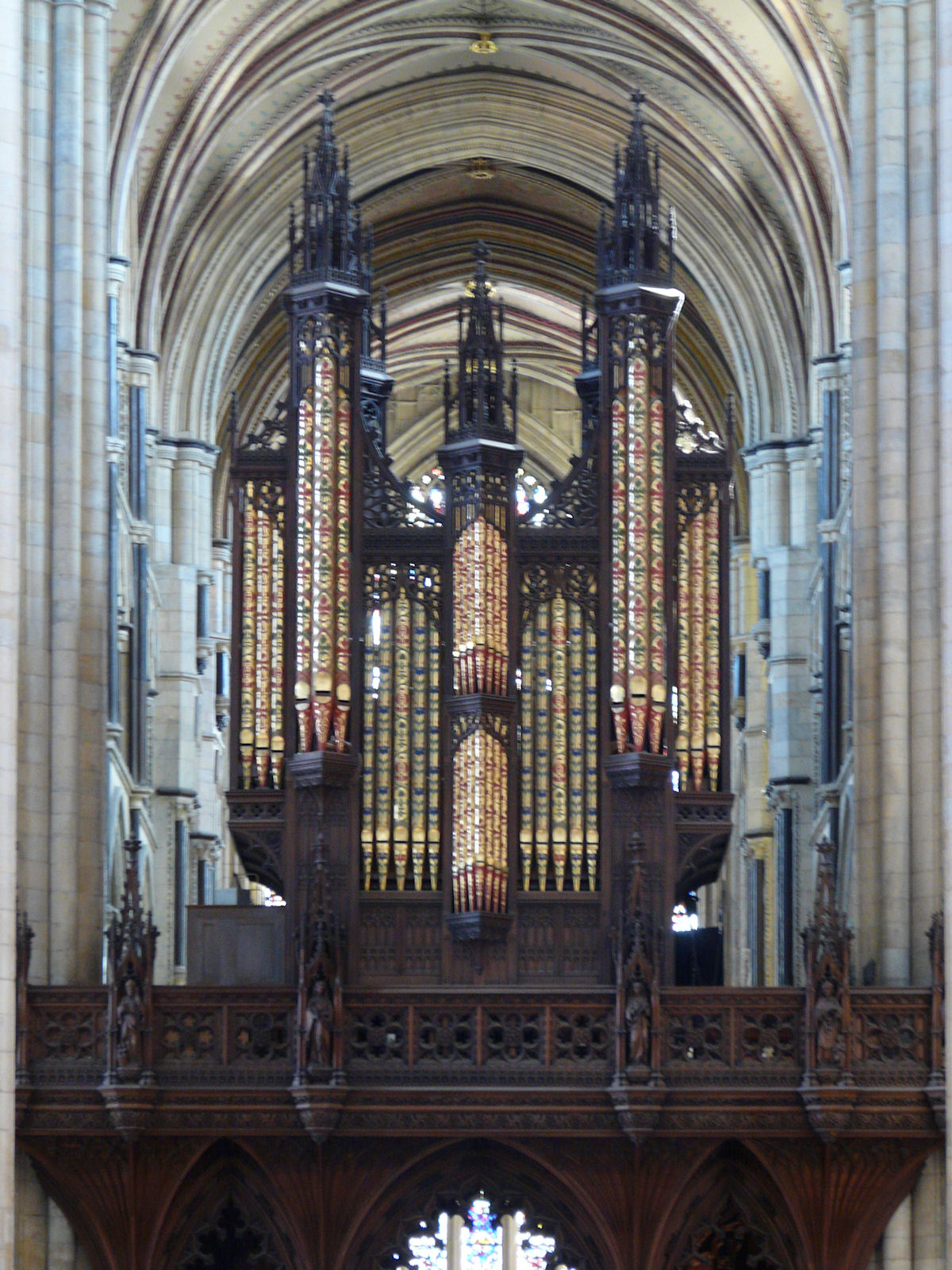
Snetzler organ case from 1769

There is a large, chestnut-coloured organ with bright golden pipes, designed by Arthur Hill in 1916. It houses an original manual from the organ built by John Snetzler in 1769, which has been increased to four manuals since. There have been subsequent rebuilds and restoration by William Hill & Sons in 1884, and by Hill, Norman and Beard in 1962–63. The specification of the organ can be found on the National Pipe Organ Register.

=== Organists ===
- Matthias Hawdon, 1769–76
- George Lambert, 1777–1818
- G. J. Lambert, 1818–74 (son of George Lambert)
- Langdon Colborne, 1874–75 (formerly organist of St Michael's College, Tenbury, afterwards organist of Wigan parish church)
- Arthur Henry Mann, 1875–76 (afterwards organist and director of music at King's College, Cambridge)
- John Henry Norrison Camidge, 1876–1933
- Herbert Kennedy Andrews, 1934–38
- John Herbert Long, 1938–56 (formerly organist of St Peter's Church, Brighton)
- David Ingate, 1957–1962 (also music teacher at Beverley Grammar School, and formerly organist at All Saints' Parish Church, High Wycombe)
- Peter Fletcher 1962–1966
- Alan Spedding, 1967–March 2009 (formerly organist of Kingston upon Thames parish church)
- Robert Poyser, 2009–present

=== Assistant organists ===
- Gordon Reynolds, 1939–42 (later organist of St Bride's Church, Fleet Street, London)
- Wallace Michael Ross, 1948–50
- Andrew Leach, 1960–1967 (Acting Organist, September 1966 – January 1967)
- Ian Sharp, 1967–1969
- Geoffrey Pearce, 1969–1973 (later Organist and Master of the Choristers at St Andrew's Cathedral, Aberdeen, Bridlington Priory and Selby Abbey)
- James Archer, 1973–1974
- Andrew Leach, 1974–1980
- John Long, 1980–1984
- Paul Dewhurst, 1987–1990
- Andrew Dibb, 1990–1993
- Simon Taranczuk, 1993–1996
- Colin Wright, 1996–2010
- Ian Seddon, 2013–2018 becoming Associate Organist in 2018

=== Organ scholars ===
- James Longden, from September 2011
- Dominic Joyce, from September 2016

== Burials ==
- John of Beverley (died 7 May 721)
- Eleanor FitzAlan, wife of Henry Percy, 1st Baron Percy, 1328
- Idonea de Clifford, wife of Henry Percy, 3rd Baron Percy, 1365
- Henry Percy, 4th Earl of Northumberland
- Maud Herbert, wife of 4th Earl of Northumberland, 1485/1495.
- Henry Percy, 5th Earl of Northumberland, 1527
- Catherine Spencer, wife of 5th Earl, 1542
- Oliver De Lancey, 1785

== Cultural depictions ==
=== In literature ===
Beverley Minster. is the subject of a poetical illustration by Letitia Elizabeth Landon to a picture by Nathaniel Whittock published in Fisher's Drawing Room Scrap Book, 1836.

=== In film and television ===
Location sequences for the film Lease of Life (1954), two TV series of Victoria in 2016-7, and the BBC dramas King Charles III and Gunpowder in 2017 were filmed in Beverley Minster.

== See also ==
- Provost of Beverley Minster
- Grade I listed churches in the East Riding of Yorkshire
- Listed buildings in Beverley (south area)
