= Hubert Stanley Middleton =

British musician (1890–1959)

Hubert Stanley Middleton (11 May 1890 – 13 August 1959) was a cathedral organist who served at Truro Cathedral and Ely Cathedral before taking up a long-standing organist and teaching appointment at Trinity College, Cambridge.

== Background ==
Middleton was born on 11 May 1890 in Windsor. His education began at the Imperial Service College where he first received organ lessons from Sir Walter Parratt, and then at the Royal Academy of Music. From there he went on to study for the history tripos at Peterhouse, Cambridge, taking his MA and Mus.B in 1920. From that year Middleton served as organist and conductor of the choir at Truro Cathedral (succeeding Mark James Monk), during which time he married Dorothy Mary Miller (on 7 January 1922).

While at Truro he established himself as a prominent West Country organist and choral conductor, giving many opening recitals on newly installed or rebuilt organs, including St Martin's Church, Liskeard on 20 June 1923 and St Gwinear’s Church, Gwinear on 14 January 1925. He maintained links with the region for some time, as in his conducting the Dorset Women's Choir of 600 Voices at the Dorset Music Festival in a performance of the cantata The Echoing Green by Christopher Le Fleming on 21 March 1939. From 1926 until 1931 he was organist and choirmaster at Ely Cathedral. He joined the teaching staff at the Royal Academy in 1928.

== Academic career ==
From 1931 Middleton was appointed organist and director of studies in music at Trinity College, Cambridge, taking over as organist from Alan Gray, and establishing his music rooms in the set formerly occupied by Sir James Frazer. He started lecturing in music at Trinity from 1938. After Edward Dent finished his tenure as professor of music at the University of Cambridge in 1941, no official successor was appointed for the rest of the war years.

Middleton took on the task of continuing Dent's reforms, designing the syllabus for the full tripos in music at Cambridge that came into effect in 1945. Its success influenced the University of Oxford to establish its own faculty and honours school of music.

Aside from a year in 1945-6 working for the British Education Section in Berlin, Middleton served at Trinity for 28 years until his death, aged 69. He became highly regarded as an influential teacher, and his students at Cambridge included James Clifford Brown, Mary Berry, David Barlow, Mervyn Horder, Gerald Hocken Knight, Raymond Leppard, William Mann, Bernard Rose and Stephen Wilkinson.

Middleton was also an occasional composer of church music. One work, the motet for unaccompanied double choir Let my prayer be set forth, published in 1928, is considered a technical tour de force, featuring the two choirs singing in canon at one bar's interval. Other works include Praise to the Holiest in the Height for double choir and organ (first sung at the Three Choirs Festival in 1930) and The West Wind for unison upper voices.

Cultural offices
Preceded by Mark James Monk	Organist and Master of the Choristers of Truro Cathedral; 1920–1926	Succeeded by John Dykes Bower
Preceded by Noel Ponsonby	Organist and Master of the Choristers of Ely Cathedral; 1926–1931	Succeeded by Marmaduke Conway
