= George Jackson Lambert =

English organist and composer

George Jackson Lambert (16 November 1794 – 24 January 1880) was an English organist and composer, for many years organist of Beverley Minster.

== Life ==
Lambert was born in Beverley, son of George Lambert, organist of Beverley Minster. He had his first lessons from his father; afterwards he studied in London under Samuel T. Lyon and William Crotch. He played violin, viola and cello; in his early career he played at the Chapel Royal and at St George's Chapel, Windsor Castle, and was said to be a favourite of the Prince Regent.

In 1818 he succeeded his father as organist at Beverley, and held the post until 1874, when ill health and deafness compelled him to retire. He died in Beverley on 24 January 1880, in the house in which he was born, and was interred in the private burial-ground in North-Bar Street Within. His wife and two sons (George, who took holy orders, and Henry William, a musician) predeceased him.

His father, who died on 15 July 1818, was organist for forty-one years, according to the epitaph on his tombstone in the graveyard, so that the office of organist at Beverley was held by father and son for ninety-seven years.

== Compositions ==
His published compositions include overtures, instrumental chamber music, organ fugues and piano pieces. Some quartets and a septet were played at the meetings of the Society of British Musicians; they were well received but were never published.

Cultural offices
Preceded by George Lambert	Organist of Beverley Minster; 1818-1874	Succeeded by Langdon Colborne
