= Robin Legge =

English music critic (1862–1933)

Robin Humphrey Legge (28 June 1862 – 6 April 1933) was an English music writer, the chief music critic of The Daily Telegraph between 1906 and 1931, often writing under the pen name Musicus.

== Education ==
Born in Bishop's Castle, Shropshire, Legge read law at Trinity Hall, Cambridge and then went abroad to study music and languages in Leipzig, Frankfurt, Florence and Munich. While in Europe he encountered many prominent composers and musicians including Edvard Grieg, Frederick Delius, Percy Grainger, Raimund Mühlen, Arthur Nikisch (to whom he taught English), Ethel Smyth and Julius Stockhausen.

== Music critic ==
From 1891 to 1906 he worked as assistant music critic for The Times, under chief music critic J A Fuller Maitland. During this time he also wrote for the Daily Mail, Life, and acted as Chess Editor of The Daily Courier. He joined The Daily Telegraph in 1906 as chief music critic, succeeding Joseph Bennett, and stayed there until his retirement in 1931, establishing the paper's Saturday music page. At the Daily Telegraph, Legge showed a much more progressive outlook than had been possible while he worked for the highly conservative Fuller Maitland. In 1908 he initiated a regular column, 'Music of the Day', to promote interest in contemporary music. He was one of the first to recognise the genius of Edward Elgar, acknowledged Puccini when he was unfashionable, and took the early days of the gramophone seriously.

Legge was a sociable and humorous man who enjoyed billiards (which he played on occasion with Compton Mackenzie) and chess, and was an active member of the Savile Club. In 1926 Basil Maine produced a character sketch of Legge in his Musical Times column, in which he recalled that Legge's office, at the back of a building in Piccadilly, was a hub of the musical community in London during the 1920s. "He is visited there by all sorts and conditions – performers, composers, critics, agents, teachers, people with new ideas and people with old grievances". Legge, said Maine, "has striven for an amicable relationship between journalism and musical activity". H. C. Colles wrote that Legge had "stimulated the general reader's interest in music and musicians to an uncommon extent".

== Other activities ==
Translations of musical texts include Wallaschek’s (now controversial) Die Musik der Naturvölker, published as Primitive Music in 1893, Hofmann’s Instrumentationslehre (1893), and A. Ehrlich's Celebrated Violinists, Past and Present (1897). As an author, Legge wrote (with W E Hansell) the Annals of the Norfolk and Norwich Triennial Music Festivals (1896), and contributed articles to the Dictionary of National Biography and Grove's Dictionary of Music. He was the editor of the Norfolk Cricket Annual for a decade and published many chess problems. Legge was also an occasional composer: his Romance for cello and piano, marked Op.1 No 1, was published by Schott in 1904.

At the end of his life his address was 33 Oakley Street in Chelsea. He married Aimee Prior Standen (1867–1937) and there was one daughter, Ida Gwendolen (1887–1969). Ida married Henry Burton Tate (of the sugar merchant family) in 1909, but later divorced him. She then married Edward Thomas Walhouse Littleton, 5th Baron Hatherton in 1925 and became Lady Hatherton.
