= Mary Berry (conductor) =

British canoness, conductor and musicologist (1917–2008)

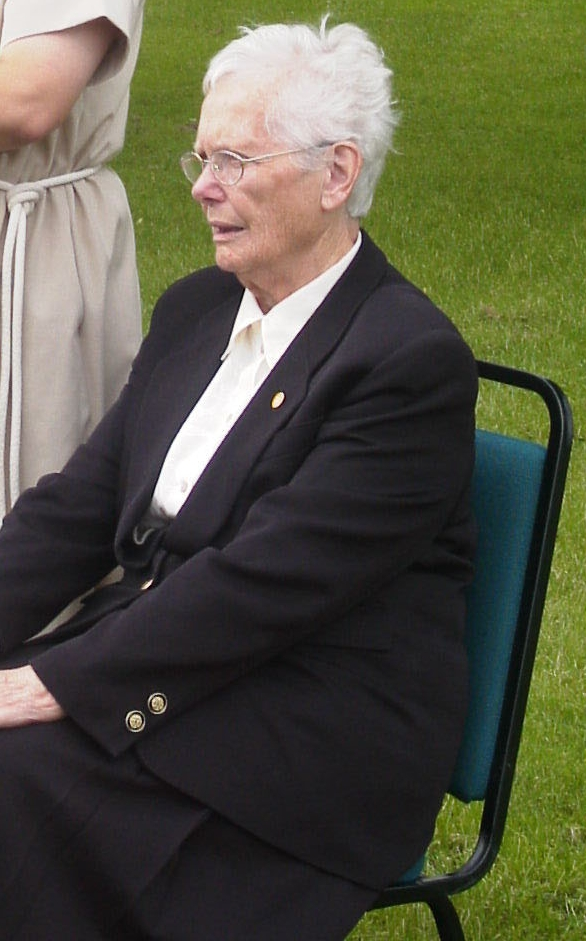
Mary Berry

Mary Berry CBE (29 June 1917 – 1 May 2008), also known as Sister Thomas More CRSA, was a canoness regular, noted choral conductor and musicologist. She was an authority on the performance of Gregorian chant, founding the Schola Gregoriana of Cambridge to revive this ancient style of music.

== Life ==
=== Early life ===
Berry was born in 1917, the daughter of a chemist who was vice-president of Downing College. As a young woman, she went to the Perse School before spending a year at the École Normale de Musique de Paris, where she became a pupil of the conductor and teacher Nadia Boulanger. On returning home, she was awarded a Turle scholarship at Girton College, where she studied with Thurston Dart, but continued to study during her vacations under Boulanger.

An interest in plainchant was encouraged by Berry's supervisor, the Trinity College don Hubert Stanley Middleton. After receiving the university's John Stuart of Rannoch Scholarship in Sacred Music, she took her parents to the Abbey of Solesmes in France, which for decades had been a leader in reviving Gregorian chant.

In 1939, upon graduation from university, Berry joined the Red Cross and nursed at Addenbrooke's Hospital in Cambridge. In March of the following year, she went to Belgium, where she became a novice with the Canonesses Regular of Jupille, under the religious name of Mother Thomas More. But two months later the canonesses were forced to flee the invading Germans on the last train to Paris, having wrapped their few possessions in red blankets. They moved to a former Cistercian monastery in Dijon—in Vichy France, where they resumed their monastic way of life and taught local children. Eventually a fellow novice, the daughter of an ambassador, obtained travel documents for the community to take refuge in Lisbon, where they started up two schools.

After professing solemn vows in 1945, Berry was sent to a school on the Monte Mario in Rome, where she taught English and music and was the infirmarian for the religious community and students. She served there during a typhoid outbreak in the school. She was later sent to study in Belgium, and after that in Dijon, where her French professors disparaged her "antediluvian" English. It was around this time that she started lecturing in Paris on Gregorian chant and polyphony.

=== Gregorian chant ===
On returning home to England during the 1960s, Berry embarked on a doctorate in musicology at Cambridge University. She had some difficulty, however, in persuading the musical establishment that plainchant was a suitable topic for graduate study. For her degree, she submitted a thesis on the performance of plainsong in the Late Middle Ages and the 16th century. There was a problem, though, as she had written her thesis in French, so that it had to be sent to Solesmes for examination. Despite this, in 1970 she received her doctorate.

During this period, Berry saw the liturgy of the Roman Catholic Church change dramatically, with the introduction of the vernacular in the Mass and Divine Office, both significant parts of her daily routine as a canoness. These changes included a widespread dropping of Gregorian chant in favor of contemporary spiritual music. She then decided that action was needed to save this integral part of Church life going back for over a millennium.

By the time Berry had been awarded her doctorate, however, these changes had come to affect Berry's religious community. The chapter of her religious order had decided to concentrate on a more practical apostolate. Deeply unhappy that two promises made at her final profession – to teach and to celebrate solemnly the Divine Office – were being downplayed. At that point, Berry volunteered to be exclaustrated. She was allowed to live out her religious commitment as a canoness outside the community for the rest of her life.

Berry then became director of musical studies at her alma mater of Girton College. She later went to teach at Newnham College, where she was director of musical studies and then a full fellow and praelector, until she retired in 1984.

=== Conductor ===
To promote Gregorian chant, Berry gathered a chorus of amateur singers, both Catholic and Anglican, as well as choirmasters and organists to form a body which would perform the ancient music. Seeking a venue where they could play, she was turned down by several colleges and churches until she was allowed to use the chapel of St John's College for one performance. To present their music, a Solemn High Mass was celebrated by Alan Clark, the Roman Catholic Bishop of East Anglia, for which more than three times the expected number of participants attended. After such a display of interest, it was agreed that an occasional choir, made up of choral scholars and talented amateurs, would be allowed to give concerts in the chapel.

In 1975 Berry founded the Schola Gregoriana of Cambridge for the study and performance of Gregorian chant. The Cantors of the Schola are a group of young, largely professional singers and have performed and recorded extensively under her direction, often working from primary sources. The Schola was one of the first ensembles to perform (and certainly the first to record) music from the Winchester troper after research by Berry and others made the music accessible from the manuscripts.

Berry traveled widely to promote the teaching and singing of Gregorian chant, and organized and participated in many workshops and courses, including Spode Music Week, of which she was a patron. She was a particularly keen advocate for the use of Gregorian chant in its proper liturgical context. One result is the Community of Jesus, a large ecumenical community in Massachusetts which sings the full monastic day and night office, with responsibility shared between clergy, cantors, religious and married people.

In the mid-1990s, Berry led the recordings of music entitled Angels from the Vatican, which was designed to accompany an exhibition of art from the Vatican Museums that toured the United States in 1997, which was recorded in the chapel of St. Hugh's Charterhouse in West Sussex. In 1997 she led a recording in the Roman Basilica of San Gregorio Magno al Celio to commemorate the 1400th anniversary of Augustine of Canterbury's arrival in England. In June 1999, she and her group were allowed to record in St. Peter's Basilica, where they recorded an album entitled Tu es Petrus ('Thou art Peter').

Berry wrote two introductory books, Plainchant for everyone and Cantors: A collection of Gregorian chants, to encourage people to learn the chant. They are often recommended to beginners in the field. She also wrote for Gramophone and the New Grove Dictionary of Music.

In 2000 Berry was awarded the Papal Cross Pro Ecclesia et Pontifice by Pope John Paul II to honor her for her service to the Roman Catholic Church. In the 2002 New Year Honours, she was appointed CBE by Queen Elizabeth II.

Berry died in 2008 and was buried in the Church of St Birinus at Dorchester, Oxfordshire, where her Schola had sung the Paschal Triduum for the previous ten years.

== Select bibliography ==
- Plainchant for everyone: An introduction to plainsong (1979) ISBN 0-85402-076-4
- Cantors: a collection of Gregorian chants (1979) ISBN 0-521-22149-8
