= George Robertson Sinclair =

English cathedral organist (1863–1917)

Sinclair in 1900

George Robertson Sinclair (28 October 1863 – 7 February 1917) was an English cathedral organist, who served at Truro and Hereford cathedrals.

As a young man, Sinclair was destined for the Anglican priesthood, but in 1880 his father died and Sinclair needed to earn a living immediately. He became the first cathedral organist of the new diocese of Truro. He moved from Truro to become organist of Hereford Cathedral in 1889, where he remained for the rest of his life.

At Hereford, Sinclair was conductor of eight Three Choirs Festivals between 1891 and 1912, working with leading British musicians of the day, including Edward Elgar, who incorporated into his Enigma Variations a portrait of Sinclair and his bulldog.

== Life and career ==
=== Early years ===
Sinclair was born in Croydon, the son of Dr R S Sinclair, director of public education in Bombay. The family had Irish connections, and at the age of eight, Sinclair entered the Royal Irish Academy of Music in Dublin. In 1873, aged ten, he gained a choral scholarship at St Michael's College, Tenbury, under the headship of Sir Frederick Ouseley. He remained there for six years, singing in the choir at the daily services and deputising as organist.

1879 Sinclair became assistant organist to Charles Harford Lloyd at Gloucester Cathedral and parish organist of St Mary-de-Crypt, Gloucester. It had been expected that he would become an Anglican priest, but when he was seventeen his father died, and Sinclair was obliged to earn an income at once. In 1880, Edward White Benson, first Bishop of Truro, asked Ouseley for advice on a suitable organist for the new Truro Cathedral. Ouseley recommended Sinclair, who was appointed, aged 17. He designed a high-specification four-manual organ built by Father Willis, and assembled and trained a choir.

=== Hereford and the Three Choirs Festival ===
"The Metamorphosis of Dan" – Sinclair and his dog Dan were famously inseparable

In 1889, Langdon Colborne, organist of Hereford Cathedral died, and Sinclair was appointed to succeed him. In a profile of him in The Musical Times in October 1900, the anonymous author wrote:

He conducted the last four Hereford Musical Festivals – 1891, 1894, 1897, and 1900 – with conspicuous success. Through his persevering energy the sum of £2,300 was raised to re-build the Cathedral organ, the work being carried out by Father Willis. The Ouseley Memorial window, a prominent feature in the Cathedral, is also largely due to his exertions, and his influence on the musical life of Hereford and the neighbourhood is very great and beneficial to the progress of the art in that fertile region. As an organist, accompanist, and solo player Dr. Sinclair occupies a very high place in technical attainment and sympathetic feeling.

In 1900 Sinclair was appointed conductor of the Birmingham Festival Choral Society, one of whose members drew a caricature of Sinclair and his bulldog Dan, from whom he was inseparable, and who attended all rehearsals. Sinclair's friend Edward Elgar depicted Dan in the Enigma Variations. The eleventh variation, in G minor, Allegro di molto headed "G.R.S." portrays Dan falling into the River Wye and, in Elgar's words, "paddling upstream to find a landing place; and his rejoicing bark on landing. G.R.S. said, 'Set that to music'. I did; here it is." The variation also depicts Sinclair's impetuous character and his skilful organ pedalling.

At Hereford, Sinclair was chief conductor of the Three Choirs Festivals of 1891, 1894, 1897, 1900, 1903, 1906, 1909 and 1912. He modernised the repertoire of the festivals, introducing music of peripheral religious relevance, including Parsifal, and of wholly secular character, such as Tchaikovsky's Pathétique Symphony. In a country still suspicious of Roman Catholicism, Sinclair programmed Verdi's Requiem, and made a considerable success with it in 1900. He, together with Elgar and Stanford and the soloists, sent a telegram to the aged composer reporting "una recita splendida del Requiem Festival di Hereford".

Sinclair died suddenly in Birmingham, aged 53, after conducting a rehearsal.

== Dedications and memorials ==
Sinclair was also the dedicatee of Elgar's Te Deum and Benedictus (1897), "Pomp and Circumstance March" No.4 (1907) and A Christmas Greeting (1907). A biographical tablet was erected to his memory in Hereford Cathedral in 1920.

== Notes ==
Cultural offices
Preceded by (First Organist)	Organist and Master of the Choristers of Truro Cathedral; 1880–1889	Succeeded by Mark James Monk
Preceded by Langdon Colborne	Organist and Master of the Choristers of Hereford Cathedral; 1889–1917	Succeeded by Percy Clarke Hull
