= Philip Moore (organist) =

English composer and organist (born 1943)

- Born: Philip John Moore; 30 September 1943; London
- Occupations: Organist, choirmaster and composer (Director of Music at York Minster (1983−2008)
- Website: www.philipmooremusic.com

Philip John Moore (born 30 September 1943) is an English composer and organist.

== Early life and education ==
Moore was born in London and attended Maidstone Grammar School. While studying organ and piano at the Royal College of Music, he served as organist and choirmaster at St Gabriel's Church in Cricklewood, London.

== Career ==
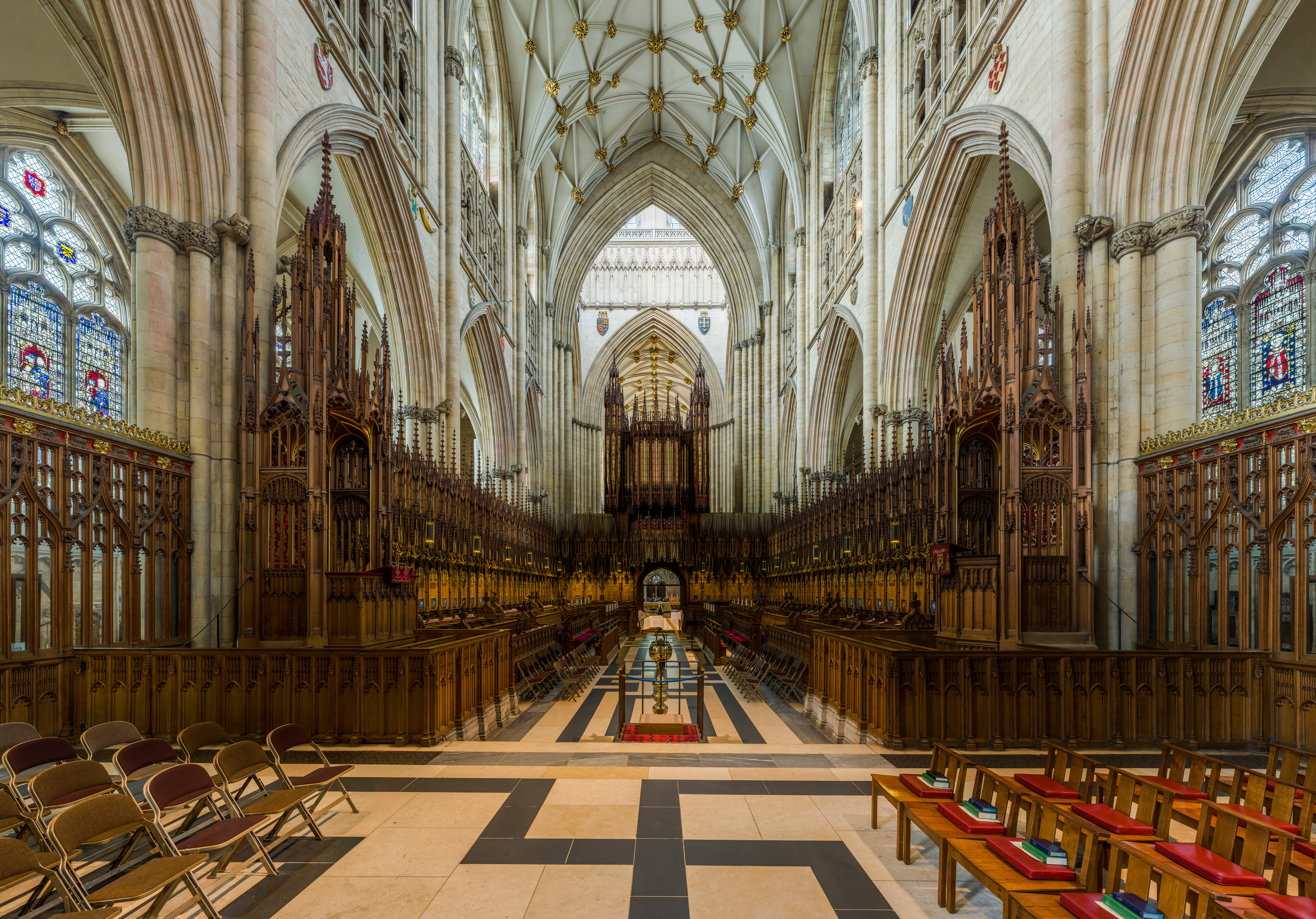
The choir of York Minster, where Moore served as Organist and Director of Music for 25 years.

Moore was assistant music master and organist at Eton College for three years before becoming assistant organist at Canterbury Cathedral in 1968. He was appointed Organist and Master of the Choristers at Guildford Cathedral in 1974 and succeeded Francis Jackson in 1983 as Organist and Master of the Music at York Minster, a post he held until his retirement in 2008. During his 25 years at York he oversaw many changes, including working with the Dean, Raymond Furnell, to introduce girl choristers into the previously all-male choir in 1997. He also conducted the York Musical Society for 27 years.

In retirement Moore was appointed Organist Emeritus of York Minister and served for some time as organist of his local church, St Michael's, Barton-le-Street. He has also been a visiting artist and associate organist at Christ Church, Greenwich, in Connecticut, USA, having composed several pieces for the church's choirs. In 2015 he began a two-year term as President of the Royal College of Organists.

== Honours ==
Upon retirement, Moore was awarded the Order of St William by the Archbishop of York, and in 2014 was given an honorary doctorate from the University of York. He also holds a Bachelor of Music degree from Durham University. In 2016 the Archbishop of Canterbury awarded him the Cranmer Award for Worship "for his contribution to the English choral tradition as a composer, arranger and performer".

== Compositions ==
Moore has composed a numerous works, primarily for choir and organ, including the following:

=== Choral works ===
- Paean (2022) for solo soprano, chorus and organ (written for and premiered by the Alleyn Singers directed by Julian Parkin-Haig with Sean Montgomery, organ) at Christ Church Cathedral, Oxford on 13 August 2022 for the choir’s 50th anniversary
- Requiem (2017) (premiered by the BBC Singers with Stephen Farr, organ)
- Alternative Canticles (for the Holst Singers)
- Three Prayers of Dietrich Bonhoeffer
- I will lift up mine eyes (2012, for Matthew Owens and the choir of Wells Cathedral)
- God be in my head (2011, for Lee Dunleavy and the choir of All Saints' Church, Northampton)
- Magnificat and Nunc Dimittis (Sancti Johannis Cantabrigiense) (2006, for St John's College, Cambridge)
- O praise God in his holiness (2007, commissioned by the Exultate Singers for the fifth anniversary of their founding)
- Holy is the true light (2006)
- A Canticle of Light (2002)
- God is our hope and strength (2001, for the choir of St Mary Redcliffe Church, Bristol)
- From Earth to Heaven (1999, commissioned by the choir of Leeds Minster for the dedication of the Sally-Scott window)
- Lo! God is here! (1997, for John Scott and the choir of St Paul's Cathedral)
- Preces and Responses (1995, for Guildford Cathedral)
- Lo! That is a marvellous change (1991, for men's voices)
- O Lord, support us (1991)
- In paradisum (1988)
- It is a thing most wonderful (1987)
- All Wisdom Cometh from the Lord (1983)
- God is gone up (1980)

=== Organ music ===
- Via Crucis (2021)
- Prelude and Fugue on the name of Jackson (2017, for the 100th birthday of Francis Jackson)
- A Fugal Flourish on "Personent Hodie" (2013)
- Variations and Fugue on East Acklam (2007, for the 90th birthday of Francis Jackson)
- Sinfonietta (2001)
- Prelude and Fugue in G (1994)
- Impromptu (1987, for the 70th birthday of Francis Jackson)
- Five Sketches on Helmsley (1983)
- Sonata for organ (1982)

=== Carols ===
- Angel Gabriel (2019, commissioned by Daniel Hyde for the Festival of Nine Lessons and Carols at King's College, Cambridge)
- Quem Pastores (2018, for the choir of the Cathedral Church of the Advent, Birmingham, Alabama)
- Sing lullaby (2018, for the choirs of Christ Church, Greenwich, Connecticut)

Preceded by Barry Rose	Organist and Director of Music, Guildford Cathedral; 1974 – 1983	Succeeded by Andrew Millington
Preceded by Francis Jackson	Organist and Director of Music, York Minster; 1983 – 2008	Succeeded by Robert Sharpe
