= Song of Liberty =

British patriotic song

"Song of Liberty" is a British patriotic song which became popular during the Second World War.

The song was set to the music of Edward Elgar's Pomp and Circumstance March No. 4. It followed the success of Land of Hope and Glory, another patriotic song with lyrics by A. C. Benson set to Elgar's Pomp and Circumstance March No. 1. In 1940, six years after the death of the composer, A. P. Herbert (with permission) wrote lyrics to the tune.

It is not known who arranged the music for the song: they would have been known to the publisher at the time, but their name is not acknowledged on the publication.

== Lyrics ==
Herbert wrote two verses for the song, each followed by a refrain:

"All men must be free
March for liberty with me.
Brutes and braggarts may ...
have their little sway
We shall never bend the knee ..." from which the song gets its title.

== In popular culture ==
The song appears in Stanley Kubrick's 1971 film A Clockwork Orange in an ironic way while the main character is on his way to a Pavlov training session; said session involves the use of torture that makes Alex unable of doing the violent acts he used to do because they reminded him of the pain he saw in the sex-and-violence-heavy films he watched during the program.
