= Kenneth Beard =

- Occupation: Aviator
- Known for: Early aviation and military flight service

Kenneth Bernard Beard FRCO(CHM) (9 June 1927, in Royton, Lancashire – 9 July 2010) was an English Cathedral Organist.

== Education ==
He attended Kingswood School, Bath, and studied at the University of Manchester and the Royal Manchester College of Music from 1946 to 1949.

After Manchester, he was organ scholar at Emmanuel College, Cambridge.

He was also made a Fellow of the Royal College of Organists in 1949, and gained a Choirmaster diploma in 1954.

== Career ==
He was:

- Organist of St. Michael's College, Tenbury 1952–1959
- Rector Chori of Southwell Minster 1959–1988
- Organist of St Mary's Church, Mold

During his time in Tenbury, he commissioned the anthem “Antiphon” from Benjamin Britten and conducted the first performance on 29 September 1956 in the presence of the composer.

At Southwell he was not only the organist of the Minster, but also head of Music of Southwell Minster School.

He was awarded the Cross of St Augustine by Rowan Williams, Archbishop of Canterbury, in 2008 in recognition of his service to church music.

Cultural offices
Preceded by Maxwell Menzies	Organist of St. Michael's College, Tenbury; 1952–1959	Succeeded by Lucian Nethsingha
Preceded by David Lumsden	Rector Chori of Southwell Minster; 1959–1988	Succeeded by Paul Hale
