= St Michael's College, Tenbury =

St Michael's College
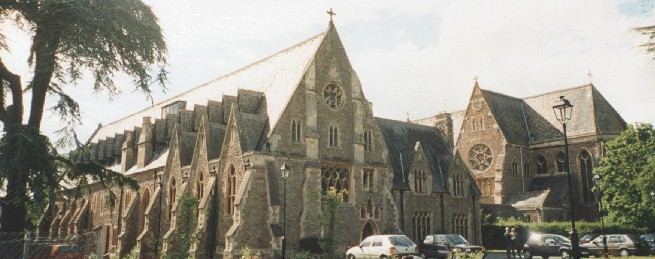

Location
- Oldwood Road; Tenbury Wells; Worcestershire, WR15 8PH; England
- Coordinates: 52.287971°N 2.612949°W

Information
- Type: Private Preparatory school Boarding school
- Religious affiliation: Anglican
- Established: 1856
- Founder: Sir Frederick Arthur Gore Ouseley Bt.
- Closed: 1985
- Gender: Co-ed
- Age: 8 to 13
- Houses: Gore, Ouseley, Fellowes and Nicholson
- Website: http://www.smcsociety.co.uk/

St Michael's College (the College of St Michael and All Angels) at Tenbury Wells, Worcestershire, England, was founded by Sir Frederick Ouseley in 1856 as a boys' preparatory school. Ouseley created the school to provide a model for the performance of Anglican church music. Choral services were performed daily in term time. The college possessed a library that contained rare books of international importance. Financial difficulties forced its closure in 1985.

The buildings were reopened as an independent international boarding school under the name of King's College Saint Michael's in 1990, before closing in June 2020 as a consequence of the COVID-19 pandemic.

In August 2024, the site was bought by SIAS Education Group and Anglo Independence School. It re-opened as St Michael Abbey School in September 2025.

== History ==
The school was founded in reaction to the decline of Anglican church music in the Victorian period. Ouseley sited it in a remote location so as to insulate it from the influence of London. Designed by architect Henry Woodyer, until its closure the school regularly sang 150 settings of evensong; it was the last educational establishment in England to sing the orders throughout the week. In the school chapel the choir is separated from the chancel by an ornate gilded screen topped by candles. The choir is backed by a 'Father' Willis organ, painted with a representation of St Michael defeating the dragon.

Recordings of the choir are listed in the British Library Sound Archive and are available on CD in back catalogue editions. A recording of the final Evensong sung at the school in 1985 is found on the Archive of Recorded Church Music site

The school chapel is now the parish church for the surrounding village of St Michael's which was created to support the creation of the school.

Poet Laureate Sir John Betjeman spoke of the college, referring to:

"……..the unique atmosphere of St. Michael’s College, Tenbury. I shall never forget my first impression of the place. There was the climb up from the little market town of Tenbury whence some of the lay clerks make their twice daily journey to Mattins and Evensong to lend men’s voices to the boys’ choir, and there before me stretched an enormous common. In the far corner, in a land of blossoming orchards and backed by the blue distance of Clee Hill, rose a chapel, seemingly as large as Lancing.

Attached to it were Warden’s house, school buildings, cloister and dining hall, all in a style of the fourteenth century, re-interpreted in local materials for the nineteenth century by architect, Henry Woodyer.

After Evensong, where the music was equal to that of the best cathedral choirs, and a walk round the buildings in the quiet of a Worcestershire evening, I visited the large dormitory, which runs almost the whole length of a building parallel with the chapel. Here Christopher Hassall read his poem to the boys and held them spellbound as the stars shone through the narrow Gothic windows in the gabled roof…………"

=== School crest ===
School crest

The crest on the school tie was a red broadsword on a blue background symbolising St Michael's defeat of the dragon by its colour and the two kinks in the sword.

=== Musical library ===
Supported by friends of Ouseley, the library contained such important articles as the original score of Purcell's Dido and Aeneas and Handel's own conducting score from the Dublin premiere of Messiah. It was therefore a site of pilgrimage for musical scholars, including Benjamin Britten After the school's closure the library was transferred to the Bodleian Library.

=== Organists of the college ===
- John Capel Hanbury 1856 - 1857
- John Stainer 1857 - 1859 (later organist of Magdalen College, Oxford and St Paul's Cathedral)
- Langdon Colborne 1860 - 1874 (then organist of Beverley Minster)
- Alfred Alexander 1874 - 1877 (then organist of Wigan Parish Church)
- William Claxton 1877 - 1886
- Walter J. Lancaster 1886 - 1889 (then organist of Bolton Parish Church, Lancashire)
- Allan Paterson 1889 - 1893 (then organist of Malvern Priory)
- James Lyon 1893 - 1896 (then organist of St Mark's Church, Surbiton)
- Edgar C. Broadhurst 1896 - 1907
- M. Gordon Burgess 1907 - 1910
- J.P. Davis 1910 - 1911
- Norman Charles Woods 1911 - 1912
- Arthur Baynon 1913 - 1916
- Carlton Borrow 1917
- Vivian Stuart 1918
- Ernest Bullock 1919
- Heathcote Dicken Statham 1920 - 1926
- Stanley Thorne 1926 - 1931
- Laurence Crosthwaite 1931 - 1935
- Maxwell Menzies 1935 - 1952 (duties undertaken by Sir Sydney Nicholson from 1940 and C E S Littlejohn from 1941 while Maxwell Menzies was away in the armed forces)
- Kenneth Beard 1952 - 1959 (afterwards rector chori at Southwell Minster)
- Lucian Nethsingha 1959 - 1973 (afterwards organist of Exeter Cathedral)
- Roger Judd 1973 - 1985 (later Assistant Organist St George's Chapel, Windsor Castle)

=== Alumni ===
The St Michael's College Society, an active Old Boys and Girls society, from the original Frederick Ouseley foundation, and which in 2006 celebrated its centenary, holds a reunion meeting each year. Membership is open to all those with a connection to the 1856 -1985 College days.

Notable alumni include:

- Harold "Barehands" Bates, Royal Navy officer
- John Blashford-Snell, Explorer
- Stephen Glover, Journalist
- Jonathan Harvey, Composer
- Christopher Robinson, Choirmaster and organist
- Clifford Rose, Actor
- George Robertson Sinclair, organist at Truro and Hereford cathedral, friend of Edward Elgar
- Jolyon Jenkins, journalist and broadcaster
- Martin Stokes, ethnomusicologist
- Roger Brock, classicist

== More recent history of the buildings ==
The year after the college closed the school buildings were used as the set for the 1986 film, The Worst Witch based on the novel by Jill Murphy, starring Diana Rigg, Tim Curry and Fairuza Balk.

From 1990 to 2020 the buildings were occupied by King’s Saint Michael’s College which was an international boarding school with students from many countries. It closed in 2020. That school specialised in providing education to international students by providing an intensive English language course alongside the traditional curriculum of GCSEs and A Levels. The school also ran a University Foundation Course. During the months of July and August, Saint Michael's ran an English language summer school for students from around the world.

The buildings were bought in 2024. The newly formed St Michael Abbey School opened in September 2025.
