= George Cooper (organist) =

English organist and music educator

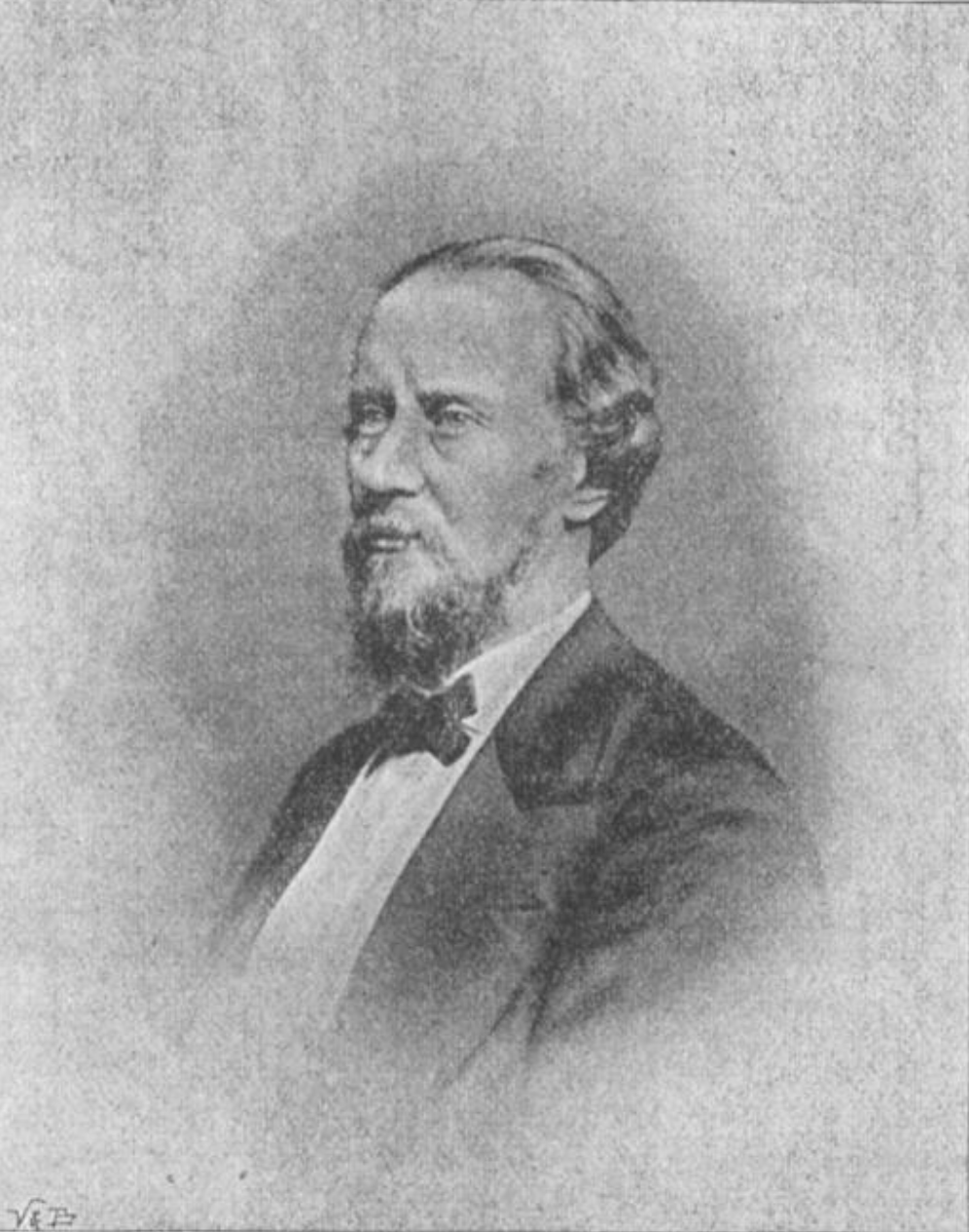
George Cooper (1820–1876)

George Cooper (1820 – 1876) was an English organist and music educator.

Born in Lambeth, Cooper was the son of organist George Cooper Sr (c.1783–1843). He succeeded his father as assistant organist at St Paul's Cathedral in 1838, having already substituted for his father periodically since 1832. He remained in that position for the rest of his life, also serving concurrently as organist at a variety of other smaller London churches. One of such positions was St Sepulchre-without-Newgate, where he was organist from 1843 to 1876, succeeding his father, and grandfather (c.1750–1799) in the post. From 1867 until his death 9 years later. he was the organist and choir master at the Chapel Royal, St. James's.

His students included Canadian organist Romain-Octave Pelletier I; English organists Edmund Chipp, Langdon Colborne, Walter Parratt, John Stainer and Henry Willis; English conductor Henry Wood; and Arthur Sullivan, English composer.

He died in Holborn, and his funeral was held in St. Paul's Cathedral.

== Positions held ==
- Organist of St Benet's, Paul's Wharf, 1833–1844
- Organist of SS Anne and Agnes, 1836–1844
- Assistant Organist of St Paul's Cathedral, 1838–1876
- Organist of St Sepulchre-without-Newgate, 1843–1876
- Organist and Choir Master of Christ's Hospital, 1844–1876
- Organist and Choir Master of Chapel Royal, St. James's, 1867–1876
