= Lucian Nethsingha =

British cathedral organist (1936–2021)

Lucian Nethsingha (3 May 1936 − 12 February 2021) was a British musician born in Ceylon, who served as organist of Exeter Cathedral from 1973 to 1999. He was the father of Andrew Nethsingha, the current organist and master of the choristers at Westminster Abbey.

== Early life and education ==
Nethsingha was born in Colombo, Ceylon (now Sri Lanka), and attended S. Thomas' College in Mount Lavinia, where he sang in the chapel choir. The college chaplain, Canon Roy Bowyer-Yin, who had previously been the chaplain at King's College, Cambridge, encouraged Nethsingha's parents to send him to England to continue his studies there. Having won gold medals for piano from Trinity College, London, and the Associated Board of the Royal Schools of Music, he set out for England in 1954 at the age of 18.

After training at the Royal College of Music with Ralph Downes and Herbert Howells, he continued his studies at King's College, Cambridge, with Boris Ord and David Willcocks.

== Career ==
After graduating in 1959, Nethsingha was appointed organist and master of the choristers of St. Michael's College, Tenbury. He remained there until 1973, when he became organist and at Exeter Cathedral. As well as leading the cathedral choir on international tours, he also conducted for the Exeter Choral Society and the Bournemouth Symphony Orchestra.

In later life, he also returned to Sri Lanka as choirmaster of the S. Thomas' College choir.

He left the cathedral in 1999 and spent his retirement in Cambridge.

== Personal life ==
With his wife Jane (née Symons), who died in 2015, Nethsingha had a son, Andrew, who followed in his father's footsteps as a church musician, and a daughter, Alison.

He died in 2021 at the age of 84.

Cultural offices
Preceded by Kenneth Beard	Organist of St. Michael's College, Tenbury; 1959-1973	Succeeded by Roger Judd
Preceded by Lionel Dakers	Organist and Master of the Choristers of Exeter Cathedral; 1973-1999	Succeeded by Andrew Millington
