= St Martin's Church, Liskeard =

St Martin’s Church, Liskeard
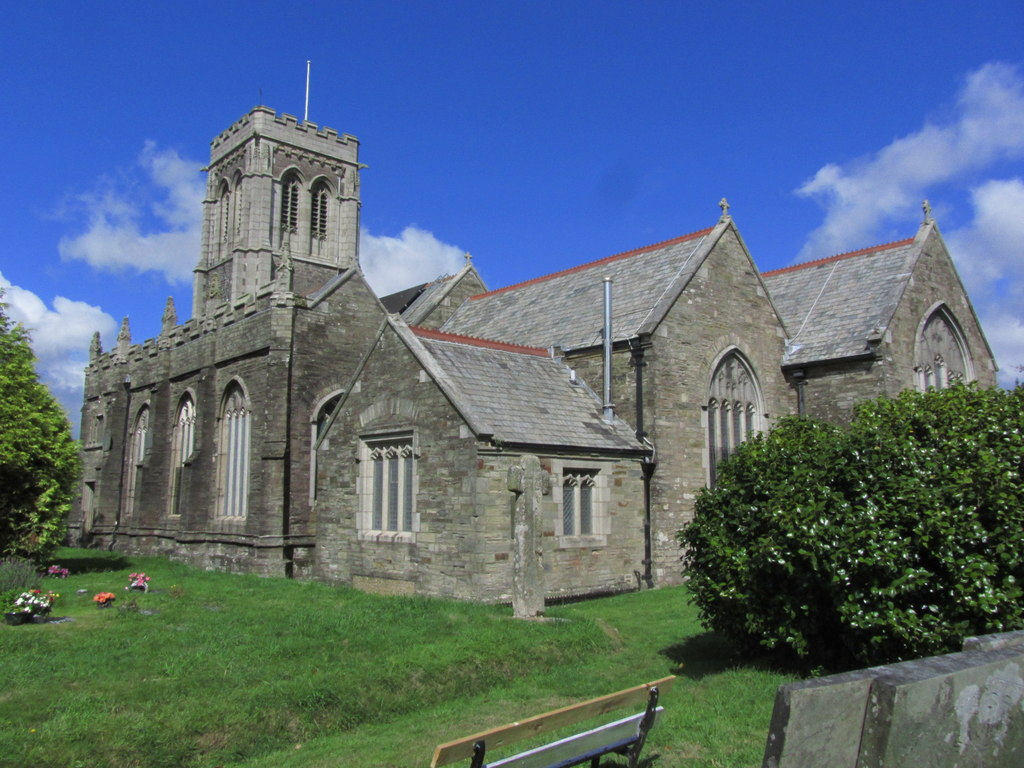
- St Martin’s Church, Liskeard

- Location within Cornwall
- 50°27′11.28″N 04°27′36.65″W
- Location: Liskeard, Cornwall
- Country: England
- Denomination: Church of England
- Churchmanship: Broad Church

History
- Dedication: Martin of Tours

Architecture
- Heritage designation: Grade II* listed

Specifications
- Length: 136 feet (41 m)
- Width: 58 feet (18 m)
- Height: 85 feet (26 m)

Administration
- Province: Canterbury
- Diocese: Truro
- Archdeaconry: Bodmin
- Deanery: West Wivelshire
- Parish: Liskeard

Listed Building – Grade II*
- Official name: Parish Church of St Martin
- Designated: 23 September 1950
- Reference no.: 1206300

St Martin's Church, Liskeard is a Church of England parish church in Liskeard, Cornwall, the second-largest parish church in Cornwall after St Petroc's Church, Bodmin.

== History ==
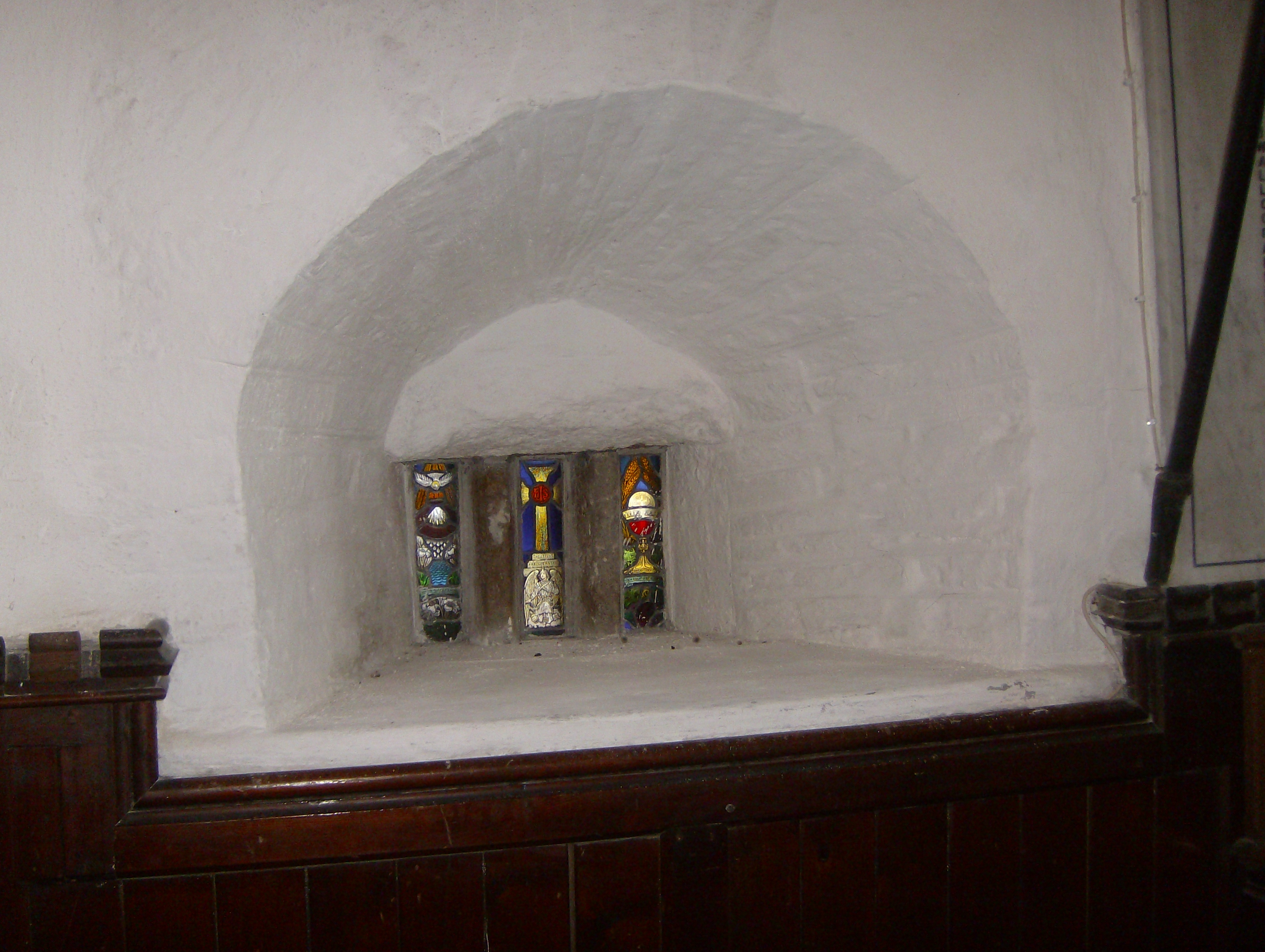
The squint

The church includes some Norman fragments, but is mostly 15th century. The South Chapel dates from 1428, the south chancel aisle from 1430, and additions to the north side from 1477. The tower was repaired in 1675, but was largely rebuilt between 1898 and 1902 at a cost of £6,400 (equivalent to £680,100 in 2025) by John Sampson of Liskeard.

The structure of the church was restored in 1878–1879 at a cost of over £3,700 (equivalent to £397,500 in 2025) under the direction of Richard Coad, architect, of Liskeard and London, by the contractor Mr. Lang. There was a further restoration in 1890 for the interior.

Tencreek cross and Culverland cross are stone crosses in the churchyard. The former was found in 1903 at Tencreek Farm and was moved to the churchyard in 1908. The latter was also moved here in 1908 and is thought to have come from a site near Trevecca.

== Renovation ==
In late 2018 St Martin's Church undertaken a major renovation in which the church was closed until 9 September; parishioners would have had to use St Keyne's Church, or attend services held in the church halls of St Keyne until the renovation was complete. The renovation replaced the pews with stow-able chairs, a new heating system, much improved AV facilities, improved toilets, and added the welcome addition of a small cafe.

== Organ ==
An organ was installed in 1844 by James Chapman Bishop at a cost of £300 (equivalent to £33,000 in 2025). It was opened on 24 November 1844 by Mr Marsh, late organist at Penzance. This was replaced (except for two stops which were retained) in 1879 at a cost of £200 (equivalent to £21,500 in 2025) by an organ built by Hele and Company. This was renovated and enlarged in 1914 by William Hill and Son. In 1923 by Hele and Company rebuilt it with tubular pneumatic action at a cost of £1,000 (equivalent to £52,300 in 2025). The opening recital was given by Hubert Stanley Middleton on 20 June 1923. It was restored again in 1980 by Lance Foy. It now contains three manuals and 40 speaking stops. A specification of the organ can be found on the National Pipe Organ Register.

== The bells ==
The tower currently has eight bells in the key of E flat. The 1st, 2nd and 6th are by Mears and Stainbank dating from 1901, the 3rd is by John Pennington from 1819, the 4th is by Christopher Pennington dating from 1755, the 5th is by Thomas Mears from 1825, the 7ths is from 1735 by John Peninngton, and the tenor of 13.41 long hundredweight (681 kg) is by Christopher Pennington of 1755.

== Parish status ==
The church is in a joint parish with St Keyne's Church, St Keyne.
