= Henry Willis =

English organ builder (1821–1901)

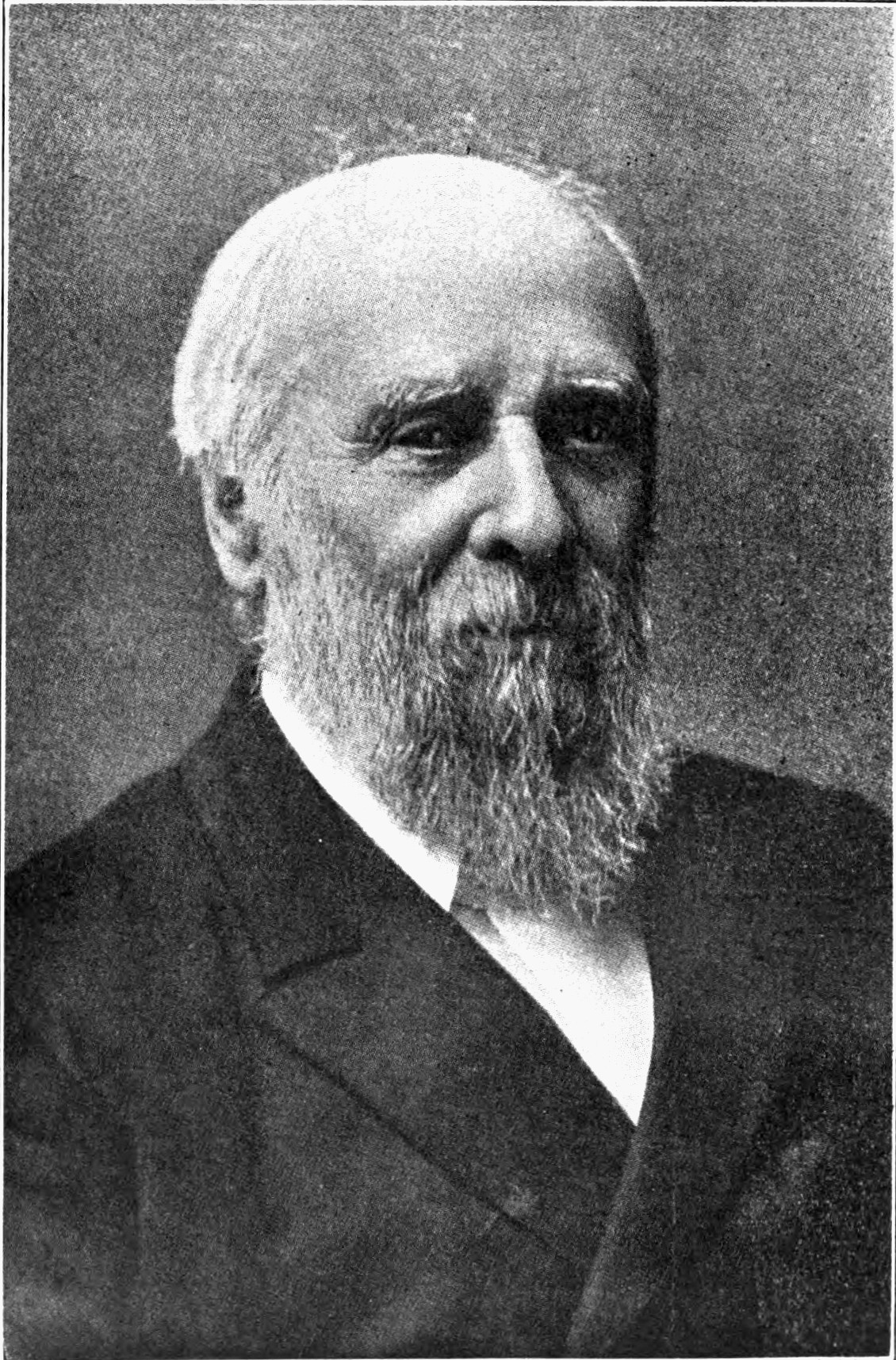
"Father" Henry Willis

Henry Willis (27 April 1821 – 11 February 1901), also known as "Father" Willis, was an English organ player and builder, who is regarded as the foremost English organ builder of the Victorian era. His company Henry Willis & Sons remains in business.

== Early life and work ==
Willis was born in London, the son of a North London builder, and with George Cooper, later sub-organist of St Paul's Cathedral, he learned to play the organ with some help from Thomas Attwood, St Paul's organist. In 1835, Willis was articled to organ builder John Gray (later of Gray and Davison) for seven years. During this time, he invented the manual and pedal couplers which he used throughout his later career.

Following his apprenticeship he worked for three years in Cheltenham, assisting an instrument maker, Wardle Evans, who specialised in free reed instruments. Willis later attributed his personal skill in reed voicing to this experience. Willis met Samuel Sebastian Wesley at Cheltenham, and this led to the re-building of the Gloucester Cathedral organ in 1847. Willis had become an independent organ builder and commented, "It was my stepping stone to fame... I received £400 for the job, and was presumptuous enough to marry."

== Growth of his reputation ==
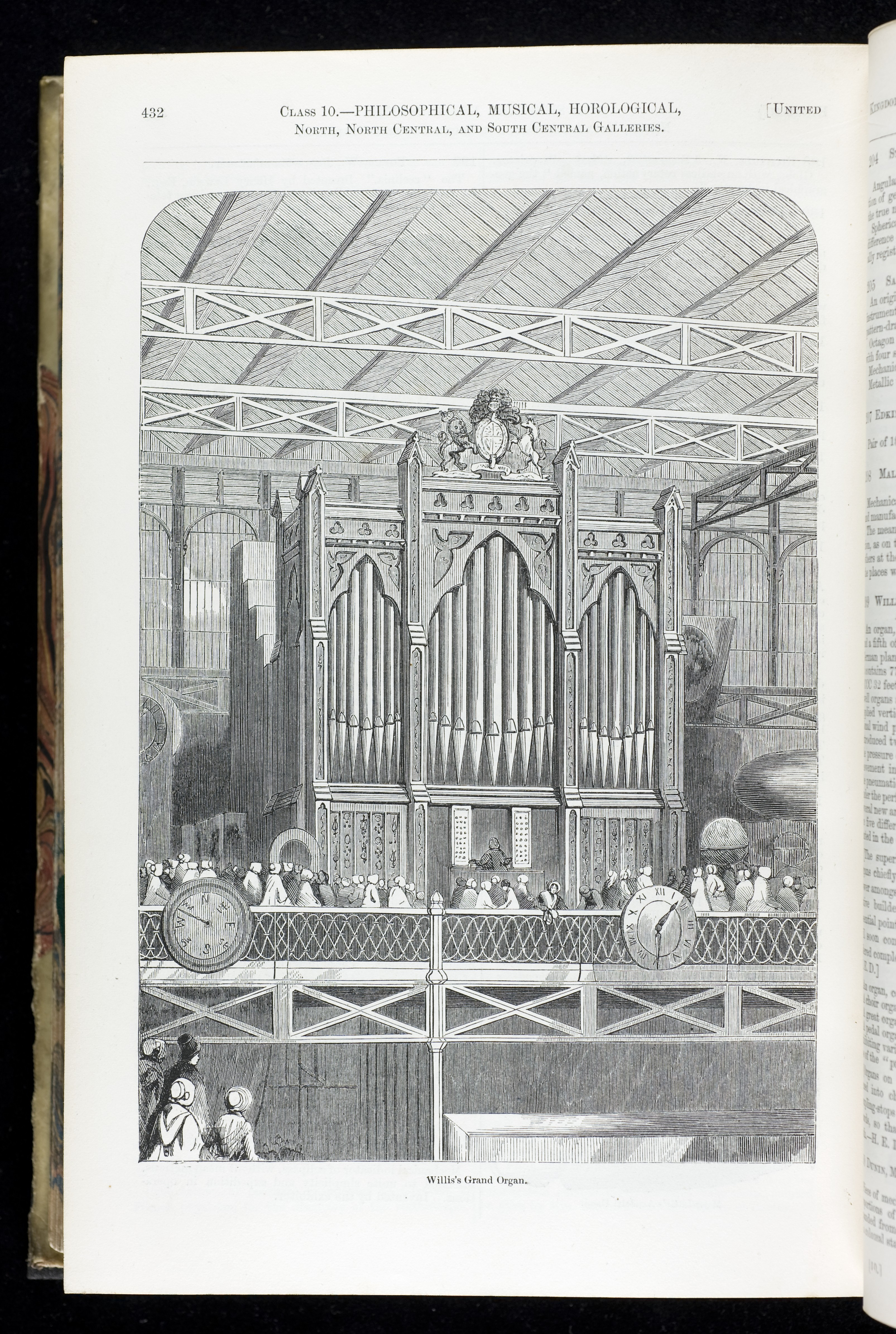
Willis organ at the great Exhibition

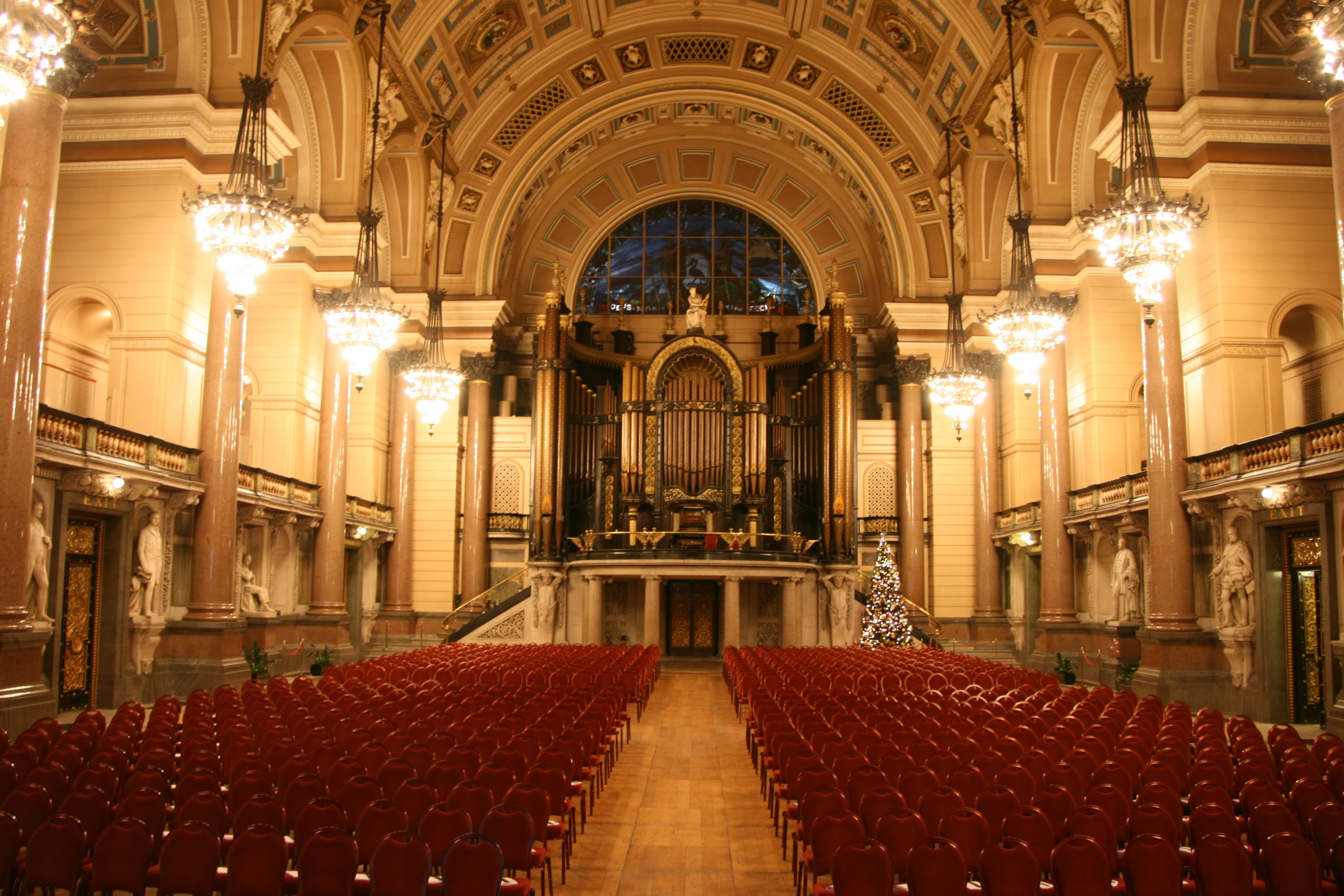
The Willis St George's Hall organ, Liverpool

For the Great Exhibition of 1851, Willis erected the largest of the organs exhibited with an unprecedented 70 speaking stops. He introduced several novel features, which had a significant effect on organ design. Piston buttons were inserted between the manuals to allow automatic selection of blocks of "stops", and Barker lever servo action was used on the manuals to overcome the constraints of tracker action connecting rods for an instrument of such size and complexity. After the exhibition ended, the instrument was erected in reduced form at Winchester Cathedral where in 1854 it now had 49 speaking stops over four manuals and pedals, and the first concave and radiating pedalboard. The pedalboard was the joint idea of Willis and Samuel Sebastian Wesley with whom Willis collaborated on his next large organ of 100 speaking stops at St George's Hall, Liverpool in 1855.

== The foremost Victorian organ builder ==
The Exhibition organ had led to the contract for St George's Hall, Liverpool, where the virtuosic playing of W.T. Best drew large crowds, and also spread the fame of Willis as a builder still further. In a long career stretching to the end of the 19th century, Willis subsequently built the Royal Albert Hall Organ along with the organs at the Alexandra Palace and St Paul's Cathedral. Among the approximately 1,000 other organs that he built or re-built were the cathedral instruments at Canterbury, Carlisle, Coventry, Durham, Edinburgh (St Mary's Episcopal Cathedral), Exeter, Glasgow (The High Kirk of Glasgow), Gloucester, Hereford, Lincoln, St David's, Salisbury, Truro, Wells and Winchester. In addition there were a large number of concert and parish church organs of note, including the organ at St George's Hall Windsor Castle, destroyed by fire in 1992.

The last major instrument which he personally supervised was at St Bees Priory in 1899, which he voiced himself, although approaching his 80th year.

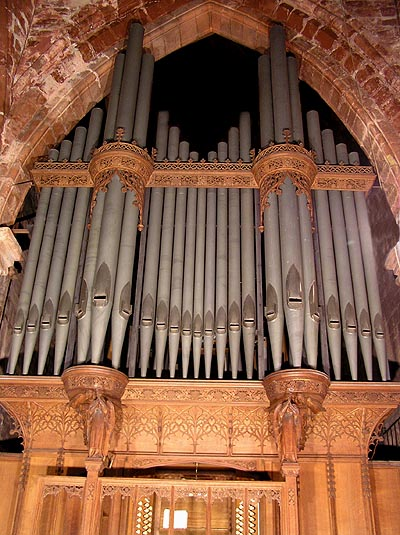
St Bees Priory organ built 1899; the last significant instrument he personally supervised and finished.

== Organist ==
Willis had a series of organist posts. In 1835 he became organist of Christ Church, Hoxton, and then St John-at-Hampstead from before the middle of 1852, then at Christ Church, Hampstead from 1852 to 1859, where he had built the organ, and then the Chapel-of-Ease, Islington (now St Mary Magdalene Church) for nearly thirty years until 1895.

== Family ==
He was born to Henry Willis (1792–1872) and Elizabeth. He married Esther Maria Chatterton (1817–1893), the daughter of Randall Chatterton, a silversmith, on 7 April 1847 in St Andrew's Church, Holborn and they had the following children

- Vincent Willis (1848–1928)
- Edith Willis (1850–1947)
- Henry Willis II (1852–1927)
- Kate Willis (1853–1927)
- Mary Willis (1859–1952)

Esther died in 1893 and on 7 August 1894 he married her younger sister, Rosetta Chatterton (1830–1912), at St Thomas' Church, Camden Town. As this was before the enactment of the Deceased Wife's Sister's Marriage Act 1907, it was in breach of the prohibition in the Marriage Act 1835.

== Legacy ==
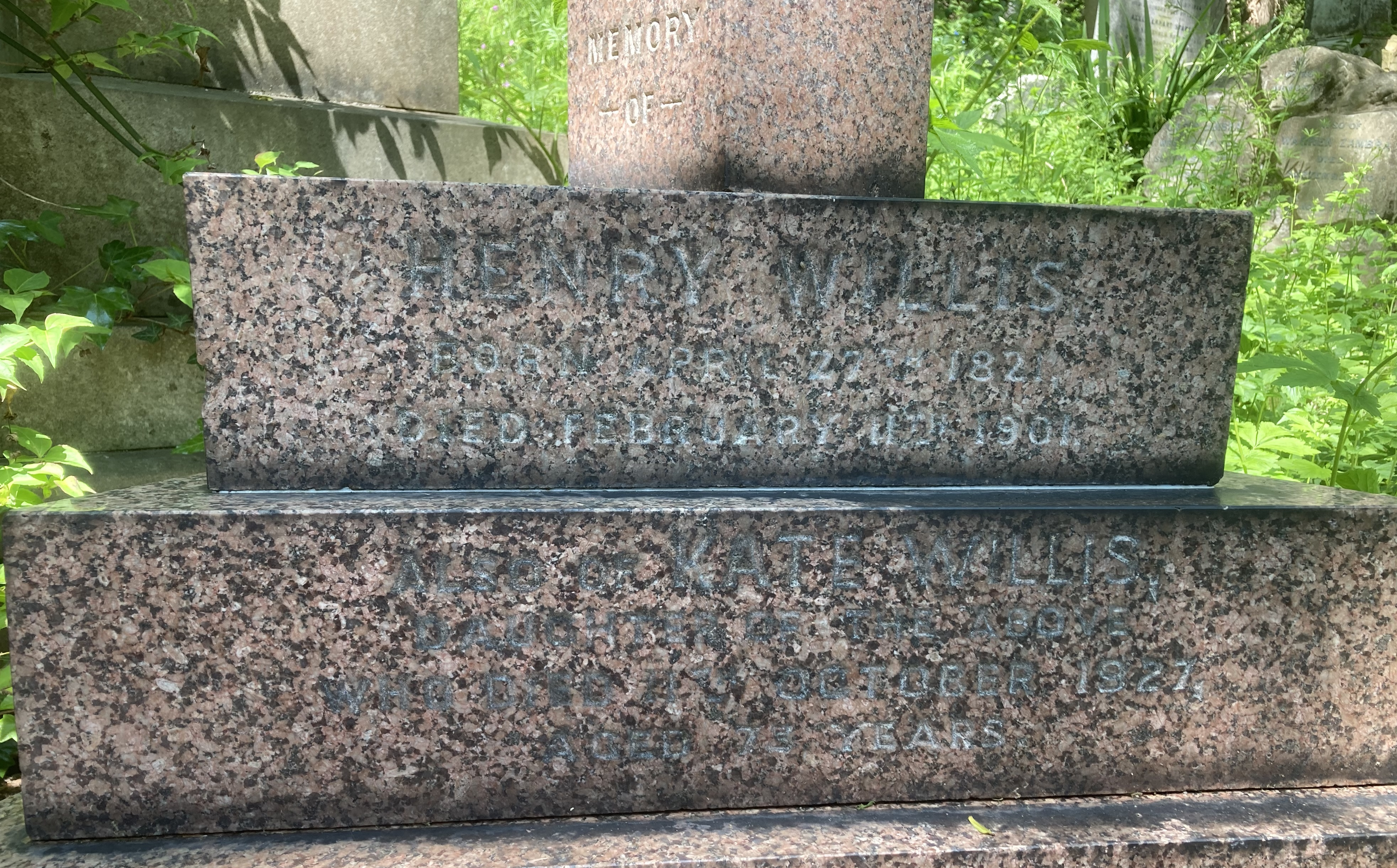
Grave of Henry Willis in Highgate Cemetery

Willis died in London on 11 February 1901, and is buried on the west side of Highgate Cemetery.

His instruments can be found across the world, particularly in the former British Empire, and his superb reed voicing and excellent mechanical craftmanship can still be experienced on many instruments today. The last organ built by Willis was at St Nicholas' Chapel, King's Lynn which is now under the care of the Churches Conservation Trust.

Four generations of the Willis family continued the family tradition of organ building until 1997, when Henry Willis IV retired and the first non-family Managing Director was appointed. On 28 November 1998 the total shareholding of the Willis family was acquired. The company, founded in 1845, Henry Willis & Sons, Ltd. still makes organs in Liverpool.

== Sources ==
- William Leslie Sumner (1973) The Organ, its evolution, principles of construction and use, MacDonald and Jane's, London ISBN 978-0-35604-162-9
