= Basil Maine =

English writer and music critic (1894–1972)

Basil Stephen Maine (4 March 1894 – 13 October 1972) was an English writer and critic on music, an organist, and later a priest. Among his writings are an early biography of Edward Elgar and Behold These Daniels (1928), a stylistic survey on the approaches of his music critic contemporaries.

== Life and career ==
Maine was born in Sheringham, Norfolk and educated at the City of Norwich School. At Cambridge he studied music with Edward Dent, Cyril Rootham and Charles Wood. During the war he taught for a while at Durnford School in Dorset, where his pupils included Ian Fleming and Peter Fleming. In the autumn of 1918 he was appointed assistant organist at Durham Cathedral, staying there until May 1919. Maine was a life member of the Royal College of Organists.

After that he shifted his career towards journalism, becoming music critic for newspapers such as The Spectator, The Daily Telegraph (from 1922), the Morning Post (1930) and the Sunday Times (1935–40). He was also an actor, public speaker and (from 1926) a broadcaster. In 1930 he was the orator in the first performance of Morning Heroes by Arthur Bliss at the Norwich Festival, and he also narrated in performances of Honegger's Le roi David and Stravinsky's The Soldier's Tale. He wrote some choral works for the Norwich Festival, including O Lord our Governor and Praise to God in 1936. Maine was ordained as a priest in 1939.

Maine wrote biography as well as music criticism. His early volume Behold these Daniels consists of 12 character sketches of critics (including the author) that originally appeared in Musical Times columns in 1926–7. The sketches include Ernest Newman, Edwin Evans, Robin Legge and H.C.Colles. The two-volume Elgar: his Life and Works, published a year before the subject's death, is his best-known work. Our Ambassador King is now a curiosity - a biography of King Edward VIII written before the abdication, with no mention of Mrs Simpson. The Best of Me, completed in 1937, is autobiographical and Twang with our Music (from 1957) is a collection of essays marking "the completion of 30 years' practice in the uncertain science of music criticism".

In the 1930s Maine lived at Stone Roof, Drax Avenue in Wimbledon. By 1950 his address was Warham Rectory, Wells-next-the-Sea in Norfolk.

== Selected writings ==
- Receive It So (1926)
- Behold These Daniels: Being Studies of Contemporary Music Critics. London: H. & W. Brown. 1928. OCLC 2763914.
- The Divisions of Music (as editor, 1930)
- Reflected Music and Other Essays (1930)
- Rondo (novel, 1930, dedicated to Anna May Wong)
- Plummer's Cut (novel, 1932)
- Elgar: his Life and Works (1933)
- Chopin (1933, second edition 1949)
- 'Paderewski' (in Great Contemporaries: Essays by Various Hands, 1935)
- Our Ambassador King (1936)
- The Best of Me: A Study in Autobiography (1937)
- The Glory of English Music (1937)
- Franklin Roosevelt His Life And Achievement (1938)
- People are Much Alike (autobiography, 1938)
- The BBC and its Audience (1939)
- New Paths in Music (1940)
- Basil Maine on Music (1945)
- Twang with our Music (1957)
