= Thomas Simpson Camidge =

Organist and composer

Thomas Simpson Camidge (2 February 1828 – 19 December 1913) was an organist and composer based in England.

== Life ==
He was born on 2 February 1828, the son of John Camidge, Organist of York Minster.

He was educated at St Peter's School, York, and at the Leipzig Conservatoire from 1846.

On 29 June 1852 he married Mary Catherine Norrison. His eldest son John Henry Norrison Camidge also became an organist.

He spent the last few years of his life in Oystermouth and died in Mumbles on 19 December 1913.

== Appointments ==
- Acting Organist of York Minster 1850 - 1859
- Organist of All Saints' Church, Pavement, York 1851 - 1856
- Organist of Christ Church, Swindon 1859 - 1864
- Organist of St. John's Church, Ousebridge, York 1865 - 1882
- Organist of Hexham Abbey 1882 - 1889
- Organist of Swindon Parish Church 1889 - 1890
- Organist of All Saints' Church, Swansea 1890 - 1899

== Compositions ==
His compositions include:

- Morning and Evening Services in A and C
- Three Anthems
- Twenty psalm chants

Preceded by John Camidge	Organist and Director of Music, York Minster; 1848 – 1859	Succeeded by Edwin George Monk
