= Walter Camidge =

English footballer

Personal information
- Full name: Walter Camidge
- Date of birth: 2 January 1912
- Place of birth: York, England
- Position: Inside right

Senior career*
Years	Team	Apps	(Gls)
	Dringhouses	?	(?)
1932–1933	York City	2	(0)
1933–1934	Scarborough	?	(?)
1934–1936	Peterborough United	69	(20)
- * Club domestic league appearances and goals

Walter Camidge (2 January 1912 – July 1987), also known as William A Camidge, was an English footballer.

He played for Dringhouses, York City, Scarborough and Peterborough United.
