= Langdon Colborne =

English cathedral organist

Langdon Colbourne (15 September 1835 – 16 September 1889) was an English cathedral organist, who served at Hereford Cathedral.

== Background ==
Colbourne was born in Hackney, London, the son of Thomas Colborne and Elizabeth Hobson. He was baptised at an independent (nonconformist) church in November 1835.

He studied organ under George Cooper. He died in Hereford in 1889 aged 54.

== Career ==
Organist of:

- St. Michael's College, Tenbury 1860–1874
- Beverley Minster 1874–1875
- Wigan Parish Church 1875–1877
- Dorking Parish Church 1877–1880
- Hereford Cathedral 1880-1889

Cultural offices
Preceded by John Stainer	Organist and Master of the Choristers of St. Michael's College, Tenbury; 1860-1874	Succeeded by Alfred Alexander
Preceded by G. J. Lambert	Organist and Master of the Choristers of Beverley Minster; 1874-1875	Succeeded by Arthur Henry Mann
Preceded by George Townshend Smith	Organist and Master of the Choristers of Hereford Cathedral; 1880-1889	Succeeded by George Robertson Sinclair
