= John Henry Norrison Camidge =

Composer and organist

John Henry Norrison Camidge (8 December 1853 – 22 September 1939) was a composer and organist based in Beverley, East Riding of Yorkshire.

== Life ==
He was born in 1853, the son of Thomas Simpson Camidge, and baptised in St. Michael-le-Belfrey on 5 January 1854.

He was a chorister at Christ Church Cathedral, Oxford. He matriculated in 1875.

He was appointed organist at Beverley Minster on 15 July 1876.

He was also music master at Beverley High School and conductor of the Beverley Choral Society.

He retired in 1933 but continued as Organist Emeritus until his death on 22 September 1939.

== Appointments ==
- Organist at Beverley Minster 1876–1933

== Compositions ==
He wrote:

- 2 Evening Services
- A dozen or so anthems
- Chants in the New Catholic Chant Book
- The Collegiate Psalter
