= William Camidge =

British solicitor and author

William Camidge F.R.H.S. (1828–1909) was a British solicitor and author based in York. He wrote histories of Methodism and a biography of the painter William Etty. He was a Royal Historical Society, and a Primitive Methodist associated with Elmfield College.

== Works ==
Among his publications are the following:

- 1893: The Life of Richard Naylor ... the last of the York Corporation Bellmen.
- 1908: Old local customs
- 1893: Ye old streete of Pavemente, York, etc.
- 1899: The Poet-Painter of York, William Etty, R. A. [With a portrait]
- 1896: York and its dukedom
- 1886: York Savings Bank. Its history, formation, and growth.
- Bedern and its chapel.
- Trades and tradesmen of the city of York.
- William Etty: the poet-painter
- A memorial of the late Mr John Webster.
- Bygone Yorkshire / edited by William Andrews.
- Centenary Chapel.
- Clifford's Tower, York: its history, age and use.
- Copmanthorpe: introduction of Methodism into the village.
- History of the Methodist New Connexion in York.
- In memoriam: Mr John Francis Taylor.
- In memoriam: Rev. Joshua Haigh; a tribute from his old friend Wm Camidge.
- In memoriam: Robert Woodruffe Holmes; a tribute of respect by.
- In memoriam: to the memory of Mr Johnson Frank, late of George Street, York.
- In memorian: Mr Henry Crossfield; a tribute from his old friend Mr Wm Camidge.
- In memorian: Mr Joseph Bass.
- In memorian: sketch of Mr Robert Robson Letby, given at the memorial service in Melbourne Terrace chapel ... Dec. 22nd, 1897; by.
- Jonathan Martin, the incendiary: his life, wanderings, and peculiar ideas. With some particulars of the fire at York Minster in February, 1829.
- Jonathan Martin, the incendiary.
- Lady Huntingdon's chapel, College Street, York.
- Methodism in Bishopthorpe : introduction and development /.
- Methodism in Fulford /.
- Methodism in Huntington.
- Methodism in Nun Monkton: its introduction and development.
- Methodism in York.
- Mother Shipton, the Yorkshire sybil: her life, character and reputed sayings.
- Old local customs: a review of the habits and doings of State, Church, Law and Festivals.
- Ouse Bridge to Naburn Lock / by.
- Peter Prison and the old bridges of the Ouse in the city of York / by Wm Camidge.
- Primitive Methodism: its introduction and development in the city of York.
- Ramparts, bars, and walls of York.
- Richard Naylor, otherwise Dicky Naylor, the last of the York Corporation bellmen.
- Rufforth in the Ainsty of the city of York: its ancient & modern history.
- Rufforth, in the ainsty of the city of York: its ancient & modern history.
- The Bedern or Bederne and its chapel: the home of the Vicars Choral of York Minster.
- The ghosts of York.
- The Guild Hall at York, with particulars of its stained glass windows.
- The guilds of York: the inception, growth, purpose & influence of the two surviving guilds, Merchant Adventurers and Merchant Taylors.
- The Life and character of Harry Rowe, trumpet major and high-sheriff's trumpeter for the county of York. On Harry Rowe.
- The life and labours of Mr Thomas Gent, historian and printer.
- The life and peculiarities of Lumley Kettlewell, the York recluse.
- The life of Richard Naylor, otherwise Dickey Naylor, the last of the York Corporation bellmen / by Wm Camidge.
- The life, times and crime of Guye Fawkes, the conspirator.
- The Mansion House at York, with particulars of its pictures and silver.
- The poet-painter of York: William Etty.
- Wesley Chapel, Priory Street / by W. Camidge.
- Wesleyan Methodist Conference, York, 1908; July 15–29. (165th yearly conference, held at Centenary Chapel, York.) Official programme... Compiled... by H.E. Harrowell. (- Methodism in York, by Wm Camidge.).
- William Etty, R.A., the poet-painter.
- Ye old streete of pavemente (York) / by W. Camidge.
- York : its ramparts, bars, and walls / by Wm Camidge.
- York and its dukedom.
- York Castle: criminal and other records; [comp. by?].
- York Ragged School: its inception and development.
- York Savings' Bank : Its history, formation, and growth / by, Secretary, York Savings' Bank.
- York Wesleyan Methodist Juvenile Missionary Society: history of its birth and growth.
- York, sixty years ago: a retrospect.
- York: as a war centre.
- York: Its Ramparts, Bars and Walls /, F.R.H.S.
- York: Parliamentary, Old time elections.

His papers are at York City Archives.
