= 2016 in classical music =

This article lists major events and other topics related to classical music in 2016.

== Events ==
- January 1 – The 75th anniversary Vienna New Year's Concert by the Vienna Philharmonic takes place at the Golden Hall of the Musikverein, conducted by Mariss Jansons.
- January 4 – The USA's National Symphony Orchestra announces the appointment of Gianandrea Noseda as its next music director, as of the 2017–2018 season, with an initial contract of 4 seasons.
- January 12 – Judge Sean H. Lane of the United States Bankruptcy Court for the Southern District of New York confirmed a reorganisation plan by NYCO Renaissance for revival of New York City Opera.
- January 13 – Chetham's School of Music announces the appointment of Alun Jones as its new Head, effective September 2016.
- January 14
  - Minnesota Opera announces the appointment of Ryan Taylor as its next president and general director, effective 1 May 2016, with an initial contract of 5 years.
  - Los Angeles Opera announces the appointment of Matthew Aucoin as its first-ever artist-in-residence, effective with the 2016–2017 season, with an initial term of 3 years.
- January 18
  - The Artemis String Quartet announces the appointment of Anthea Kreston as its new second violinist. In parallel, Gregor Sigl, the quartet's second violinist, immediately takes the position of violist of the quartet.
  - The Boise Philharmonic Orchestra announces that music director Robert Franz is to conclude his music directorship of the orchestra at the close of the 2015–2016 season.
- January 20
  - Friedrich Haider announces his resignation as chief conductor of the Slovak National Theatre.
  - The Berklee College of Music and the Boston Conservatory sign an agreement to merge under the umbrella name of 'Berklee', with the Boston Conservatory location to take the name 'The Boston Conservatory at Berklee'.
  - The Castleton Festival announces suspension of its 2016 summer festival season, citing financial difficulties.
  - NYCO Renaissance, the successor organisation to New York City Opera, gives its first performance, of Puccini's Tosca.
- January 21 – The Cypress String Quartet announces that it is to disband in the summer of 2016, after 20 years as an ensemble.
- January 26 – The Orkest van het Oosten announces that Jan Willem de Vriend is to conclude his tenure as chief conductor at the end of the 2016–2017 season.
- January 27
  - The Léonie Sonning Music Foundation announces Leonidas Kavakos as the recipient of the Léonie Sonning Music Prize 2017.
  - The New York Philharmonic announces the appointment of Jaap van Zweden as its next music director, effective with the 2018–2019 season, with an initial contract of 5 seasons.
  - The Dallas Symphony Orchestra announces that Jaap van Zweden is to conclude his music directorship of the orchestra after the 2017–2018 season, and subsequently to take the title of conductor laureate as of the 2018–2019 season, for a scheduled 3-season period.
- January 28
  - Wigmore Hall live-streams performances for the first time.
  - The Opera di Firenze announces the appointment of Fabio Luisi as its next music director, the first conductor to hold that title with the company, and in parallel, as director of the Maggio Musicale Fiorentino, as of April 2018, with an initial contract of 5 years. In parallel, Zubin Mehta, the company's principal conductor, is to take the title of principal conductor emeritus.
- January 29
  - The Ernst von Siemens Music Foundation announces Per Nørgård as the recipient of the 2016 Ernst von Siemens Music Prize.
  - Oxford University announces the appointment of Natalie Clein as Director of Musical Performance in the Music Faculty, with an initial term of 4 years.
- February 2 – The Utah Symphony announces the appointment of Paul Meecham as the next president and chief executive officer of Utah Symphony and Utah Opera.
- February 3 – The Boston Classical Orchestra board of trustees votes to file for bankruptcy. The orchestra subsequently cancels the remainder of its 2015–2016 season and ceases operations.
- February 4
  - The City of Birmingham Symphony Orchestra announces the appointment of Mirga Gražinytė-Tyla as its next music director, effective September 2016, with an initial contract of 3 years.
  - A New York Times report indicates that Fabio Luisi is to stand down from the post of principal conductor of the Metropolitan Opera after the 2016–2017 season.
- February 7 – Saint Thomas Church, New York City announces the appointment of Daniel Hyde as its next music director.
- February 8 – The Long Island Philharmonic announces immediate cessation of operations and closure of the orchestra.
- February 10
  - Decca Classics announces the appointment of Alexander Buhr as its next managing director.
  - The Ojai Music Festival announces the appointments of its next series of music directors through 2021: Vijay Iyer (2017 season), Esa-Pekka Salonen (2018 season), Barbara Hannigan (2019 season), Patricia Kopatchinskaja (2020 season), and Mitsuko Uchida (2021 season).
- February 11 – The NDR Symphony Orchestra announces that it is to change its name to the NDR Elbphilharmonie Orchester, as of 15 April 2016, as a reflection of its scheduled future residency in the new Elbphilharmonie concert hall in January 2017.
- February 15 – Vancouver Opera announces the appointment of Kim Gaynor as its next general director, effective 1 July 2016.
- February 18
  - The Tucson Symphony Orchestra announces the appointment of José Luis Gomez as its next music director, as of the 2017–2018 season.
  - Charles Dutoit conducts the Montreal Symphony Orchestra (OSM) in his first appearance with the OSM since his sudden 2002 resignation from the OSM music directorship.
- February 19 – The Royal Philharmonic Society announces Sir Peter Maxwell Davies as the recipient of its 102nd Gold Medal.
- February 24
  - Ian Bostridge is announced as the winner of the 60th Pol Roger Duff Cooper Prize for non-fiction writing, for his book Schubert's Winter Journey: Anatomy of an Obsession.
  - Opera North announces the appointment of Aleksandar Marković as its next music director, effective with the 2016–2017 season.
  - The London Mozart Players (LMP) announce the appointments of Nick Mallett as chair of the LMP Trust and of Julia Desbruslais as executive director of the LMP.
  - The Washington Chorus announces that Julian Wachner is to stand down as its music director after the 2016–2017 season.
- February 25 – The Ulster Orchestra announces the appointment of Richard Wigley as its new managing director, with immediate effect.
- February 26
  - The chorus of English National Opera have voted to take industrial action to protest proposed contract reductions.
  - The National Orchestra of Belgium announces the appointment of Hugh Wolff as its next music director, effective with the 2017–2018 season
  - The city of Bonn announces the appointment of Dirk Kaftan as the next Generalmusikdirektor of the Beethoven Orchester Bonn, effective August 2017, with an initial contract of 5 years.
- February 29 – The Berlin Philharmonic Orchestra announces that Martin Hoffmann is to stand down as Intendant (General Manager) of the orchestra after the end of the 2016–2017 season.
- March 1 – The Berlin Philharmonic Orchestra, the Konzerthausorchester Berlin, and the Staatskapelle Berlin jointly perform a free concert for newly arrived refugees and their helpers at the Philharmonie Berlin, under the banner of Willkommen in unserer Mitte ('Welcome among us'), under the patronage of German chancellor Angela Merkel.
- March 2
  - The Bridgewater Hall announces the appointment of Andrew Bolt as its new chief executive.
  - The Trondheim Symphony Orchestra announces the appointment of Han-na Chang as its next chief conductor, effective with the 2017–2018 season.
  - Piotr Anderszewski announces that he is taking an undefined sabbatical from performing. His final concert before the start of his sabbatical was on 4 March 2016 in New York City.
- March 4 – The Theater Nordhausen and Loh-Orchester Sondershausen announce the appointment of Michael Helmrath as their next Generalmusikdirektor (GMD), for 2 seasons, from the period of 2016–2018.
- March 9 – The Royal Opera House, Covent Garden announces the appointment of William Spaulding as its next chorus director, effective with the 2016–2017 season.
- March 10
  - The Birmingham Contemporary Music Group announces the appointment of Stephan Meier as its next artistic director, effective August 2016.
  - The Boston Symphony Orchestra announces the appointment of Thomas Adès as its first-ever Artistic Partner, for a period of 3 years commencing in August 2016.
- March 14 – Mid Wales Opera announces the appointments of Jonathan Lyness as its next music director, and of Richard Studer as its next artistic director, effective April 2017.
- March 15 – The Landeskapelle Eisenach announces the appointment of Andreas Fellner as its new chief conductor, effective with the 2016–2017 season.
- March 18 – The chorus of English National Opera (ENO) announced that its union, Equity, negotiated with ENO management a guaranteed annual pay package of £35,000, rather than the management-proposed reduction to £30,685. The ENO chorus subsequently did not resort to industrial action in protest at the earlier proposal, as had been decided on 26 February.
- March 21 – The Gloucester Cathedral Choir announces that it is to recruit girl choristers for the first time in its history, in April 2016.
- March 22 – Mark Wigglesworth announces his resignation as music director of English National Opera, effective at the end of the 2015–2016 season.
- March 24 – The Orchestre national de Lille announces the appointment of Alexandre Bloch as its new music director, effective with the 2016–2017 season.
- March 29 – Jeff Melanson resigns as president and chief executive officer (CEO) of the Toronto Symphony Orchestra (TSO). The orchestra announces that Sonia Baxendale is to be the TSO's interim CEO. Both actions are with immediate effect.
- April 5 – The Orchestre National de Lyon announces that Leonard Slatkin is to stand down as its music director after the 2016–2017 season, and subsequently to take the title of Directeur musical honoraire.
- April 13
  - The City of London Festival announces that it is ceasing operations.
  - NorrlandsOperan announces the appointment of Elim Chan as its next chief conductor, effective in 2017, with an initial contract of 3 years.
  - The Vienna Radio Symphony Orchestra announces that Cornelius Meister is to stand down as its chief conductor in 2018, at the end of his current contract.
- April 14 – The Metropolitan Opera announces that James Levine is to retire as its music director at the end of the 2015=2016 season, and subsequently to take the title of music director emeritus.
- April 18
  - The Royal Northern College of Music announces the appointment of Sir John Tomlinson as its next president, for a term of 5 years, effective January 2017.
  - The Göttingen Symphony Orchestra announces that Christoph-Mathias Mueller is to conclude his chief conductorship of the orchestra after the close of the 2017–2018 season.
- April 19
  - The city of Wuppertal announces the appointment of Julia Jones as the next general music director (Generalmusikdirektorin) of the Wuppertal Symphony Orchestra (Sinfonieorchesters Wuppertal), which also encompasses the music directorship of the Wuppertal Opera (Wuppertaler Bühnen), with an initial contract for 3 years, effective with the 2016–2017 season.
  - The RIAS Kammerchor announces the appointment of Justin Doyle as its next chief conductor and artistic director, effective with the 2017–2018 season.
- April 20 – The Scottish Chamber Orchestra announces the appointment of Gavin Reid as its next chief executive, effective 29 August 2016. In parallel, Reid is to stand down as director of the BBC Scottish Symphony Orchestra on 28 August 2016.
- April 23 – The London Woodwind Orchestra, the first professional woodwind orchestra in the UK, gives its debut performance at St John's Smith Square.
- April 29 – English National Opera announces the appointment of Daniel Kramer as its next artistic director, effective 1 August 2016.
- May 5 – The Bayerischer Rundfunk announces the appointment of Ivan Repušić as the next chief conductor of the Munich Radio Orchestra, effective in 2017.
- May 12 – The European Union Youth Orchestra announces that it is to cease operations as of 1 September 2016, because of a lack of financial support from the European Union.
- May 15 – Sheku Kanneh-Mason wins the 2016 BBC Young Musician of the Year award.
- May 17 – Itzhak Perlman announces via his Facebook page the cancellation of his scheduled 18 May 2016 appearance with the North Carolina Symphony, in protest at House Bill 2 (North Carolina General Assembly 2016 Second Extra Session).
- May 18
  - The Hessische Ministerium für Wissenschaft und Kunst announces the appointment of Patrick Lange as the next Generalmusikdirektor of the Staatstheater Wiesbaden, as of the 2017–2018 season.
  - San Francisco Opera announces that Nicola Luisotti is to conclude his music directorship of the company at the close of the 2017–2018 season.
- May 20 – Oliver Knussen receives The Queen's Medal for Music 2015, in a private audience with HRH Queen Elizabeth II.
- May 24
  - Sotheby's auctions a contract signed in 1829 by music editor Adolf Bernhard Marx and publisher Adolf Martin Schlesinger to publish Johann Sebastian Bach's St Matthew Passion.
  - Universal Classics USA announces the appointment of Graham Parker as its next president.
- May 25 – The Gothenburg Symphony Orchestra announces the appointment of Santtu-Matias Rouvali as its next chief conductor, effective with the 2017–2018 season, with an initial contract of 4 years.
- June 1 – The European Commission announces funding of 600K € for the European Union Youth Orchestra, as a short-term solution to prevent the pending closure of the orchestra.
- June 2
  - The Metropolitan Opera announces the appointment of Yannick Nézet-Séguin as its next music director, effective with the 2020–2021 season, with an initial contract of 5 seasons.
  - The Grand Rapids Symphony announces the appointment of Marcelo Lehninger as its next music director, effective with the 2016–2018 season, with an initial contract of 5 years.
- June 6 – The University of Cambridge announces the appointment of the Ligeti Quartet as the first holders of the Cambridge Chamber Music Residency.
- June 8 – The Tiroler Landestheater and the Innsbruck Symphony Orchestra announce that Francesco Angelico is to conclude his chief conductorship of both institutions after the 2016–2017 season.
- June 12 – Queen's Birthday Honours
  - Alison Balsom is awarded an Order of the British Empire (OBE).
  - Brian Lang, Colin Lawson, Paul Lewis, John McLeod are each made a Commander of the Order of the British Empire.
- June 13
  - Radio France announces the appointment of Emmanuel Krivine as the next music director of the Orchestre National de France, effective with the 2017–2018 season, with an initial contract of 3 years.
  - The Royal Albert Hall announces that Chris Cotton, its current chief executive, is to retire.
- June 15 – The Ministry of Science, Research and Art Baden-Württemberg announces the appointment of Cornelius Meister as the next Generalmusikdirektor (GMD) of the Stuttgart State Opera and of the Stuttgart State Orchestra, effective with the 2018–2019 season, with an initial contract of six seasons.
- June 23
  - The Mieczysła Karłowicz Philharmonic Orchestra announces the appointment of Rune Bergmann as its next artistic director and principal conductor, effective with the 2016–2017 season.
  - The Kennedy Center Honors announces its list of 2016 honorees, which includes Martha Argerich.
- June 24
  - Never heard during the composer's lifetime, Still Point by Daphne Oram receives its world premiere at St John's Smith Square, London, 67 years after Oram composed the work.
  - The Aix-en-Provence Festival announces the appointment of Pierre Audi as its next artistic director, effective 2018. In parallel, Audi is to stand down as artistic director of De Nederlandse Opera.
- June 26 – The Cypress String Quartet gives their final concert in San Francisco, at the Diane B. Wilsey Center for Opera, before formally disbanding.
- June 27 – Kentucky Opera announces the appointment of Ian Derrer as its new general director, effective 1 September 2016.
- June 29 – Opera de Montreal announces the appointment of Patrick Corrigan as its next general director, effective September 2016.
- June 30
  - Barbara Hannigan and Gerald Fagan are each appointed a Member of the Order of Canada.
  - The New Jersey Symphony Orchestra announces the appointment of Gabriel van Aalst as its new president and chief executive officer, effective October 2016.
- July 9 – The first complete performance of the Cello Concerto of Herbert Howells occurs at Gloucester Cathedral as part of the Cheltenham Festival.
- July 11 – The Calgary Philharmonic Orchestra announces the appointment of Rune Bergmann as its next music director, effective with the 2017–2018 season.
- July 13 – The Guildhall School of Music and Drama announces the appointment of Lynne Williams as its next principal, effective in 2017.
- July 17 – The SWR Sinfonieorchester Baden-Baden und Freiburg gives its final concert in Freiburg, before its scheduled merger with the Stuttgart Radio Symphony Orchestra.
- July 26 – The Konstanzer Gemeinderat announces the appointment of Ari Rasilainen as the next chief conductor of the Südwestdeutschen Philharmonie, effective with the 206–2017 season, with an initial contract of 5 years.
- July 28 – The Stuttgart Radio Symphony Orchestra gives its final concert in London at the Royal Albert Hall as part of The Proms, before its scheduled merger with the SWR Sinfonieorchester Baden-Baden und Freiburg.
- August 2 – The BBC Scottish Symphony Orchestra announces the appointment of Dominic Parker as its new director, in succession to Gavin Reid.
- August 18
  - The Finnish National Opera and Ballet announces the appointment of Esa-Pekka Salonen as its first-ever artist in association, for the period from September 2016 to 2021.
  - The Toronto Symphony Orchestra announces the appointment of Gary Hanson as its interim chief executive officer, effective 26 September 2016, with a contract of up to 2 years.
- August 23 – The Rotterdam Philharmonic Orchestra announces the appointment of Lahav Shani as its next chief conductor, effective with the 2018–2019 season, with an initial contract of 5 years.
- September 7 – Never publicly performed during the composer's lifetime, the BBC Philharmonic gave the premiere of the Symphony No 6 of Arnold Cooke at the BBC Philharmonic Studio, MediaCityUK, in Salford Quays.
- September 8 – The musicians of the Fort Worth Symphony Orchestra take industrial action and go on strike, following a breakdown in contract negotiations between the orchestra's management and musicians.
- September 9
  - The Filarmonica Arturo Toscanini announces the appointment of Alpesh Chauhan as its next principal conductor, effective September 2017.
  - The Cabrillo Festival of Contemporary Music announces the appointment of Cristian Măcelaru as its new music director, with immediate effect.
- September 12
  - The Royal Opera House, Covent Garden announces the appointment of Oliver Mears as its next Director of Opera, effective March 2017.
  - The Colorado Symphony announces the appointment of Brett Mitchell as its next music director, effective with the 2017–2018 season, with an initial contract of 4 years.
- September 16 – The Deutsche Radio Philharmonie Saarbrücken Kaiserslautern announces the appointment of Pietari Inkinen as its next chief conductor, effective with the 2017–2018 season, with an initial contract of 4 years.
- September 22
  - The Seoul Philharmonic Orchestra announces the appointments of Thierry Fischer as principal guest conductor and of Markus Stenz as 'conductor-in-residence', both effective January 2017, with initial contracts of 3 years, following the resignation of Myung-whun Chung as music director of the orchestra at the end of 2015.
  - The SWR Symphonieorchester, formed from the merger of the SWR Sinfonieorchester Baden-Baden und Freiburg and the Stuttgart Radio Symphony Orchestra, gives its first concert at the Liederhalle, Stuttgart, under the direction of Péter Eötvös.
- September 27 – The San Francisco Symphony announces that Brent Assink is to stand down as the orchestra's executive director in 2017.
- September 30
  - The musicians of the Pittsburgh Symphony Orchestra take industrial action and go on strike, for only the second time in the orchestra's history.
  - The musicians of the Philadelphia Orchestra take industrial action and go on strike, one hour before its scheduled Opening Night Gala concert.
  - The management of the Montevideo Philharmonic Orchestra informed its musicians of the appointment of Ligia Amadio as its next artistic director, effective 2017. The orchestra formally announced Amadio's appointment on 23 December 2016.
- October 1 – The Tokyo Philharmonic Orchestra announces the appointment of Andrea Battistoni as its new chief conductor, with immediate effect.
- October 2 – The musicians of the Philadelphia Orchestra vote 73–11 to ratify a new contract proposed by orchestra management, ending the industrial action initiated on 30 September.
- October 5
  - The Juilliard School announces that its current president, Joseph Polisi, is to stand down from the post in June 2018.
  - Five former members of the Hilliard Ensemble reunite for a benefit concert for Music for Open Ears, in London at St Paul's Church, Covent Garden.
- October 6
  - The Berlin Philharmonic Orchestra announces the appointment of Andrea Zietzschmann as its new Intendantin (managing director), effective 1 September 2017.
  - Les Violons du Roy announces the appointment of Jonathan Cohen as its next music director, effective with the 2017–2018 season.
- October 18
  - The Konzerthaus Orchestra Berlin announces that Ivan Fischer is to conclude his tenure as its chief conductor after the end of the 2017–2018 season.
  - The Orchestre symphonique de l'Estuaire announces the appointment of Dina Gilbert as its next music director, effective June 2017.
- October 20 – The Victoria Symphony announces the appointment of Christian Kluxen as its next music director, effective with the 2017–2018 season, with an initial contract of 4 years.
- October 21
  - English National Opera announces the appointment of Martyn Brabbins as its new music director, with immediate effect, with an initial contract through October 2020.
  - The Cincinnati May Festival announces the appointment of Juanjo Mena as its new principal conductor, effective with the 2017–2018 season, with an initial contract of 3 years.
- October 24 – The Royal Albert Hall announces the appointment of Craig Hassall as its next chief executive, effective 2017.
- October 25 – Originally completed in 1997, the opera Jane Eyre by composer John Joubert and librettist Kenneth Birkin received its world premiere in a revised version in 2 acts, at the Ruddock Performing Arts Centre, Birmingham.
- October 26
  - The Interlochen Center for the Arts announces the appointment of Trey Devey as its next president, effective June 2017.
  - The Cincinnati Symphony Orchestra announces that Trey Devey is to stand down as its president in April 2017.
- October 29 – The Elbland Philharmonie Sachsen announces the appointment of Ekkehard Klemm as its next chief conductor, effective with the 2017–2018 season.
- November 3 – The Basque National Orchestra announces the appointment of Robert Treviño as its next music director, effective with the 2017–2018 season, with an initial contract of 3 seasons.
- November 4 – The UK government announced withdrawal of funding support for the proposed new London Concert Hall.
- November 15 – The Australian Festival of Chamber Music announces the appointment of Kathryn Stott as its next artistic director, effective in 2018, with an initial contract of 3 years.
- November 18 – Michigan Opera Theatre announces the appointment of Stephen Lord to the newly created position of principal conductor, with an initial contract through the 2018–2019 season, with immediate effect.
- November 23 – The Pittsburgh Symphony Orchestra announces the ratification of a 5-year agreement by the orchestra musicians, ending their industrial action.
- November 25 – The Royal Danish Opera (Det Kongelige Kapel) announces the appointment of Alexander Vedernikov as its next chief conductor, effective with the 2017–2018 season.
- November 27 – In a letter to the mayor of Dresden, Michael Sanderling announces that he is to stand down as chief conductor of the Dresden Philharmonic after the end of his current contract in 2019, in protest at learning of proposed culture budget reductions via media reports instead of being informed directly from the civic authorities.
- November 28 – The Grawemeyer Foundation announces Andrew Norman as the winner of the 2017 Grawemeyer Award for Music Composition, for his orchestral work Play.
- November 29 – The autograph manuscript of the Symphony No. 2 of Gustav Mahler is sold at Sotheby's (London) for £4,546,250.
- December 1 – The Metropolitan Opera gives its first performance of L'Amour de loin of Kaija Saariaho, the first opera by a female composer to be staged at the Metropolitan Opera since 1903, and the second opera by a female composer ever to be presented in the history of the company.
- December 2 – At the Mariinsky Theatre in St Petersburg, the Mariinsky Theatre Orchestra, conducted by Valery Gergiev, gave the second-ever performance of Pogrebal'naya Pesnya (Funeral Song) by Igor Stravinsky, following the rediscovery of the work in 2015.
- December 6 – The Staatstheater am Gärtnerplatz announces the appointment of Anthony Bramall as its next chief conductor, effective with the 2017–2018 season.
- December 7
  - Northern Ireland Opera announces the appointment of Walter Sutcliffe as its next artistic director, effective February 2017.
  - The musicians of the Fort Worth Symphony Orchestra approved a new labour agreement with the orchestra's management, contracted through 2020, after an anonymous donor made a gift of US$700K toward musician salaries.
- December 8
  - Dmitri Hvorostovsky announces that he is withdrawing from all of his currently scheduled opera performances 'for the foreseeable future', because of health concerns, to focus on concert and recital work, and health treatment.
  - The Barenboim–Said Akademie opens in Berlin.
- December 10 – The Metropolitan Opera presents L'Amour de loin, by Kaija Saariaho, as part of the Metropolitan Opera Live in HD series to cinemas, the first opera by a female composer, and the first opera conducted by a female conductor (Susanna Mälkki), in the series.
- December 12 – The San Francisco Symphony announces that it is cancelling its scheduled April 2017 concert appearances in Chapel Hill, North Carolina, USA, in protest at House Bill 2 (North Carolina General Assembly 2016 Second Extra Session).
- December 13 – The Queen's Hall, Edinburgh announces that its chief executive, Adrian Harris, is to retire at the end of December 2016.
- December 19
  - The Mozarteum Orchestra Salzburg announces the appointment of Riccardo Minasi as its next chief conductor, effective September 2017.
  - The Württembergische Philharmonie Reutlingen announces the appointment of Fawzi Haimor as its next chief conductor, effective with the 2017–2018 season, with an initial contract of 3 years.
- December 20 – The St. Louis Symphony announces that David Robertson is to conclude his tenure as its music director at the end of the 2018–2019 season.
- December 21 – The Austrian Ministry of Culture simultaneously announced that Dominique Meyer is to conclude his tenure as general director (Intendant) of the Vienna State Opera at the end of the 2019–2020 season, and that Bogdan Roscic is to be the new Intendant of the Vienna State Opera effective with the 2020–2021 season.
- December 23 – The Philharmonia Orchestra announces the appointment of Helen Sprott as its new managing director, effective April 2017.
- December 26 — The Israel Philharmonic Orchestra announces that Zubin Mehta is to stand down as its music director as of October 2019.
- December 29 – The Orquesta de Cámara de Valdivia announces the appointment of Emmanuele Baldini as its new music director, effective in 2017.
- December 30
  - New Year's Honours 2017
    - Dame Evelyn Glennie is made a Companion of Honour.
    - Jeffrey Tate and Bryn Terfel are each made a Knight Bachelor.
    - Lennox Mackenzie and Stephen Maddock are each made an Officer of the Order of the British Empire.
    - Iestyn Davies and Anthony Forbes are each made a Member of the Order of the British Empire.
  - Order of Canada
    - Russell Braun and Howard Shore are each appointed an Officer of the Order of Canada.
    - Michael Schade receives an honorary appointment as an Officer of the Order of Canada.

== New works ==
The following composers' works were composed, premiered, or published this year, as noted in the citation.

=== A ===
- Hans Abrahamsen – Left, alone for piano left hand and orchestra
- John Adams – Roll Over Beethoven
- Samuel Carl Adams
  - for jenny
  - Quartet Movement
- Julia Adolphe – Unearth, Release (viola concerto)
- Iddo Aharony – ...the way nets cannot hold water
- Julian Anderson – Incantesimi
- Timo Andres
  - Winding Stair
  - Small Wonder as a member of Sleeping Giant composers' collective work Ash
- Matthew Aucoin
  - Merrill Songs
  - resolve
- Lera Auerbach – The Infant Minstrel and His Peculiar Menagerie
- Lawrence Axelrod – 'From the Shore'

=== B ===
- Drew Baker – NOX
- Richard Baker – Hwyl fawr ffrindiau
- Michael Bakrnčev – Sky Jammer
- Marcos Balter – Divertimento Concertante
- Patricia Barber – Angels, Birds, and I
- Jean-Baptiste Barrière – Palimpsest Capriccio'
- Sally Beamish
  - Chaconne (for organ)
  - A Shakespeare Masque (text by Carol Ann Duffy)
  - Merula perpetua
  - Piano Concerto No 2 ('Cauldron of the Speckled Seas')
- Luke Bedford
  - Three Caves
  - In Black Bright Ink
- Franck Bedrossian – Twist for orchestra and electronics
- Lembit Beecher – Limestone
- Michael Berkeley – Violin Concerto (in memoriam D.R.)
- Derek Bermel – Twenty Questions
- Lisa Bielawa – Vireo Caprice'
- Judith Bingham – The Orchid and Its Hunters
- Harrison Birtwistle – Five Lessons in a Frame
- Daniel Bjarnason – First Escape'
- Olivia Block – Lazarus
- Darren Bloom – Dr Glaser's Experiment
- William Bolcom – Trombone Concerto
- Mark David Boden – Ghyll
- Seth Boustead – 'Chicago Song'
- Charlotte Bray
  - Agnus Dei
  - Stone Dancer
  - Falling in the Fire (for cello and orchestra)
- John Wolf Brennan – Dädaleum for vocalists and chamber orchestra
- Joey Brink – Letters from the Sky
- Eliza Brown – A Soundwalk with Resi
- Michael Brown – Surfaces
- David Bruce – Marzipan
- Courtney Bryan – Yet Unheard
- Diana Burrell – Concerto for Brass and Orchestra

=== C ===
- Jay Capperauld – Fèin-Aithne
- Paul Carr – Violin Concerto
- Joshua Cerdenia – Spoliarium
- Friedrich Cerha – Sechs Postludien (composed 2014)
- Christopher Cerrone
  - Shall I Project A World?
  - On Being Wrong as a member of Sleeping Giant composers' collective work Ash
- Anthony Cheung – Character Studies'
- Bob Chilcott – My Perfect Stranger
- Pablo Santiago Chin – (in)armonia: retratos I
- Chiu-yu Chou – Tongue
- Carlo Ciceri -šìr
- Seán Clancy – Seven Lines of Music Slow Down and Eventually Stop
- Joe Clark – not merely bad or broken
- Desmond Clarke
  - Viola Concerto
  - Xyla
- Anna Clyne – This Lunar Beauty
- Francisco Coll
  - Chanson et Bagatelle
  - Ceci n'est pas un Concerto
- Jacob Cooper – 'Ley Lines' as a member of Sleeping Giant composers' collective work Ash
- Ronald Corp – "Behold, the sea"
- Tom Coult
  - Sonnet Machine
  - Spirit of the Staircase
- Laurence Crane – Cobbled Section After Cobbled Section

=== D ===
- Richard Danielpour – The Wounded Healer (percussion concerto)
- Jean-Luc Darbellay
  - Miroirs (for solo cello)
  - Nocturne (for piano and string quartet)
- Joseph Davies – The Shortest Day
- Brett Dean – From Melodious Lay (A Hamlet Diffraction)
- Stephen Deazley (music) and Martin Riley (text) – The Rattler
- Donnacha Dennehy: Tessellatum
- Bryce Dessner – Gift'
- Zosha Di Castri – Patina'
- James Dillon – The Gates for string quartet and orchestra
- Stylianos Dimou – Metallics
- Jonathan Dove – Catching Fire
- Richard Dubugnon – Piano Concerto

=== E ===
- Aurélio Edler-Copes – Presence
- Nomi Epstein – for Collect/Project
- Richard Emsley – Strange Attractor
- Reena Esmail – Avartan for Orchestra and Video
- Ēriks Ešenvalds – Infelix ego

=== F ===
- David Fennessy – Panopticon
- Augustin Fernandez – Rio Bravo
- Edmund Finnis – Parallel Colour
- Alissa Firsova
  - Paradisi Gloria
  - Bride of the Wind
- Johannes Fischer – Canons and Sparrows
- Chris Fisher-Lochhead – stutter-step the concept
- Cheryl Frances-Hoad – Game On (for piano and Commodore 64)
- Ryan Francis – Anthem (for violin and electronics)
- Paul Frehner (music) and Peter Mettler (video images) – From the Vortex Perspective

=== G ===
- Fredrick Gifford – MOBILE 2016 (Shadow play)
- Jeremy Gill – Serenada Concertante for Oboe and Orchestra
- Dan Gillingwater – Overture Ad Fontem
- Kathleen Ginther – Lake Effect
- Philip Glass – Sarabande in Common Time'
- Michael Gordon – kwerk'
- Michael Zev Gordon – In the Middle of Things
- Pierce Gradone – To Paint Their Madness
- Philip Grange – Shifting Thresholds
- Sally Greenaway – Worlds Within Worlds
- Mark Grey – Twenty
- Helen Grime – Two Eardley Pictures
- Pelle Gudmundsen-Holmgreen – Ad cor

=== H ===
- Georg Friedrich Haas – Concerto for trombone and orchestra
- Saad Haddad
  - Manarah
  - Takht
- Cristóbal Halffter – String Quartet No. 9 ("In memoriam Miguel de Cervantes")
- John Harbison – Painting The Floors Blue
- Tom Harrold
  - Nightfires
  - Raze
- Malcolm Hayes – Violin Concerto
- Morgan Hayes – Overture: The Kiss
- Will Healy – Kolmanskop
- Ted Hearne – 'DaVZ23BzMH0' as a member of Sleeping Giant composers' collective work Ash
- David Philip Hefti – Poème noctambule
- Piers Hellawell – Wild Flow
- Wim Henderickx – Blossomings
- David Hertzberg – Sunday Morning
- Markus Hofer – Duo
- Robin Holloway – Chorale Prelude on 'Alle Menschen Müssen Sterben'
- Robert Honstein – 'Orison' as a member of Sleeping Giant composers' collective work Ash
- Dani Howard – Ostara (for clarinet, cello and piano)
- Emily Howard
  - Chaos or Chess
  - Torus (Concerto for Orchestra)
- Andrew Hsu – Vale
- Huang Ruo – THE SONIC GREAT WALL
- Francisco Huguet – La flor mas rara
- Jessica A. Hunt – Colloquy
- Thomas Hyde – Piano Trio: after Picasso

=== I ===
- Vijay Iyer – Zany, Cute, Interesting

=== J ===
- Martin Jaggi – Caral for orchestra
- Christopher Wendell Jones – Plastic Moment
- Patrick John Jones – Locks of the approaching storm

=== K ===
- Gabriel Kahane – The Single Art Form Is Dead
- Daniel Kidane – Sirens
- Marc Kilchenmann – apeiron
- Phil Kline – Bedeviled
- Tonia Ko
  - Games of Belief
  - Strange Sounds and Explosions Worldwide
- Hans Koller – Twelve Re-inventions for George Russell
- Catherine Kontz – Fruitmarket
- Olli Kortekangas – Migrations
- Franck Krawczyk – Après
- Larysa Kuzmenko (music) and Talia Zajac (text) – Golden Harvest

=== L ===
- Alexander L'Estrange – Show me, deare Christ
- David Lang
  - low resolution'
  - the public domain
- Vivian Lash
  - Music for Eight Lungs
  - Six Etudes and a Dream
- Kevin Lau – Concerto Grosso for Orchestra, String Quartet, and Turntables
- Jonathan Leshnoff – Clarinet Concerto ('Nekudim')
- Mica Levi – Signal Before War
- Gideon Lewensohn – Movements and Gestures (for clarinet and string quartet)
- George Lewis – String Quartet 1.5: Experiments in Living
- Sarah Lianne Lewis – Altissimum planetam tergeminum observavi
- Yuan-Chen Li – 'Mist'
- Christian Lindberg
  - Robot Gardens
  - Liverpool Lullabies
- Magnus Lindberg – Two Episodes
- David T. Little
  - Ghostlight
  - dress in magic amulets, dark, from My feet
- Hope Littwin – A Lullaby for the Tender Hearted in the Age of Anxiety
- Loren Loiacono – Waxing Cerulean
- David Ludwig – Moto Perpetuo

=== M ===
- Clare Maclean – 'That I Did Always Love'
- James MacMillan – Stabat Mater
- Eric Malmquist – Prairie Music
- Kevin Malone – Unsung HerStories
- Sasha Johnson Manning – Miss Me, But Let Me Go
- Wynton Marsalis – The Jungle (Symphony No 4)
- Barnaby Martin – Shine Forth
- Zoë Martlew – Broad St. Burlesque
- Benedict Mason – Horns Strings and Harmony
- Christian Mason
  - Isolarion III
  - In the Midst of the Sonorous Islands
- James Matheson – Capriccio
- David Matthews – Norfolk March
- Missy Mazzoli – Kinski Paganini
- Andrew McIntosh
  - Five Songs
  - We See the Flying Bird
- Andrew McManus – the has-been to beachey
- Harold Meltzer – Vision Machine
- Anna Meredith – Tripotage Miniatures
- David Mettens – Tangled lines, luminous tangents
- Janice Misurell-Mitchell – Clameurs, Mélodie
- Philip Moore – Requiem
- Paul Moravec – Concertante for violin, cello, oboe and bassoon
- Jocelyn Morlock – Undark
- Jan W Morthenson – Omega for orchestra
- Jeffrey Mumford – Three Windows (texts by Sonia Sanchez)
- Tim Munro – breath

=== N ===
- Eric Nathan – Far Beyond Far'
- Marc Neikrug – Flash
- Andrew Norman
  - Still Life
  - For Ashley as a member of Sleeping Giant composers' collective work Ash
- Bayan Northcott – Concerto for Orchestra
- Michael Nyman – Two Sonnets of Sor Juana Ines de la Cruz

=== O ===
- Carolyn O'Brien – Plectra
- Elizabeth Ogonek – Sleep & Unremembrance
- Scott Ordway – Tonight We Tell the Secrets of the World

=== P ===
- Timothy Page – 'Fences'
- Mario Pagliarani – Mozartmaschine und Luftkadenz
- Ben Palmer – Flying in the Fire
- Roxanna Panufnik – Kyrie after Byrd
- Owain Park – Upheld by stillness
- Aaron Parker – After sunset fades
- Jeff Parker – Water on Glass
- Anthony Payne – Of Land, Sea and Sky
- Michael Pelzel – Concerto for Contrabass Clarinet
- Krzysztof Penderecki – String Quartet No 4
- Joseph Phibbs – Partita
- John Pickard – Symphony No 5
- Tobias Picker – Opera without Words
- Michael Pisaro – fields have ears (10)
- Sophya Polevaya – Carousel
- Francis Pott – Laudate Dominum
- John Powell – A Prussian Requiem
- Paola Prestini (music) and Royce Vavrek (librettist) – The Hubble Cantata
- Alwynne Pritchard – Rockaby
- Gene Pritsker – Spirits
- Ryan Probert – Mattei
- Hilary Purrington – For your judicious and pious consideration

=== R ===
- Shulamit Ran – Birkat Haderekh – Blessing for the Road II
- Alexander Raskatov – Green Mass
- Santa Ratniece – My soul will sink into you
- William Jason Raynovich – how dark and single
- Steve Reich – Pulse
- Tomeka Reid – Prospective Dwellers
- David Reminick – Seven Somniloquies
- Wolfgang Rihm – Toccata capricciosa
- Sarah J. Ritch – Dirge
- Enric Riu – From Freigeld to the Bitcoin
- Derek Rodgers – Clarinet Concerto
- Ana-Maria Rodriguez – Les miroirs
- Matt Rogers – We Happened to Travel
- Christopher Rountree – because I left it there'
- Christopher Rouse – Organ Concerto
- Roberto David Rusconi – Rituale
- Peter Ruzicka – Elegie
- Alexandre Rydin – Psaume 61

=== S ===
- Kaija Saariaho – Sense
- Tomás I. Gueglio Saccone – Invention – Music for Bells
- Jorge Sánchez-Chiong – Concerto for Contrabass Clarinet, Turntable, E-Guitar and Videotechnician
- Mehmet Ali Sanlıkol – Harabat / The Intoxicated
- Igor Santos – études
- David Sawer – April\March
- Klaus Schedl – Blutrausch for orchestra and electronics
- Adam Schoenberg – Tres Mujeres (texts by Janine Salinas Schoenberg)
- Alfred Schweizer – Musik für Klavier zu vier Händen und Streicher (Piano Music for Four Hands and Strings)
- Frederick Scott – Toccata seconda
- Caroline Shaw – To the Hands
- Jack Sheen – Lung
- Sean Shepherd – wideOPENwide
- Percy Sherwood – Concerto for Violin and Cello
- Aleksandr Shymko – Cello concerto
- Mark Simpson – Hommage à Kurtág
- Noam Sivan – Concentrated Stillness'
- Howard Skempton – Piano Concerto
- Sleeping Giant (composers' collective; individual composers and works listed below): Ash
  - Timo Andres – 'Small Wonder'
  - Christopher Cerrone – 'On Being Wrong'
  - Jacob Cooper – 'Ley Lines'
  - Ted Hearne – 'DaVZ23BzMH0'
  - Robert Honstein – 'Orison'
  - Andrew Norman – 'For Ashley'
- Samuel Smith – interior cities
- Lewis Spratlan – Common Ground
- Will Stackpole – Aft Agley
- Christopher Stark
  - Nanoconcerto 2
  - Winter Music
  - Spring Music
  - Horizon
- Joe Steele – from different countries
- Steven Stucky – The Music of Light
- Martin Suckling – Piano Concerto
- Iris Szeghy – It-Movements

=== T ===
- Michael Taplin – Lambent fires
- Iris ter Schiphorst – Gravitational Waves
- Third Coast Percussion – Reaction Yield
- Hans Thomalla
  - Bagatellen
  - I come near you
- Augusta Read Thomas – Venus Enchanted'
- Anna Thorvaldsdottir – Ad Genua/To the knees
- Francisco Castillo Trigueros – En la orilla gris, silencio
- Alex Turley – City of Ghosts
- Mark-Anthony Turnage – Strapless (ballet in one act, choreography by Christopher Wheeldon)

=== U ===
- Sohrab Uduman – Dann klingt es auf...

=== V ===
- Cathy van Eck – 412 Meter laufen
- Pēteris Vasks – Viola Concerto
- Ian Venables – Through these pale cold days
- Carl Vine – Five Hallucinations (for trombone and orchestra)
- Kevin Volans
  - String Quartet No. 12
  - Piano Concerto No. 4

=== W ===
- Rolf Wallin – Swans Kissing (string quartet)
- Anne Wang – Quartered
- Huw Watkins – Cello Concerto
- Randall West – Copper
- Nina Whiteman – The map of days outworn
- Adrian Williams – Piano Trio
- Roderick Williams – Ave verum corpus re-imagined
- René Wohlhauser – Une Nuit toute passionée
- Julia Wolfe – Spinning Jenny
- John Woolrich – Swan Song
- Maurice Wright – Resounding Drums (concerto for timpani and orchestra)
- Amy Wurtz – Songs and Dances

=== Y ===
- Katherine Young – the moss glows and the water is black
- Kemal Yusuf – Cain

== New operas ==
- Thomas Adès and Tom Cairns – The Exterminating Angel
- Robert Aldridge and Herschel Garfein – Sister Carrie
- Gerald Barry – Alice's Adventures Under Ground.
- Iain Bell (music), David Antrobus and Emma Jenkins (libretto) – In Parenthesis
- Konrad Boehmer and Albert Ostermaier – Sensor
- David Bruce and Glyn Maxwell – Nothing
- Anthony Davis and Richard Wesley – Five
- Avner Dorman and Lutz Huebner and Sarah Nemitz – Wahnfried.
- Du Yun and Royce Vavrek: Angel's Bone
- Emily Hall – Found and Lost
- Jake Heggie and Gene Scheer – It's a Wonderful Life
- Ingfried Hoffmann – Die Heinzelmännchen zu Köln
- Toshio Hosokawa and Hannah Duebgen – Stilles Meer
- Nicholas Jackson – The Rose and the Ring
- Hannah Kendall and Tessa McWatt – The Knife of Dawn
- Lori Laitman and David Mason – The Scarlet Letter
- David Lang and Mark Dion – anatomy theater
- Elena Langer and David Pountney – Figaro Gets a Divorce
- David T. Little and Royce Vavrek – JFK
- Evan Mack and Joshua McGuire – Roscoe
- Stuart MacRae and Louise Welsh – The Devil Inside
- Kevin Malone – Mysterious 44 (complete)
- Kevin March and Michel Marc Bouchard – Les Feluettes
- Sir Peter Maxwell Davies – The Hogboon
- Missy Mazzoli and Royce Vavrek – Breaking the Waves
- Paul Moravec and Mark Campbell – The Shining
- Alasdair Nicolson and John Gallas – The Iris Murder
- Jack Perla and Rajiv Joseph – Shalimar the Clown
- Kaija Saariaho – Only The Sound Remains (Always Strong and Feather Mantle)
- Bright Sheng and David Henry Hwang – Dream of the Red Chamber
- Mark Simpson and Melanie Challenger – Pleasure
- Gregory Spears and Greg Pierce – Fellow Travelers
- Miroslav Srnka and Tom Holloway – South Pole
- Oscar Strasnoy Comeback at Staatsoper Berlin Unter den Linden
- Philip Sunderland and Gareth Prior – The Glass Knight
- Peter Anthony Togni and Sharon Singer – Isis and Osiris
- Eicca Toppinen and Perttu Kivilaakso (music), Sami Parkkinen (libretto) - Indigo
- Jacob TV (Jacob ter Veldhuis) – The News
- Michel van der Aa – Blank Out
- Philip Venables – 4.48 Psychosis
- Rolf Wallin and Mark Ravenhill – Elysium
- Gareth Williams and Anna Chatterton – Rocking Horse Winner
- Luna Pearl Woolf and Caitlin Vincent: Better Gods

== Albums ==
- Alfred Brendel. The Complete Philips Recordings
- Walter Braunfels
  - Don Juan, Symphonic Variations
  - Orchestral Songs, Volume 2
- Wolfgang Rihm – Two Other Movements; Abkehr; Schattenstück
- Hans Abrahamsen – let me tell you
- Spektral Quartet – Serious Business
- Brett Dean, Ross Edwards, Peter Sculthorpe – Amy Dickson (saxophone), Island Songs
- Robert De Visée – Intimité et grandeur
- Anders Hillborg – Sirens, Cold Heat;, Beast Sampler
- Elena Langer – Landscape with Three People
- Francis Chagrin – Symphonies Nos 1 and 2
- Louise Farrenc, Germaine Tailleferre, Pauline Viardot, Lili Boulanger, Mélanie Bonis, Claude Arrieu – Liberté, Égalité, Sororité
- Gabriel Kahane – The Fiction Issue
- Giacinto Scelsi – Complete Flute Music
- Scherben – Ensemble musikFabrik: Jonathan Harvey, Sringara Chaconne; Kaija Saariaho, Notes on Light; Nonne Poppe, Scherben; Emmanuel Nunes, Chessed I
- Marie Jaëll – Symphonic and Piano Music
- Beethoven – Symphonies Nos 4 and 5 (Concentus Musicus Wien; Nikolaus Harnoncourt)
- David Matthews – Complete String Quartets, Vol 4
- Henryk Górecki – Symphony No 4
- Mason Bates – The B-Sides, Alternative Energy, Liquid Interface
- Johannes Matthias Sperger – Symphonies
- Jake Heggie – "The Moon's a Gong, Hung in the Wild"
- Julian Anderson – In Lieblicher Bläue
- Gaetano Donizetti – Le Duc d'Albe
- Bent Sørensen – Works for Choir
- Philippe de Monte, William Byrd, Roxanna Panufnik, Francis Pott, Alexander L'Estrange, Owain Park, Charlotte Bray, Roderick Williams – Upheld by Stillness (ORA Choir)
- Pelle Gudmundsen-Holmgreen – Incontri, Mirror II, Symphony-Antiphony
- Arthur Honegger and Jacques Ibert – L'Aiglon
- Errolyn Wallen – Photography
- James Wood – Cloud-Polyphonies / Tongues of Fire
- Wim Henderickx – At the Edge of the World, Empty Mind 1, Groove!
- Thomas Adès, Per Nørgard, Hans Abrahamsen – Works for String Quartet
- Ermanno Wolf-Ferrari – I Gioielli della Madonna
- Peter Eötvös – DoReMi, Cello Concerto Grosso
- Jürg Frey – Guitarist, Alone (Cristián Alvear, guitarist)
- George Benjamin – Dream of the Song, Magnus Lindberg – Era, Tan Dun – The Wolf
- Anthony Burgess – Orchestral Music
- Christopher Gunning – Violin Concerto, Cello Concerto
- Kenneth Hesketh – Horae (pro Clara)
- Per Nørgård – Symphonies Nos 2, 4, 5 and 6
- David Lang – the national anthems
- Colin Matthews – Violin Concerto / Cello Concerto No 2
- Beethoven – Missa Solemnis, Concentus Musicus Wien; Nikolaus Harnoncourt (his final recording)
- Beat Furrer – Enigmas, Voices – Still, Cold and Calm and Moving
- Gérard Grisey – Les Espaces Acoustiques
- Polish Violin Concertos (Andrzej Panufnik – Violin Concerto; Grażyna Bacewicz – Violin Concerto No 1; Alexandre Tansman – Cinq Pièces pour Violon et Petit Orchestre; Michał Spisak – Andante et Allegro)
- Brett Dean – Shadow Music, Short Stories
- Gabriel Jackson – Vox Clara
- Emily Howard – Magnetite, Afference
- Ernst Krenek
  - Reisebuch aus den Österreichischen Alpen
  - Orpheus und Eurydike
- Iván Fischer – Composer's Portrait 1
- John Adams – Scheherazade.2
- Mark Bowden – Lyra et al.
- Richard Causton, Kenneth Hesketh – A Land So Luminous
- Alfred Hill, George Frederick Boyle – Piano Concertos
- Charles Wuorinen – Eighth Symphony, Fourth Piano Concerto
- Harnoncourt: The Complete Sony Recordings
- Kristine Tjøgersen, Jan Martin Smørdal, Oren Ambarchi and James Rushford, Alvin Lucier, Julian Skar – Ensemble neoN
- Gavin Bryars – The Fifth Century
- Matthew Trusler (violin) and Ashley Wass (piano) – Wonderland
- Gesualdo Six – English Motets
- Mozart 225

== Deaths ==
- January 1:
  - Alan S. Gordon, American labour union leader of arts and choral performers, 70
  - Gilbert Kaplan, American businessman and philanthropist, aficionado and amateur conductor of the music of Gustav Mahler, 71
- January 5 – Pierre Boulez, French composer and conductor, 90
- January 6 – Marion Studholme, British soprano, 88
- January 13 – Bern Herbolsheimer, American composer, 67
- January 21 – Bogusław Kaczyński, Polish classical music journalist, 73
- January 23 – Robert Tuggle, American opera archivist, 83
- January 24 – Jacques Brourman, American conductor, 84
- January 25
  - Denise Duval, French soprano, 94
  - Leif Solberg, Norwegian composer and organist, 101
- January 28 – Francis Akos, Hungarian-born American orchestral violinist, 93
- January 29 – Aurèle Nicolet, Swiss flautist, 90
- February 2 – Carl David Hall, American orchestral flautist, 64
- February 3 – Saulius Sondeckis, Lithuanian violinist and conductor, 87
- February 4
  - Ulf Söderblom, Finnish conductor, 85
  - Leslie Bassett, American composer, 93
- February 14 – Steven Stucky, American composer, 66
- February 15
  - Piero Buscaroli, Italian musicologist, 85
  - Louis Lane, American conductor, 92
- February 16 – Gwyneth George, British concert cellist and academic
- February 17 – Rainer Mehne, German orchestral violinist, 68
- February 18 – Robert Baustian, American opera conductor and teacher, 94
- February 20
  - Ove Verner Hansen, Danish actor and opera singer, 83
  - Ralph Morton, Australian composer, choral conductor, and organist, 67
- February 21
  - Pascal Bentoiu, Romanian composer, 88
  - Freda, Lady Berkeley, widow of Sir Lennox Berkeley and patroness of classical music, 92
- February 23 – Peter Kamnitzer, German-born American violist of the LaSalle Quartet and conservatory professor, 93
- February 25
  - Otto-Werner Mueller, German-born American conductor and conducting instructor, 89
- February 26
  - Eri Klas, Estonian conductor, 76
  - Sherwood Mobley, American timpanist and music administrator, 59
- February 28 – Winfried Maczewski, German-born chorus master, resident in The Netherlands, 74
- March 4 – Zhou Xiaoyan, Chinese vocal pedagogue and classical soprano, 98
- March 5 – Nikolaus Harnoncourt, Austrian conductor, cellist and scholar, 86
- March 8 – Sir George Martin, British recording producer, 90
- March 14 – Sir Peter Maxwell Davies, British composer, 81
- March 17 – Charles Kaufman, American music education administrator, 87
- March 20 – Peter Williams, British musicologist, 78
- March 23 – Gegham Grigoryan, Armenian opera singer, 65
- March 24 – Sir Peter Moores, British classical music philanthropist, 83
- March 31 – Bernard Lurie, American orchestra leader (concertmaster), 82
- April 4 – Royston Nash, British conductor, 82
- April 5 – Elsie Morison, Australian soprano, 91
- April 6 – Jeremy Siepmann, American-born British pianist, teacher, writer and broadcaster, 74
- April 8 – Marcel Farago, American orchestral cellist and composer, 92
- April 12 – Alan Loveday, New Zealand-born British violinist, 88
- April 15 – Guy Woolfenden, British composer, 79
- April 16 – Theo Lap, Dutch classical record label executive, 54
- April 18 – Brian Asawa, American opera singer, 49
- April 22 – Lincoln Clark, American opera director, 90
- April 24 – George Pieterson, Dutch orchestral clarinetist, 74
- April 27 – Gabriele Sima, Austrian mezzo-soprano, 61
- April 29 – Dmytro Hnatyuk, Ukrainian operatic baritone, 91
- May 4 – Ursula Mamlok, German-born American composer, 93
- May 15
  - Bernard van Beurden, Dutch composer, 82
  - Jane Little, American orchestral double bassist, 87
- May 17 – Huguette Dreyfus, French harpsichordist, 87
- May 26
  - Gustav Meier, Swiss-born American conductor, 86
  - Robert O'Hearn, American theatre and opera production designer, 94
- June 4 – Phyllis Curtin, 94, American soprano.
- June 6 – Rolf Schweizer, German composer, 80
- June 9 – J. Reilly Lewis, American choral conductor and Baroque music specialist, 71
- June 11 – Alberto Remedios, British tenor, 81
- June 13
  - Anahid Ajemian, Armenian-American violinist and champion of new music, 92
  - Oleg Karavaychuk, Soviet and Russian composer, 88
- June 18 – Peter Feuchtwanger, German-born pianist and piano pedagogue resident in the UK, 76
- June 21 – Karen O'Connor, British orchestral oboist, 60
- June 22 – Harry Rabinowitz, South African-born British conductor and composer, 100
- June 24
  - Charles Chaynes, French composer, 90
  - Edoardo Müller, Italian conductor, 78
- June 27
  - Pelle Gudmundsen-Holmgreen, Danish composer, 83
  - Harry Halbreich, Belgian musicologist, 85
- June 29
  - Inocente Carreño, Venezuelan composer, 96.
  - Veena Sahasrabuddhe, Indian singer and composer, 67
  - Vasyl Slipak, Ukrainian opera singer, 41 (shot)
- June 30 – Franz Cibulka, Austrian composer, 69
- July 2 – David Patrick Gedge, English organist, 77
- July 5
  - Alirio Díaz, Venezuelan classical guitarist, 92
  - Gladys Nordenstrom, American composer, 92
- July 9 – Maralin Niska, American soprano, 89
- July 12 – Gregg Smith, American choral conductor and composer, 84
- July 18 – Stewart Pearce, American opera administrator and developer of Tessitura, 65
- July 20 – André Isoir, French organist, 81
- July 25 – Alasdair Graham, British pianist and academic, 82
- July 26
  - Hiroko Nakamura, Japanese classical pianist, 72
  - Paul Robertson, British violinist, leader of the Medici String Quartet, 63
- July 27
  - Einojuhani Rautavaara, Finnish composer, 87
  - Elena Doria, American opera children's chorus director, 90
- July 28 – Seth Carlin, American pianist and university professor, 71
- July 29 – Peter Sadlo, German percussionist and music teacher, 54
- August 1 – Andre Hajdu, Hungarian-born Israeli composer and ethnomusicologist, 84
- August 4 – Patrice Munsel, American soprano, 91
- August 6 – Temple Painter, American harpsichordist, 83
- August 10 – Iris Kells, English operatic soprano, 93
- August 14 – Neil Black, English oboist, 84
- August 19 – Mary Gallagher O'Rourke, Irish violinist and orchestra founder, 76
- August 20 – Daniela Dessì, Italian soprano, 59
- August 28 – John Stenhouse, British orchestral bass clarinetist, 74
- August 31 – Raymond Daveluy, Canadian composer, organist, music educator and arts administrator, 89
- September 8 – Johan Botha, South African tenor, 51
- September 24 – Emilio Gravagno, American orchestral double bassist, 82
- October 2
  - Sir Neville Marriner, British conductor and violinist, 92
  - Thomas Round, British tenor, 100
- October 5 – Pompeiu Hărășteanu, Romanian opera singer, 81
- October 7 – Anne Pashley, British opera singer and Olympic athlete, 81
- October 8 – Peter Allen, Canadian-born American radio announcer and past host of the Metropolitan Opera radio transmissions, 96
- October 28 – John Del Carlo, American bass-baritone, 61
- October 29 – Roland Dyens, Tunisian-born French guitarist, 61
- November 6 – Zoltán Kocsis, Hungarian pianist, conductor and composer, 64
- November 11 – George Reynolds, British orchestral trumpeter, 78
- November 15 – Jules Eskin, American orchestral cellist, 85
- November 24 – Pauline Oliveros, American composer, 84
- November 26 – Russell Oberlin, American countertenor, 88
- November 28 – Mark Taimanov, Russian pianist and chess grandmaster, 90
- November 30 – Donald Montanaro, American orchestral clarinetist and music institute teacher, 82
- December 3 – Gigliola Frazzoni, Italian operatic soprano, 89
- December 14 – Karel Husa, Czech-born American composer, 95
- December 23 – Heinrich Schiff, Austrian cellist, 65
- December 24 – Philip Cannon, British composer, 87
- December 28 – Bernard Zaslav, US viola player, 90

== Major awards ==
- 2016 Pulitzer Prize Winner in Music: Henry Threadgill – In for a Penny, In for a Pound
- 2016 Grawemeyer Award Winner in Music: Hans Abrahamsen – let me tell you

=== Grammy Awards ===
- Best Orchestral Performance: Dmitri Shostakovich – Under Stalin's Shadow – Symphony No. 10; Boston Symphony Orchestra; Andris Nelsons, conductor (Deutsche Grammophon)
- Best Opera Recording: Maurice Ravel: L'enfant et les sortilèges / Shéhérazade; Isabel Leonard et al.; Saito Kinen Orchestra; SKF Matsumoto Chorus & SKF Matsumoto Children's Chorus; Seiji Ozawa, conductor (Decca)
- Best Choral Performance: Sergei Rachmaninoff – All-Night Vigil; Kansas City Chorale and Phoenix Chorale; Charles Bruffy, conductor (Chandos)
- Best Chamber Music/Small Ensemble Performance: Filament – eighth blackbird (Cédille Records)
- Best Classical Instrumental Solo: Henri Dutilleux – Violin Concerto (L'Arbre Des Songes), Symphony No. 2 ('Le Double'); Augustin Hadelich, violinist; Seattle Symphony; Ludovic Morlot, conductor (Seattle Symphony Media)
- Best Classical Solo Vocal Album: Joyce & Tony – Live From Wigmore Hall; Joyce DiDonato, mezzo-soprano; Antonio Pappano, piano (Erato)
- Best Classical Compendium: Stephen Paulus – Three Places Of Enlightenment, Veil Of Tears, Grand Concerto; Nathan J. Laube, organist; Nashville Symphony; Giancarlo Guerrero, conductor (Naxos)
- Best Contemporary Classical Composition: Stephen Paulus – Prayers & Remembrances; True Concord Voices and Orchestra; Eric Holtan, conductor (Reference Recordings)

=== Juno Awards ===
Classical Albums of the Year:

- Solo or Chamber Ensemble: César Franck and Richard Strauss, Violin Sonatas; James Ehnes and Andrew Armstrong (Onyx)
- Large Ensemble or Soloist(s) with Large Ensemble Accompaniment: Camille Saint-Saëns, Samy Moussa, and Kaija Saariaho, Symphonie et créations pour orgue et orchestre; Olivier Latry, Jean-Willy Kunz, Montreal Symphony Orchestra, Kent Nagano, conductor (Analekta)
- Vocal or Choral Performance: Las Ciudades de Oro; L'Harmonie des Saisons (ATMA)

Classical Composition of the Year: Dinuk Wijeratne – Two Pop Songs on Antique Poems (Centrediscs)

=== Gramophone Classical Music Awards 2016 ===
- Baroque Instrumental: Biber – Rosary Sonatas; Rachel Podger, Jonathan Manson, David Miller, Marcin Swiatkiewicz (Channel Classics)
- Baroque Vocal: Monteverdi – Madrigali, Vol 1 – Cremona; Les Arts Florissants, Paul Agnew (Les Arts Florissants Editions)
- Chamber: Tippett – String Quartets; Heath Quartet (Wigmore Hall Live)
- Choral: Schoenberg – Gurrelieder; Barbara Haveman, Claudia Mahnke, Brandon Jovanovich, Gerhard Siegel, Thomas Bauer, Johannes Martin Kränzle; Netherlands Female Youth Choir; Cologne Cathedral Choir, Male Voices and Vocal Ensemble; Chorus of the Bach-Verein, Cologne; Kartäuserkantorei, Cologne; Cologne Gürzenich Orchestra; Markus Stenz (Hyperion)
- Concerto: Britten. Korngold – Violin Concertos; Vilde Frang, Frankfurt Radio Symphony Orchestra, James Gaffigan (Warner Classics)
- Contemporary: Hans Abrahamsen – let me tell you; Barbara Hannigan, Bavarian Radio Symphony Orchestra, Andris Nelsons (Winter & Winter)
- Early Music: Western Wind; Taverner Choir & Players / Andrew Parrott (Avie)
- Instrumental: JS Bach – Goldberg Variations / Beethoven – Diabelli Variations / Frederic Rzewski – The People United Will Never Be Defeated!; Igor Levit (Sony Classical)
- Opera: Verdi – Aida; Anja Harteros, Jonas Kaufmann, Ekaterina Semenchuk, Ludovic Tézier, Erwin Schrott, Marco Spotti, Eleonora Buratto, Paolo Fanale; Chorus and Orchestra of the Accademia Nazionale di Santa Cecilia, Sir Antonio Pappano (Warner Classics)
- Orchestral: Shostakovich – Symphony No 10 ('Under Stalin's Shadow); Boston Symphony Orchestra, Andris Nelsons (Deutsche Grammophon)
- Recital: Mozart – The Weber Sisters; Sabine Devieilhe, Arnaud de Pasqual; Ensemble Pygmalion, Raphaël Pichon (Erato)
- Solo Vocal: Néère; Véronique Gens, Susan Manoff (Alpha)
- Recording of the Year: Bruckner – JS Bach – Goldberg Variations / Beethoven – Diabelli Variations / Frederic Rzewski – The People United Will Never Be Defeated!; Igor Levit (Sony Classical)
- Young Artist of the Year: Benjamin Appl
- Label of the Year: Warner Classics
- Artist of the Year: Daniil Trifonov
- Lifetime Achievement Award: Christa Ludwig
- Special Achievement Award: BBC Radio 3

=== British Composer Awards ===
- Amateur or Young Performers: Jonathan Dove – The Monster in the Maze
- Chamber Ensemble: Leo Chadburn – Freezywater
- Choral: Roderick Williams – Ave verum corpus re-imagined
- Community or Educational Project: John Webb – Into the Light
- Contemporary Jazz Composition: Joe Cutler – Karembeu's Guide to the Complete Defensive Midfielder
- Orchestral: Rebecca Saunders – Alba
- Small Chamber: Oliver Leith – A Day at the Spa
- Solo or Duo: Mark Bowden – Five Memos
- Sonic Art: Claudia Molitor – Sonorama
- Stage Works: Tansy Davies – Between Worlds
- Wind Band or Brass Band: Shri Sriram – Just a Vibration
