= Rapture (poetry collection) =

Poetry collection by Carol Ann Duffy

- Front Cover of Rapture by Carol Ann Duffy
- Author: Carol Ann Duffy
- Language: English
- Genre: Poetry
- Publisher: Picador
- Publication date: 2005
- Publication place: United Kingdom
- Media type: Print
- Pages: 85 pp.
- ISBN: 9781466895867

Rapture is a collection of poetry written by Scottish poet Carol Ann Duffy, the Poet Laureate of the United Kingdom. It marks her 37th work of poetry and has been described as "intensely personal, emotional and elegiac, and markedly different from Duffy’s other works" by the British Council. Rapture was first published in 2005 in the UK by Picador, and in 2013 in the US by Farrar, Straus, and Giroux.

Rapture received the 2005 T. S. Eliot Prize.

== Synopsis ==
Rapture follows the narrator through a love story. It begins with falling in love. “Uninvited, the thought of you stayed too late in my head, so I went to bed, dreaming you hard, hard, woke with your name, like tears, soft, salt, on my lips, the sound of its bright syllables, like a charm, like a spell.” Later on, the tone of the book shifts from head over heels in love to brokenhearted. “The garden tenses, lies face down, bereaved, has wept its leaves.The Latin names of plants blur like belief. I walk on ice, it grimaces, then breaks. All my mistakes are frozen in the tight lock of my face. Bare trees hold out their arms, beseech, entreat, cannot forget. The clouds sag with the burden of their weight. The wind screams at the house, bitter, betrayed. The sky is flayed, the moon a fingernail, bitten and frayed.” Rapture is also symbolic of the end of time when interlinking her catholic upbringing with her poetry collection.

== Reception ==
Critical reception for Rapture has been positive. In a review for The Guardian Margaret Reynolds praised Duffy's lyrical voice and her attention to repetition and wordplay, stating "Reading about an affair is not supposed to have the same effect. But it does in the case of Carol Ann Duffy's Rapture." In his review for The New York Times William Logan focused on Duffy's language, comparing her work to Auden and Elizabeth Barrett Browning. The Rumpus also praised Duffy's writing and wrote that "In Rapture, surprises land like a lover’s touch and scribble on your skin, right off the page".

Rapture is studied as part of the OCR (EMC) A-Level qualification in English Language and Literature, across schools and colleges in England.

=== Awards ===
- T. S. Eliot Prize for poetry (2005, won)
