= Saint Louis Chamber Chorus =

American 40 voice a cappella chorus

The Saint Louis Chamber Chorus is a large chamber choir, numbering 45 – 50 mixed voices, that presents seasons of six programs performed in St. Louis, Missouri, in venues of historic and/or architectural note. It generally performs without instrumental accompaniment and is well suited to repertoire for double choir and more. Each season includes 50 complete works or more, and generally in the original language. Since pieces are rarely repeated from season to season, the choir enjoys one of the largest repertoires for a choir of its type and size. A complete listing of works sung throughout its history is found on the Chorus website. The choir has long been identified as an advocate for contemporary music, and has championed several women composers, particularly through its Composer-in-Residence program.

== History ==
Founded in 1956 by British organist, Ronald Arnatt, as the Saint Louis Chamber Orchestra & Chorus, the ensemble was soon recognized for its pioneering significant works by Delius, Stravinsky and Vaughan Williams, some of whose pieces received their North American premieres thanks to Arnatt & his musicians. The choir received various invitations outside St. Louis, including visits to the White House and the Washington National Cathedral. Soon after Arnatt relocated to Boston in the late 1970s, the ensemble represented St. Louis at the Sister City Twinning Ceremony in Stuttgart, Germany. Shortly after their return the Orchestra was discontinued, but the choir remained known as ‘The Chorus’ and was directed by a Webster University academic, Allen Carl Larson. After four years at the helm, Larson resigned and was succeeded by another college professor (from Forest Park Community College), Stephen Curtis.

Curtis maintained the group’s reputation for imaginative programming performed competently around the city until he too resigned to take up an appointment in Philadelphia. Following a year-long search for his replacement, Philip Barnes – a native of Great Britain like Ronald Arnatt – was appointed Artistic Director in 1989. Under his direction the Chorus has grown in quality and thus stature and is now regarded as one of the Midwest’s finest chamber choirs. The group’s reputation has been enhanced through a series of recordings and YouTube video presentations.

== Governance & Compensation ==
A board of elected volunteers oversees the running of the Chamber Chorus through regular monthly meetings. The organization is entirely independent of any institutional or religious affiliation. The administration of the Chamber Chorus is led by an Executive Director, with fundraising specifically assigned to a Advancement Director. Each concert is facilitated by a Concert Coordinator. Artistic leadership is the responsibility of the Artistic Director, who is aided by two Assistant Conductors. Choir practices are assisted by a rehearsal accompanist. Maintaining the choir’s considerable collection of scores is the responsibility of two librarians. The importance of all these positions is recognized through modest salaries or honoraria. In addition, each singer receives an honorarium for performing a concert program. There are no section leaders, and all solos are assigned from within the group.

== Membership ==
Some of St. Louis’s finest choral musicians are, or have been, associated with the choir, and membership is highly sought after. The Chorus holds annual auditions each summer, with occasional make-up sessions throughout the year. These auditions are thorough and include two chosen pieces, sight singing exercises and ear tests. There is no charge for an applicant’s first audition. Members of the Chorus have generally gained choral experience through strong high school and/or college programs, and it is the organization’s policy not to admit undergraduates, who concentrate their energies on making the most of their college opportunities.

== Repertoire ==
The Chorus performs music from many different periods and traditions, starting with an early 13th century round and culminating with world premieres of pieces specifically written for the group. While mainstays of the Renaissance are frequently sung, particular attention is paid to the German Romantic School (Mendelssohn, Schumann and Brahms) because the choir’s distinctive blend is so appropriate for this repertoire. That the choir’s founder and current Artistic Director are both English explains the preponderance of British composers, but American musicians and others from around the globe are not neglected. Particular attention is paid to women composers, and new music is always a feature of every season, in part due to the Composer-in-Residence program.

== Significant Performances ==
Under Ronald Arnatt the ensemble was invited to sing at The White House and the Washington National Cathedral, performing Vaughan Williams’s “Mass in G Minor” in the presence of the composer’s widow. Under Allen Carl Larson’s direction, the ensemble traveled to Stuttgart, Germany, to perform at the official ceremony where the city was twinned with St. Louis.

During Philip Barnes’s tenure the Chorus has sung on two soundtracks, the TV mini-series “Labyrinth” (producer Ridley Scott), and the independent feature film, “To Tokyo” (director Caspar Seale-Jones), singing the music of Oscar-winning composer, Trevor Jones. Members of the Chorus have performed at the regional or national conference of various professional organizations, and even served as back-up singers for Barry Manilow during a performance in St. Louis.

Performances have ranged from buildings of outstanding significance and beauty to unusual settings like the Schlafly Brewery Tap Room and an outdoor program at the New Mount Sinai Cemetery.

== Artistic Directors ==
- 1956 – 1978 Ronald Arnatt
- 1978 – 1982 Allen Carl Larson
- 1982 – 1987 Stephen Curtis
- 1989 – present Philip Barnes

== Composers-in-Residence ==
- 1998 – 2006 Sasha Johnson Manning (UK)
- 2006 – 2011 Clare Maclean (New Zealand/Australia)
- 2011 – 2014 Yakov Gubanov (Ukraine/Russia)
- 2014 – 2018 Melissa Dunphy (Australia/USA)
- 2019 – 2022 Mårten Jansson (Sweden)
- 2022 – 2025 Kerensa Briggs (UK)

== Discography ==
- Choral Masterpieces (SLCC)
- Vox Pop (SLCC)
- A Chamber Christmas (SLCC)
- A Spanish Christmas (SLCC)
- Rejoicing In His Birth (SLCC)
- Rome’s Golden Poets (Bolchazy-Carducci, 1999)
- Singing St. Louis (SLCC)
- Songs of the Soul (Guild, 2005)
- Saint Louis Commissions (Regent, 2007)
- A Pageant of Human Life: Choral Music of Granville Bantock (Regent, 2009)
- Christmas from St. Louis (Regent, 2012)
- American Declarations (Regent, 2014)
- Saint Louis Firsts (Regent, 2016)
- Saint Louis Classics (Regent, 2018)
- Saint Louis Premieres (Regent, 2020)
