= Anthologise Poetry Competition =

Anthologise is a national poetry competition for British secondary schools. It was established in 2011, and is spearheaded by Carol-Ann Duffy, the Poet Laureate. The competition is administered by the publishing house Picador. The competition was launched by the Duchess of Cambridge in September 2011.

Schoolchildren aged 11 to 18 are invited to create and submit their own anthologies of published poetry to an expert judging panel of poets, academics and critics. In 2011 the Anthologise judges were Carol-Ann Duffy; Gillian Clarke (National Poet for Wales); John Agard; Grace Nichols; and Cambridge Professor of Children's Poetry, Morag Styles.

The first ever winners of Anthologise were Monkton Combe School, Bath, with their anthology called The Poetry of Earth is Never Dead.
