= Melissa Dunphy =

Australian-American composer

- Born: April 11, 1980 (age 46); Brisbane, Australia, U.S.
- Education: West Chester University, University of Pennsylvania
- Occupation: Composer
- Website: melissadunphy.com

Melissa Dunphy (born 1980) is an Australian-American composer best known for her vocal, political, and theatrical music. Born in Australia and raised in an immigrant family, Dunphy herself immigrated to the United States in 2003 and has since become an award‐winning and acclaimed composer.

She first came to national attention when her large‐scale work the Gonzales Cantata, a 40-minute choral piece in Baroque style that sets the text of the parts of the dismissal of U.S. attorneys controversy hearings in which former Attorney General Alberto Gonzales testified. It was featured in The Wall Street Journal, The Atlantic, National Review, Fox News, and on the Rachel Maddow Show in 2009; Maddow described it as "probably the coolest thing you've ever seen on this show." Dunphy completed her doctoral degree at the University of Pennsylvania in 2014 and is currently on the composition faculty at Rutgers University.

== Early life ==
Born in Brisbane, Australia, Dunphy was raised in an immigrant household. Dunphy's father was a Greek immigrant, and her mother was a refugee who fled from China to evade the Cultural Revolution. Dunphy first began piano lessons at age 3. Her mother introduced her to music after reading that "kids who studied classical music are better at math." Dunphy grew up playing violin and viola in addition to singing in choirs.

After graduating high school, Dunphy moved to Sydney to attend medical school, which she left after 9 months, and explored careers in corporate law, television production, and live theater. After immigrating to the United States in 2003, Dunphy was asked to write music at the last minute for a production of A Midsummer Night's Dream that she was acting in, which helped her discover her love of composing and choose to pursue it professionally.

== Career ==
Dunphy has served as the composer-in-residence for multiple institutions, namely the Immaculata Symphony Orchestra (2010), the Volti Choral Arts Lab (2013–2014, 2016), and the St. Louis Chamber Chorus (2015–2018). She has been the Director of Music Composition for the National Puppetry Conference at the Eugene O'Neill Theater Center since 2014. Dunphy has been a Part-Time Lecturer and Composition Instructor at Rutgers University Mason Gross School of the Arts since 2018, and was a University of Pennsylvania Music Department Lecturer (Graduate Composition Seminar) in 2020. She is currently the President of the Board of Wildflower Composers (formerly known as Young Women Composers Camp) since 2021, and has been a member of the board since 2020.

- Rutgers University Mason Gross School of the Arts Part-Time Lecturer, Composition Instructor – since 2018
- National Puppetry Conference at the Eugene O'Neill Theater Center, Director of Music Composition – since 2014
- President of Wildflower Composers (formerly known as Young Women Composers Camp), board member since 2020 and Composition Teacher in 2020
- 2020: University of Pennsylvania Music Department Lecturer (Graduate Composition Seminar)
- 2010: Composer-in-residence, Immaculata Symphony Orchestra
- 2013–2014: Composer-in-residence, Volti Choral Arts Lab
- 2016: Composer-in-residence, Volti Choral Institute
- 2015–2018: Composer-in-residence, St. Louis Chamber Chorus

== The Boghouse ==
In 2016, Melissa Dunphy and her husband, Matthew Dunphy, discovered revolutionary war-era privies while renovating a former magic theater that they had just purchased in Old City, Philadelphia. After excavating the first privy (which extended 19 feet below the property), they found hundreds of ceramic artifacts, glass bottles, oyster shells, and animal bones dating back to the early 1700s. Refusing to sell the items, the Dunphys kept the artifacts and are still in the process of cleaning centuries worth of composted human feces and mud from the various broken sherds and artifacts, and slowly piecing them back together.

Melissa and Matthew have a podcast named The Boghouse where they talk about their adventures buying the magic theater, and the chaos that followed their discovery of thousands of pre-revolutionary artifacts. They tell stories about the people behind the artifacts and their changing neighborhood over the decades that the privies were active. The podcast has been described as "richly informative" and "highly amusing" and the Dunphys have been called "exactly the advocates archaeology needs".

== Choral works ==
A Gritty Resolution In 2024, Melissa Dunphy was commissioned by the local a cappella group PhilHarmonia to write a composition for its 10th anniversary show. The only stipulation was that it had to be about Philadelphia.Although Dunphy, a Philadelphia enthusiast, was nearing her deadline with no ideas, inspiration struck as she glanced at her 2020 protest sign featuring Gritty, one of the city's sports mascots. The sign, which read "F--- around and find out", sparked the idea to write a song about Gritty.

Dunphy chose to set the 2018 City Council resolution welcoming Gritty as the mascot for the Philadelphia Flyers. The result was "A Gritty Resolution", likely the first choral work based on a city's resolution honoring a sports mascot, generating significant interest from choirs nationwide.

PhilHarmonia premiered "A Gritty Resolution" along with two other commissioned pieces at its free 10th anniversary concert, in the summer of 2024. The event, held at the Settlement Music School's Germantown branch, featured various works celebrating Philadelphia, including an a cappella rendition of the 6ABC Action News theme song.

"We really don't have hockey in Australia, where I'm originally from. Ice skating isn't a 'thing' there. But Gritty is the best thing ever. I would die for Gritty."

N-400 Erasure Songs

Dunphy was commissioned by Cantus, an eight-member male vocal ensemble, in 2021 to write a piece on the subject of immigration. She asked two poets, Nina Pollari and Laurel Chen, to black out text on the Form N-400 to create Erasure poetry which she then set to music.

The work consists of three movements and has been described as "powerful", and "haunting and mournful". An SATB arrangement was subsequently commissioned by the South Bend Chamber Singers, and the work has notably been performed by Boston Choral Ensemble, Seattle Pro Musica, Quincy Civic Music Association, and numerous times by Cantus.

== Operatic works ==
=== Alice Tierney ===
In 2020, Dunphy was commissioned by the Oberlin Opera Commissioning Program to develop her opera Alice Tierney with librettist Jacqueline Goldfinger. She was the recipient of a 2020 Discovery Grant from Opera America, funding three workshops with Oberlin Conservatory students that took place while the work was created. The opera tells the story of 19th century sex worker Alice Tierney, who was found strangled on a fence at the back of Dunphy's property in Center City Philadelphia in 1880. Her death was ruled as an accident and never investigated, though a murder is a far more likely explanation. The story of Alice Tierney is told through the perspective of four modern-day graduate archaeology students who are excavating the property and trying to piece together the details of Tierney's life and death. The archaeologists share their own backstories, which influence how they interpret the various clues they find about Alice's life. Ultimately, the opera explores questions of how stories change depending on who is telling the story – how our own assumptions, motivations, and bias influence the way we understand a narrative.

Alice Tierney is influenced by a variety of musical styles: Dunphy describes her music as a mix of "pop music from the two eras, the 1880s and 2023". The opera was premiered at Oberlin Conservatory and Opera Columbus in the spring of 2023, and was mounted again at Boston University in October 2023.

Since the premier, the Dunphy's have continued to dig in and around their property, finding large amounts of historic artifacts, piecing together broken pieces into nearly intact bowls.

=== Gonzales Cantata ===
Conceived while Dunphy was at West Chester University, the cantata has a libretto taken entirely from the transcript of the Gonzales hearings, which Dunphy found dramatic. Because Dunphy wished to highlight the fact that the Senate Judiciary Committee was made up entirely of men, with the exception of Dianne Feinstein – and also because there are more female opera singers than male – she reversed the genders and cast sopranos as Gonzales and as the male senators. Orrin Hatch is an alto, because he was more sympathetic to Gonzales and it needed "a different vibe"; Feinstein is a male tenor. The cantata includes an aria for Gonzales called "I Don't Recall", in which the soprano sings the title phrase 72 times, the same number of times that Gonzales said it in the hearings. Dunphy reports that she asked John Ashcroft for permission to arrange his song "Let the Eagle Soar" as a "companion piece", but he turned her down on grounds of "artistic differences".

The piece is generally Baroque in style, with some use of more modernist dissonance in the orchestration. Julian Sanchez described the cantata as "sort of like Henry Purcell filtered through late John Adams"; other reviewers mentioned its similarity to Handelian opera or to P.D.Q. Bach, or pointed out the use of "Coplandesque harmonies when characters were being folksy".

The work premiered at the Philadelphia Fringe Festival in September 2009. It was staged as a cantata or oratorio; characters wore red or blue dresses depending on party affiliation, with tiaras as well as sashes bearing their names. American Opera Theater staged the work as an opera in February 2011; reviews were less positive, with critics saying that Dunphy's parody of Baroque music compared unfavorably to P.D.Q. Bach and criticizing her out-of-period use of dissonance. Anne Midgette, criticizing the piece's lack of a coherent message, wrote, "Performed as a cantata, this piece may be an amusing diversion; staged as an opera, it reveals its dramatic deficiencies and loses some of its zany humor."

=== Everything for Dawn ===
Dunphy was one of 10 commissioned composers for the video opera series Everything for Dawn, commissioned by Experiments in Opera and presented by All Arts. The series takes place in suburban Detroit and tells the story of college-aged Dawn and her father, Mac, who has recently taken his own life. Dawn and her mother discover a box of Mac's paintings, which attract national attention after being presented in a local gallery, and Dawn grapples with the fact that her personal tragedy is being seen by the public. The video opera shows Mac discovering art therapy during his time at a mental health facility and explores how Mac's mental illness and eventual suicide have affected young Dawn.

Each 15-minute episode was written by a different librettist and composer pairing; Dunphy teamed up with librettist Krista Knight to create episode 6: "At the Crack of Dawn", which depicts Dawn's first visit to see her mentally ill father at a mental hospital. Dunphy drew upon her own experiences with a mentally ill parent to create the episode, mentioning specific details like the smell of mashed potatoes, and capturing the anticipation, fear, and awkwardness that one experiences as they visit a hospitalized family member for the first time. The music is influenced by a wide range of genres, blending musical theater with opera and incorporating elements of mid-90's alt-rock.

== Selected other works ==
- Black Thunder (2008) – work for baritone, violin, cello, and piano which received an honorable mention in the ASCAP/Lotte Lehmann Foundation 2009 Art Song Competition.
- What do you think I fought for at Omaha Beach? (2010) – choral work to the text of public testimony by WWII veteran Philip Spooner in support of Maine's No on 1 campaign, which aimed to preserve same-sex marriage in the state. It won the 2010 Simon Carrington Chamber Singers Composition Competition.
- American Dreamers (2022) - choral work set to a collection of 5 texts from American writers reflecting on their experiences immigrating to the U.S. when they were children. The piece was commissioned by PhilHarmonia, a Philadelphia-based community choir led by Mitos Andaya Hart.
- Alice Tierney (2023) - an "archeology opera" based on Dunphy's experiences excavating privy sites near her Philadelphia home. The piece was commissioned and premiered the Oberlin Opera Theater.

== Awards and honors ==
Dunphy has received awards from NATS Art Song Composition which won first place for her song cycle Tesla's Pigeon, and choral work What do you think I fought for at Omaha Beach? which won the Simon Carrington Chamber Singers Competition and has been performed nationally by ensembles including Chanticleer and Cantus. In 2024, Dunphy was awarded and Independence Foundation Fellowship in the Arts. She was the recipient of a 2020 Opera America Discovery Grant for Alice Tierney, an opera commissioned by Oberlin Conservatory which premiered in 2023 at Oberlin and Opera Columbus.

Dunphy has been a composer in residence with the Immaculata Symphony Orchestra since 2010. She also previously worked with Volti Choral Arts Lab from 2013 to 2014, Volti Choral Institute in 2016, and the Saint Louis Chamber Chorus from 2015 to 2018.

- 2020: Opera America Discovery Grant, Alice Tierney, Oberlin Conservatory Opera
- 2019: West Chester University Foundation, Distinguished Alumna Award
- 2019: Barrymore Award nomination: Outstanding Sound Design, Hype Man: A Break Beat Play, InterAct Theatre Company
- 2019: Barrymore Award nomination: Outstanding Original Music, Among the Dead, Theatre Exile
- 2019: Winner – Calliope's Call Art Song and Vocal Chamber Music Call for Scores, Come, My Tan-Faced Children
- 2017: Honorable Mention – RED NOTE New Music Festival Composition Competition, O Oriens
- 2015: Honorable Mention – Boston Choral Ensemble Commission Competition, Together
- 2014: Winner – Chicago Ensemble Discover America VIII, Tesla's Pigeon
- 2014: Semi-finalist – Apollo Chamber Players 2014 International Commissioning Contest, Captain Samuels Speaks to the Sea!
- 2013: Boston Metro Opera Merit Award, Tesla's Pigeon
- 2013: Winner – The American Prize in Composition: Chamber Music Student category, Tesla's Pigeon
- 2012: Winner – National Association of Teachers of Singing Art Song Composition Award, Tesla's Pigeon
- 2012: Tesla Science Foundation "Spirit of Tesla" Award, Tesla's Pigeon
- 2011: University of Pennsylvania Helen L. Weiss Music Prize, Tesla's Pigeon
- 2010: Finalist – National Opera Association Chamber Opera Competition, The Gonzales Cantata
- 2010: Winner – Simon Carrington Chamber Singers Composition Competition, What do you think I fought for at Omaha Beach?
- 2009: Highly Commended – ASCAP/Lotte Lehmann Foundation Art Song Competition, Black Thunder

== Sound Design ==
Dunphy was nominated for two 2018–2019 Barrymore Awards for Excellence in Theatre: one for Hype Man: A Break Beat Play at Interact Theater Company (Award for Outstanding Sound Design), and the second for Among the Dead at Theatre Exile (Outstanding Original Music).

== Acting ==
Dunphy is also a stage actress. She has played a number of Shakespearean roles for theatre festivals and companies in Pennsylvania, where she has resided since 2003. The Philadelphia Inquirer called her "unquestionably the city's leading Shakespeare ingenue" for her performance as Ophelia in the Lantern Theater Company's Hamlet.
