= Franz Cibulka =

Austrian composer

- Born: December 23, 1946
- Died: June 27, 2016 (aged 69)
- Era: Contemporary

Franz Peter Cibulka (23 December 1946 – 27 June 2016) was an Austrian composer.

== Career ==
Cibulka was born in Fohnsdorf, Austria. Having completed his musical studies in Clarinet, composition and orchestral conducting at the Academy for Music and Performing Arts in Graz, he served as Professor of Clarinet, Chamber Music and Music Theory at the Johann Joseph Fux Conservatory in Graz until July 2002.

Cibulka achieved an international reputation following the performance in 1997 of several of his works at the World Association for Symphonic Bands and Ensembles (WASBE) held in Schladming, Austria. He was later invited to Australia, America, Russia, and many European countries as a composer, conductor, performer, juror, and lecturer.

He died on 27 June 2016.

== Work ==
His list of works includes more than 300 compositions of the most diverse instrumentation and styles resulting from his artistic collaboration with various performers. Cibulka mainly arranged compositions on demand, respecting the artists' wishes and ideas. However, he also wrote music that reflected his own creativity and visions. This can be thoroughly felt in pieces such as Aquarius, in which he transformed his despair about humans' misuse of nature into an exceptional musical work.

Cibulka's compositions were championed in Australia and were performed by the Heidelberg Wind Ensemble of Melbourne. His name has been given to the International Franz Cibulka Music Competition, held in Graz.
