= Carol Ann Duffy =

Scottish poet and playwright (born 1955)

Dame Carol Ann Duffy DBE FRSL HonFBA HonFRSE
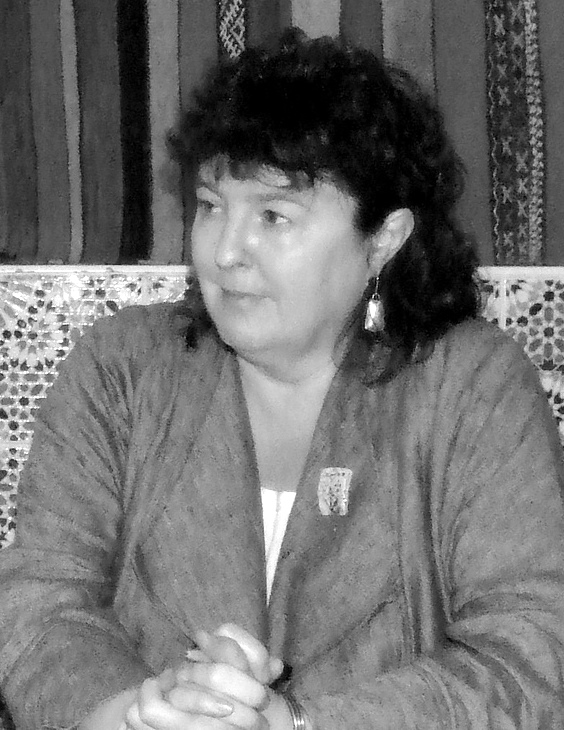
- Duffy in 2009

Poet Laureate of the United Kingdom
- In office 1 May 2009 – 10 May 2019
- Monarch: Elizabeth II
- Preceded by: Andrew Motion
- Succeeded by: Simon Armitage

Personal details
- Born: 23 December 1955 (age 70) Glasgow, Scotland
- Children: 1
- Education: University of Liverpool (B.A. Hons, Philosophy)
- Occupation: Poet, playwright

Dame Carol Ann Duffy (born 23 December 1955) is a Scottish poet and playwright. She is a professor of contemporary poetry at Manchester Metropolitan University, and was appointed Poet Laureate in May 2009, serving in this position until her term ended in 2019. She was the first female, the first Scottish-born and the first openly lesbian poet to hold the Poet Laureate position.

Her collections include Standing Female Nude (1985), winner of a Scottish Arts Council Book Award; Selling Manhattan (1987), which won a Somerset Maugham Award; Mean Time (1993), which won the Whitbread Poetry Award; and Rapture (2005), which won the T. S. Eliot Prize. Her poems address issues such as oppression, gender, and violence, in accessible language.

== Early life ==
Carol Ann Duffy was born into a Roman Catholic family in the Gorbals area of Glasgow. She was the daughter of Mary (née Black) and Frank Duffy, an electrical fitter. Her mother's parents were Irish, and her father had Irish grandparents. The eldest of five siblings, she has four brothers: Frank, Adrian, Eugene and Tim. The family moved to Stafford, England, when Duffy was six years old. Her father worked for English Electric. A trade unionist, he stood unsuccessfully as a parliamentary candidate for the Labour Party in 1983 in addition to managing Stafford Football Club.

Duffy was educated in Stafford at Saint Austin's RC Primary School (1962–1967), St. Joseph's Convent School (1967–1970), and Stafford Girls' High School (1970–1974), her literary talent encouraged by two English teachers, June Scriven at St Joseph's, and Jim Walker at Stafford Girls' High. She was a passionate reader from an early age, and always wanted to be a writer, producing poems from the age of 11. When one of her English teachers died, she wrote:

You sat on your desk,
swinging your legs,
reading a poem by Yeats
to the bored girls,
except my heart stumbled and blushed
as it fell in love with the words and I saw the tree
in the scratched old desk under my hands,
heard the bird in the oak outside scribble itself on the air.

== Career ==
Some days, although we cannot pray, a prayer
utters itself. So, a woman will lift
her head from the sieve of her hands and stare
at the minims sung by a tree, a sudden gift.

Some nights, although we are faithless, the truth
enters our hearts, that small familiar pain;
then a man will stand stock-still, hearing his youth
in the distant Latin chanting of a train.

— From "Prayer",
Mean Time, Anvil, 1994

When Duffy was 15, June Scriven sent her poems to Outposts, a publisher of pamphlets, where it was read by the bookseller Bernard Stone, who published some of them. When she was 16, she met Adrian Henri, 39 at the time, one of the Liverpool poets, and decided she wanted to be with him; she then lived with him for 10 years until they split in 1982. "He gave me confidence," she said, "he was great. It was all poetry, very heady, and he was never faithful. He thought poets had a duty to be unfaithful."

She applied to the University of Liverpool to be near him, and began a philosophy degree there in 1974. She had two plays performed at the Liverpool Playhouse, wrote a pamphlet, Fifth Last Song, and received an honours degree in philosophy in 1977. She won the National Poetry Competition in 1983. She worked as poetry critic for The Guardian from 1988 to 1989, and was editor of the poetry magazine, Ambit. In 1996, she was appointed as a lecturer in poetry at Manchester Metropolitan University, and later became creative director of its Writing School.

Duffy was a contender for the post of Poet Laureate of the United Kingdom in 1999 after the death of Ted Hughes, but lost out to Andrew Motion. Prime Minister Tony Blair had raised concerns about how "middle England" would react to a lesbian poet laureate. Duffy said she would not have accepted the position at that time anyway, because she was in a relationship with Scottish poet Jackie Kay, had a young daughter, and would not have welcomed the public attention. In the same year, she was elected as a Fellow of the Royal Society of Literature.

She was appointed as Poet Laureate on 1 May 2009, when Motion's 10-year term was over. Duffy was featured on The South Bank Show with Melvyn Bragg in December 2009 and on 7 December she presented the Turner Prize to artist Richard Wright.

Duffy received an Honorary Doctorate from Heriot-Watt University in 2009.

In 2015, Duffy was elected as an Honorary Fellow of the British Academy.

=== Poet laureate ===
In her first poem as poet laureate, Duffy tackled the scandal over British MPs' expenses in the format of a sonnet. Her second, "Last Post", was commissioned by the BBC to mark the deaths of Henry Allingham and Harry Patch, the last remaining British soldiers to fight in World War I. Her third, "The Twelve Days of Christmas 2009", addresses current events such as species extinction, the climate change conference in Copenhagen, the banking crisis, and the war in Afghanistan. In March 2010, she wrote "Achilles (for David Beckham)" about the Achilles tendon injury that left David Beckham out of the English football team at the 2010 FIFA World Cup; the poem was published in The Daily Mirror and treats modern celebrity culture as a kind of mythicisation. "Silver Lining," written in April 2010, acknowledges the grounding of flights caused by the ash of the Icelandic volcano Eyjafjallajökull. On 30 August 2010 she premièred her poem "Vigil" for the Manchester Pride Candlelight Vigil in memory of LGBTQ people who have lost their lives to HIV/AIDS.

Duffy wrote a 46-line poem, "Rings," for the 2011 wedding of Prince William and Catherine Middleton. The poem celebrates the rings found in nature and does not specifically mention the couple's names. It begins for both to say and continues: "I might have raised your hand to the sky / to give you the ring surrounding the moon / or looked to twin the rings of your eyes / with mine / or added a ring to the rings of a tree / by forming a handheld circle with you, thee, / ...". She wrote the verse with Stephen Raw, a textual artist, and a signed print of the work was sent to the couple as a wedding gift. Duffy also wrote the poem "The Throne," which she composed for the 60th anniversary of Queen Elizabeth II's coronation.

In Stylist magazine, Duffy said of becoming poet laureate: "There's no requirement. I do get asked to do things and so far I've been happy to do them." She also spoke about being appointed to the role by Queen Elizabeth II, saying: "She's lovely! I met her before I became poet laureate but when I was appointed I had an 'audience' with her which meant we were alone, at the palace, for the first time. We chatted about poetry. Her mother was friends with Ted Hughes whose poetry I admire a lot. We spoke about his influence on me."

In her appointment, the Prime Minister of the United Kingdom at the time, Gordon Brown, congratulated her as the first woman to hold the title. Calling her a "truly brilliant modern poet". Brown also referred to Duffy as "one of the most distinguished writers in the English language".

Duffy stood down as laureate in May 2019.

== Poetry ==
=== Style ===
Duffy's work explores both everyday experience and the rich fantasy life of herself and others. In dramatizing scenes from childhood, adolescence, and adult life, she discovers moments of consolation through love, memory, and language. Charlotte Mendelson writes in The Observer:

Part of Duffy's talent – besides her ear for ordinary eloquence, her gorgeous, powerful, throwaway lines, her subtlety – is her ventriloquism. Like the best of her novelist peers ... she slides in and out of her characters' lives on a stream of possessions, aspirations, idioms and turns of phrase. However, she is also a time-traveller and a shape-shifter, gliding from Troy to Hollywood, galaxies to intestines, sloughed-off skin to department stores while other poets make heavy weather of one kiss, one kick, one letter ... from verbal nuances to mind-expanding imaginative leaps, her words seem freshly plucked from the minds of non-poets – that is, she makes it look easy.

Of her own writing, Duffy has said: "I'm not interested, as a poet, in words like 'plash'—Seamus Heaney words, interesting words. I like to use simple words, but in a complicated way." She told The Observer: "Like the sand and the oyster, it's a creative irritant. In each poem, I'm trying to reveal a truth, so it can't have a fictional beginning."

Duffy rose to greater prominence in UK poetry circles after her poem "Whoever She Was" won the Poetry Society National Poetry Competition in 1983. In her first collection, Standing Female Nude (1985), she uses the voices of outsiders, for example in the poems "Education for Leisure" and "Dear Norman." Her next collection, Feminine Gospels (2002), continues this vein, showing an increased interest in long narrative poems, accessible in style and often surreal in their imagery. Her 2005 publication, Rapture (2005), is a series of intimate poems charting the course of a love affair, for which she won the £10,000 T. S. Eliot Prize. In 2007, she published The Hat, a collection of poems for children. Online copies of her poems are rare, but her poem dedicated to U A Fanthorpe, "Premonitions," is available through The Guardian, and several others via The Daily Mirror.

=== In schools ===
Duffy's poems are studied in British schools at ISC, GCSE, National 5, A-level, and higher levels. In August 2008, her "Education for Leisure," a poem about violence, was removed from the GCSE AQA Anthology, following a complaint about its references to knife crime and a goldfish being flushed down a toilet. The poem begins: "Today I am going to kill something. Anything./I have had enough of being ignored and today/I am going to play God." The protagonist kills a fly, then a goldfish. The budgie panics and the cat hides. It ends with him, or her, or them, leaving the house with a knife. "The pavements glitter suddenly. I touch your arm."

According to The Guardian, schools were urged to destroy copies of the unedited anthology, though this was later denied by AQA. Duffy called the decision ridiculous. "It's an anti-violence poem," she said. "It is a plea for education rather than violence." She responded with "Mrs Schofield's GCSE", a poem about violence in other fiction, and the point of it. "Explain how poetry/pursues the human like the smitten moon/above the weeping, laughing earth ..." The Mrs. Schofield of the title refers to Pat Schofield, an external examiner at Lutterworth College, Leicestershire, who complained about "Education for Leisure," calling it "absolutely horrendous."

For the new National Qualifications Higher English Course in Scotland, Duffy's agents, RCW Literacy Agency, refused permission for her poem, "Originally," to be reproduced in the publicly accessible version of the paper.

=== Anthologise annual competition for schools ===
In 2011, Duffy spearheaded a new poetry competition for schools, named Anthologise. The competition is administered by the Poetry Book Society and was launched by the Duchess of Cornwall in September 2011. School students aged 11–18 from around the UK were invited to create and submit their own anthologies of published poetry. The 2011 Anthologise judges were Duffy; Gillian Clarke (National Poet for Wales); John Agard; Grace Nichols and Cambridge Professor of Children's Poetry, Morag Styles. The first ever winners of Anthologise were the sixth form pupils of Monkton Combe School, Bath, with their anthology titled The Poetry of Earth is Never Dead, which was described by Duffy as "assured and accomplished as any anthology currently on the bookshelves."

=== Plays and songs ===
Duffy is also a playwright, and has had plays performed at the Liverpool Playhouse and the Almeida Theatre in London. Her plays include Take My Husband (1982), Cavern of Dreams (1984), Little Women, Big Boys (1986) Loss (1986), Casanova (2007). Her radio credits include an adaptation of Rapture. Her children's collections include Meeting Midnight (1999) and The Oldest Girl in the World (2000). She also collaborated with the Manchester composer, Sasha Johnson Manning, on The Manchester Carols, a series of Christmas songs that premiered in Manchester Cathedral in 2007.

She also participated in the Bush Theatre's 2011 project Sixty-Six Books, for which she wrote a piece based on a book of the King James Bible.

A modernised adaptation of Everyman by Duffy, with Chiwetel Ejiofor in the title role, was performed at the Royal National Theatre from April to July 2015.

== Personal life ==
At the age of 16, Duffy began a relationship with poet Adrian Henri, living with him until 1982. Duffy later met poet Jackie Kay, with whom she had a 15-year relationship. During her relationship with Kay, Duffy gave birth to a daughter, Ella (born 1995), whose biological father is fellow poet Peter Benson.

Raised in her parents' Roman Catholic faith, Duffy dispensed from religion when she was 15. However, she has spoken of the influence her religious upbringing has had on the language she uses in her poetry, stating: "Poetry and prayer are very similar."

She is a lesbian, something she has known since her time at St. Joseph’s Convent School. Duffy has also expressed her discomfort of being defined by her sexuality, especially when people use it to reduce her; "If I am a lesbian icon and a role model, that's great, but if it is a word that is used to reduce me, then you have to ask why someone would want to reduce me?"

== Honours and awards ==
Duffy holds honorary doctorates from the University of Dundee, the University of Hull, the University of St Andrews, and the University of Warwick, as well as an Honorary Fellowship at Homerton College, Cambridge.

- 1983: National Poetry Competition 1st prize (for Whoever She Was)
- 1983: Greenwich Poetry Competition ("for Words of Absolution")
- 1984: Eric Gregory Award
- 1986: Scottish Arts Council Book Award (for Standing Female Nude)
- 1988: Somerset Maugham Award (for Selling Manhattan)
- 1989: Dylan Thomas Prize
- 1990: Scottish Arts Council Book Award (for The Other Country
- 1992: Cholmondeley Award
- 1993: Whitbread Awards (for Mean Time)
- 1993: Scottish Arts Council Book Award (for Mean Time)
- 1993: Forward Prize (for Mean Time)
- 1995: Lannan Literary Award
- 1999: Signal Children's Poetry Prize
- 1999: Elected a Fellow of the Royal Society of Literature
- 2001: National Endowment for Science, Technology, and the Arts Award
- 2005: T. S. Eliot Prize (for Rapture)
- 2011: Costa Book Awards (Poetry), winner, The Bees
- 2012: PEN Pinter Prize
- 2013: Assessed as one of the 100 most powerful women in the United Kingdom by Woman's Hour on BBC Radio 4.
- 2015: Elected as an Honorary Fellow of the British Academy.
- 2015: Elected as an Honorary Fellow of the Royal Society of Edinburgh
- 2021: Struga Poetry Evenings Golden Wreath Laureate

She was appointed Officer of the Order of the British Empire (OBE) in 1995, Commander of the Order of the British Empire (CBE) in 2002, and Dame Commander of the Order of the British Empire (DBE) in the 2015 New Year Honours for services to poetry.

== Works ==
- 1974: Fleshweathercock and Other Poems, Outposts Ltd.
- 1977: (with Adrian Henri) Beauty and the Beast (poetry).
- 1982: Fifth Last Song, Headland (poetry).
- 1982: Take My Husband (play)
- 1984: Cavern of Dreams (play).
- 1985: Standing Female Nude, Anvil Press Poetry (poetry).
- 1986: Little Women, Big Boys (play).
- 1986: Loss (radio play).
- 1986: Thrown Voices, Turret Books, pamphlet (poetry).
- 1987: Selling Manhattan, Anvil Press Poetry (poetry).
- 1990: The Other Country, Anvil Press Poetry (poetry).
- 1992: I Wouldn't Thank You for a Valentine (editor), Viking (poetry anthology).
- 1992: William and the Ex-Prime Minister, Anvil Press Poetry, pamphlet, (poetry).
- 1993: Mean Time Anvil Press Poetry (poetry).
- 1994: Anvil New Poets Volume 2 (editor), Penguin Books (poetry anthology).
- 1994: Selected Poems Penguin (poems).
- 1995: Penguin Modern Poets 2, with Vicki Feaver and Eavan Boland, Penguin (poetry).
- 1996: "Grimm Tales", Faber and Faber (play).
- 1996: Salmon – Carol Ann Duffy: Selected Poems, Salmon Poetry (poetry).
- 1996: Stopping for Death, Viking (poetry anthology).
- 1997: More Grimm Tales, Faber and Faber (children's play).
- 1998: The Pamphlet, Anvil Press Poetry (poetry).
- 1999: Meeting Midnight, Faber and Faber (children's poetry).
- 1999: The World's Wife, Anvil Press Poetry (poetry).
- 1999: Time's Tidings: Greeting the 21st Century (editor), Anvil Press Poetry (poetry anthology).
- 2000: The Oldest Girl in the World, Faber and Faber (children's poetry).
- 2001: Hand in Hand: An Anthology of Love Poems (editor), Picador (poetry anthology).
- 2002: Feminine Gospels, Picador.
- 2002: Queen Munch and Queen Nibble, Macmillan Children's Books.
- 2002: Underwater Farmyard, Macmillan Children's Books (children's book).
- 2003: The Good Child's Guide to Rock N Roll, Faber and Faber (children's poetry).
- 2003: Collected Grimm Tales (with Tim Supple), Faber and Faber (children's book).
- 2004: Doris the Giant (children's literature, picture book).
- 2004: New Selected Poems, Picador.
- 2004: Out of Fashion: An Anthology of Poems (editor), Faber and Faber (poetry anthology).
- 2004: Overheard on a Saltmarsh: Poets' Favourite Poems (editor), Macmillan.
- 2005: Another Night Before Christmas, with John Murray (children's poetry).
- 2005: Moon Zoo, Macmillan (children's literature, picture book).
- 2005: Rapture, Picador (poetry).
- 2006: The Lost Happy Endings (illustrated by Jane Ray), Penguin (children's book).
- 2007: Answering Back (editor), Picador (poetry anthology).
- 2007: The Hat. Faber and Faber (children's poetry).
- 2007: The Tear Thief. Barefoot Books (children's book).
- 2009: Mrs Scrooge: A Christmas Poem (illustrated by Beth Adams), Simon & Schuster.
- 2009: New & Collected Poetry for Children Faber and Faber (poetry).
- 2009: The Princess's Blankets (illustrated by Catherine Hyde). Templar (children's book).
- 2009: The Twelve Poems of Christmas (editor), Candlestick Press (poetry).
- 2009: To The Moon: An Anthology of Lunar Poetry (editor), Picador (poetry).
- 2009: Love Poems, Picador (poetry, selected).
- 2010: The Gift Barefoot Books (children's book).
- 2011: The Bees Picador (poetry, selected).
- 2011: The Christmas Truce (illustrated by David Roberts) Picador.
- 2012: Wenceslas: A Christmas Poem (illustrated by Stuart Kolakovic), Picador.
- 2014: Dorothy Wordsworth's Christmas Birthday (illustrated by Tom Duxbury), Picador.
- 2015: The Wren-Boys (illustrated by Dermot Flynn), Picador.
- 2018: Sincerity (Picador), ISBN 978-1-5098-9342-3.
- 2018: Eight World's Wives Published by Andrew J Moorhouse (Fine Press Poetry).
- 2020: "Anne Hathaway" in The Women Writers' Handbook (Aurora Metro Books)

== See also ==
- List of poets portraying sexual relations between women
