= Sasha Johnson Manning =

British singer

Sasha Johnson Manning (born 1963) is an English composer specialising in vocal pieces.

She graduated in voice and cello from the Royal Academy of Music in 1985. She has worked as a full-time soprano and composer ever since. Her singing career includes the BBC Radio 4s The Daily Service and extensive oratorio work throughout the country. She has performed across Europe and in Israel and the USA. She has worked with the Deller Consort, The Academy of St Martin in the Fields, the Britten Singers, Musical Offering and Partita.

As a composer Sasha specialises in writing for voices and held the position of composer-in-residence of the Saint Louis Chamber Chorus of Missouri for eight years, culminating in a "Requiem for St. Louis." Sasha has composed for Emma Kirkby, James Bowman, Lynne Dawson, Claron McFadden and the London Baroque. She now also sings in Saint Mary's Parish Church in Bowdon.

In 2007 she composed the music for a major new piece, The Manchester Carols, a festive suite of new carols with words by soon-to-be Poet Laureate, Carol Ann Duffy. The world premiere of The Manchester Carols took place at the Royal Northern College of Music in Manchester on 14 December 2007. The Manchester Carols were published by Faber Music in 2009.

Since 2006, when her 'Composer Residency' with the Saint Louis Chamber Chorus ended, she has continued to earn commissions from several ensembles in St. Louis, including St. Peter's Episcopal Church, Ladue, Third Baptist Church (St. Louis), Grand Center; the Music Department of Washington University in St. Louis. Several of her more recent works for the Saint Louis Chamber Chorus have been included on recordings on the Regent Records (UK), and her anthem "Out of the Deep" has been published by E. C. Schirmer, Inc.
