= Brent Assink =

Brent Assink, a Washington state native, is the former executive director of The Fuller Foundation and chief of philanthropy of Fuller Seminary, a position he assumed after concluding an 18-year tenure as executive director of the San Francisco Symphony on March 31, 2017. Assink has been musically involved since childhood, playing the piano and eventually the organ. Assink attended Dordt College in Sioux Center, Iowa where he graduated with a bachelor's degree in piano performance and business administration in 1977. He earned his master's degree in musicology from the University of Minnesota in 1981.

Assink joined the St. Paul Chamber Orchestra's (SPCO) artistic operations department in 1981. Six years later in 1987 he became the SPCO manager. In 1990, Assink became the general manager of the San Francisco Symphony, returning to the SPCO as president in 1994. In 1999, Assink became the executive director of the San Francisco Symphony, a position he held until 2017.

Assink is regularly active in several music organizations. He is a faculty member for the Orchestra Leadership Academy, and serves on the board of the League of American Orchestras as well as the Advisory Council for the University of Minnesota's School of Music. Assink resides in California with his wife Jan, with whom he has three grown children.
