= Scott Ordway =

American classical composer (born 1984)

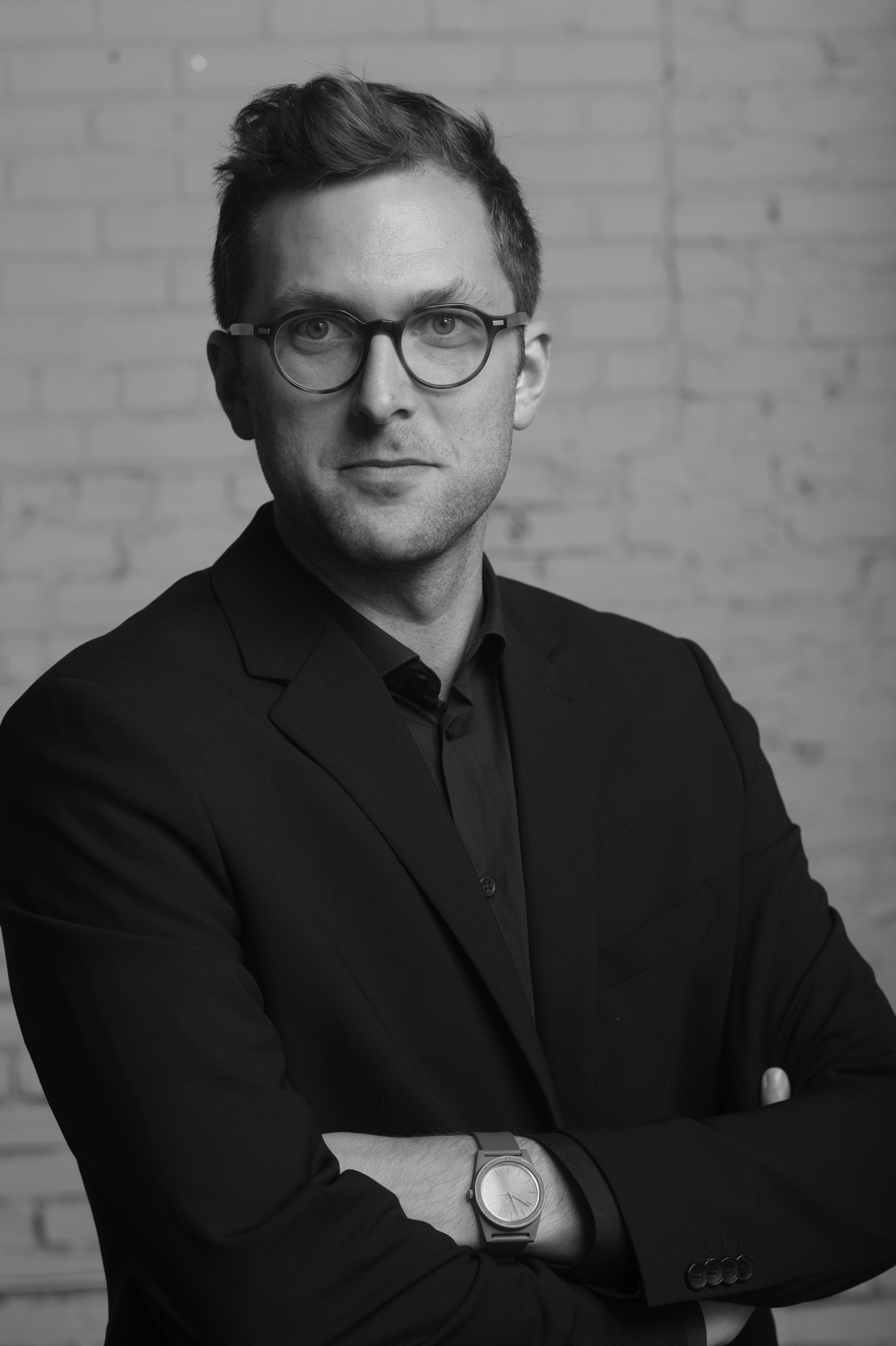
- Born: 22 March 1984; Santa Cruz, California, United States
- Education: University of Pennsylvania, University of Oregon, University of Puget Sound, Freie Universität Berlin, Accademia Chigiana

Scott Ordway (born 1984; Santa Cruz, California, United States) is an American composer, conductor, and Associate Professor of Music in the Mason Gross School of the Arts at Rutgers University. Previously, he held faculty positions at the Curtis Institute of Music and Bates College.

== Education and background ==
Scott Ordway was born and raised in Santa Cruz, California. He received his B.A. from the University of Puget Sound in 2006, followed by a master's degree from the University of Oregon in 2008. After studies in Europe at the Freie Universität Berlin and Accademia Chigiana (Siena), he received his Ph.D. from the University of Pennsylvania in 2013. His composition teachers included Robert Kyr, Jay Reise, Samuel Adler, Veljo Tormis, Anna Weesner, and James Primosch. He studied conducting with Hirvo Surva at the University of Oregon and David Hayes at the Curtis Institute of Music.

== Music ==
Ordway is the composer of three symphonies, two concert settings of the mass, numerous works for solo and ensemble voices, and more than 20 works for string quartet and other instrumental ensembles. In recent years, his work has focused on a series of large-scale, multidisciplinary compositions inspired by architecture, landscape, and the lives of cities. His work has been called “exquisite” by The New York Times, “a marvel” by The Philadelphia Inquirer, and “an American response to Sibelius” by The Boston Globe.

He has collaborated with ensembles throughout the United States and abroad, including the Buffalo Philharmonic Orchestra, Tanglewood New Fromm Players, Lorelei Ensemble, So Percussion, SOLI Chamber Ensemble, Fireworks Ensemble, Boston Musica Viva, Momenta Quartet, and Arneis Quartet.

His work has also been presented by major music festivals and institutions including the Aspen Music Festival, June in Buffalo, the Oregon Bach Festival, Hong Kong Arts Festival, Beijing Modern Music Festival, Portland Chamber Music Festival, Newburyport Chamber Music Festival, and the Hochschule für Musik Hanns Eisler in Berlin.

In 2016, a recording of his chamber music was released on Naxos Records, featuring members of the Hong Kong Philharmonic.

== Selected works ==
=== Dramatic ===
- The Outer Edge of Youth (2020)
- Tonight We Tell the Secrets of the World: A Whisper Play (2016)

=== Orchestral ===
- The End of Rain (2022)
- In the Kingdom of Bells (2018)
- Symphony No. 3 (2013)
- Foundation Music (2011)
- Symphony No. 2, "Crime in the House of Names" (2008)
- Symphony No. 1, "Les Carnavalesques" (2005)

=== Vocal ===
==== Voice with orchestra ====
- Festival Mass (2011, rev. 2013)
- Missa Brevis for the Virgin of Guadalupe (2010, rev. 2014)

==== Choir and vocal ensemble ====
- Three Kalevala Songs (2014)
- North Woods (2014)
- Dona Nobis Pacem (2010)
- Two Motets for Candlemas (2010)
- This is our Emergency (2010)
- This is the Month of Dreams (2009)

==== Solo voice ====
- Detroit (2013)
- Black is the Color (2012)
- Of Thoughtful Children, and Madmen (2008)
- It was the first time I'd left the house (in years) (2007)
- Five Moments from the Poetry of W.B. Yeats (2007)
- A Festive Rite: Three Poems by Denise Levertov (2005)

=== Chamber ===
==== String quartet ====
- Brotherly Love (2014)
- The Sky Itself Was In This Very Room (2014)
- Handshakes (2011)
- Piano Quintet No. 1 (2008)

==== Mixed ensemble ====
- The Clearing and the Forest (2019)
- Mare Vitalis: Part II "Townland" (2016)
- Mare Vitalis: Part III "Mistral" (2016)
- Composition (in brass) (2016)
- Let There Be Not Darkness But Light (2012)
- Sextet: Water Music (2010)
- Piano Quartet: Slowburn/Fastburn (2011)
- Chamber music for a mad world and a young public (2007)
- Piano Trio No. 2: We were lost, but there was laughter there (2007)
- Rhythmic Music (2006)
- Concert Music for Guitar Quartet (2006)

==== Solo and duo ====
- Nineteen Movements for Unaccompanied Cello (2018)
- Mare Vitalis: Part I "Breathmark" (2016)
- Tell It Like a Secret (2016)
- On April 18, 2015, I Flew Over the North Pole (2015)
- Introduction & Toccata (2010)
- Viola Sonata: The Dreams We Dream for the City of Roses (2009)
- Survival Forms (2008)
- Six Vignettes (2007)
- Six Concert Etudes (2006)
