= Clare Maclean =

New Zealand composer

Clare Maclean (born 1958) is a New Zealand composer.

== Early life and education ==
Born in Timaru, Maclean received her formative musical training under Gillian Bibby at the Wellington Polytechnic. She then moved to Australia, where she studied composition in Sydney with Peter Sculthorpe. Singing with the Sydney University Chamber Choir under the direction of Nicholas Routley introduced her to the intricate Renaissance polyphony that affected her early compositions.

== Career ==
In 1985 Maclean composed Christ the King, a setting of New Zealand poet James K. Baxter, which has received numerous performances in both Australia and North America, as well as several recordings. Conceived as several interpolations for a performance of John Taverner's "Westron Wynde" Mass, the composer subsequently tied them together to create a single work that combines elements of plainchant and hymnody with polyphonic passages. The composer's ingenious weaving and re-ordering of two Baxter poems, 'Song to the Father' and 'Song to the Lord God on a Spring Morning,’ was an early indication (in 1984) of her acute sensitivity to text, a trait that runs through all her subsequent works. In the same year, Maclean also revised four solo settings of Baxter’s verse. Over the next four years she composed two other major commissions for the Sydney Chamber Choir, "Et Misericordia" (1986) and "A West Irish Ballad" (1988). These three works formed the basis for a CD devoted entirely to her music, performed by the Sydney Chamber Choir and released in 1995 on the Tall Poppies label (TP 073).

During the 1990s Maclean continued to absorb and process a wide range of influences, from the aleatoric effects in "Hope There Is" (1990), to the use of folksong and chant in Leise rieselt der Schnee (1996). Other significant works from this period include "Love Was His Meaning" (1992) and "We Welcome Summer" (1996). Music from this period reveals Maclean's growing use of repetitive, almost hypnotic phrases, as well as the overlaying of different rhythms and even text. Nowhere is this more apparent than the short piece, commissioned for the Sydney Children's Choir, titled "Rain" that comprises a series of onomatopoeic syllables to suggest a rain shower.

Since her early success Maclean has continued to write to commission, but her appeal has extended beyond her 'alma mater,’ the Sydney Chamber Choir that had evolved from its original association with the university. She has written for The Macquarie Singers, the Tasmanian Consort (1990), and The Australian Voices of Brisbane (1995). She wrote her 2002 setting of "Aunque Es De Noche" for the Sydney Philharmonia Chorus, and in 2003 she wrote "In The Year That King Uzziah Died" for the Adelaide-based vocal quartet, SYNTONY. More recently, her orchestral work "Panah" was selected as one of the New Zealand Symphony Orchestra's Readings in 2008, under the direction of conductor Scott Parkman.

In an odd twist of coincidence, Parkman had previously served as Assistant Conductor of the St. Louis Symphony Orchestra (USA), a city that has hosted more Maclean performances and commissions than any other. This is explained by the relationship Clare Maclean has enjoyed with the Saint Louis Chamber Chorus, a professional chamber choir for which she has served as Composer-in-Residence since 2005. For this ensemble she composed first "Os Anthos Chortou: As the flowers of grass"– setting Sappho in the original ancient Greek; then in 2007 "Misera ancor do Loco" (a conclusion in Italian to Monteverdi's fragmentary sequence, "Lamento d'Arianna," 2007) and "Vive in Deo!" (a series of ancient Greek and Latin epitaphs) and Psalm 137 (in Hebrew, 2009). The St Louis Chamber Chorus has also recorded several of her works on compact disc. Future commissions for this choir include performances in November 2009 and December 2010. At the APRA Music Awards of 2012 she won an Art Music Award in the category Work of the Year – Vocal or Choral for Osanna Mass.

== Recordings ==
- Clare Maclean, the Complete choral music. The Sydney Chamber Choir, conducted by Nicholas Routley. Tall Poppies, Sydney, Australia, TP073, 1995
- Australia Sings a New Song (Hope There is, sung by the Sydney Chamber Choir, conducted by Nicholas Routley). Australian National Choral Association ANCACD1001, 1996
- The Listening Land (We Welcome Summer). The Australian Voices, conducted by Graeme Morton. Australian Voices, Brisbane, Australia, VOICESCD002, 1996
- Our Time and Place (Hope There Is). The St Peter's Chorale, conducted by Graeme Morton. The St Peter's Chorale, Brisbane, Australia, 1997
- Different Angels: Contemporary Australian Choir Music (Christ the King; Et Misericordia). The Adelaide Chamber Singers, conducted by Carl Crossin. The Adelaide Chamber Singers, Australia, ACSCD 002, 1998
- O Magnum Mysterium (Christ the King). The Adelaide Chamber Singers, conducted by Carl Crossin. The Adelaide Chamber Singers, Australia
- One World, Many Voices (Hope There Is, sung by the Sydney Chamber Choir). Earthsongs, Corvallis, Oregon, CD 02, 1998
- One (Christ the King). Ensemble de la Rue, conducted by William Kempster. Arktos Recordings ltd, CD 20041, 2000
- Evensong from York Minster (Christ the King). The Brighton School Choir. Brighton School, Adelaide, Australia, 2000
- Rejoicing in His Birth (Leise Rieselt der Schnee). The St Louis Chamber Chorus, conducted by Philip Barnes. The St Louis Chamber Chorus, SLCC 007, 2003
- The Sydney Chamber Choir and Kampin Laulu Chamber Choir, Finland (We Welcome Summer). ABC Classic FM, Sydney, Australia, 2003
- Resonance: Contemporary Choral Music from Australia and the United States (Christ the King). University of New Hampshire Singers, conducted by William Kempster. University of New Hampshire Music Department, UNHCS 0104, 2004
- Songs of the Soul (Aunque es de Noche). The St Louis Chamber Chorus, conducted by Philip Barnes. Guild GmbH, Switzerland, GMCD 7272, 2005
- Jo-Wha (Oneness) (Kyrie, sung by the Sydney Chamber Choir, conducted by Paul Stanhope). Publications by Wirripang, Wollongong, Australia, 2006
- Music for the Soul Lumina Vocal Ensemble conducted by Anna Pope (Christ the King), Adelaide, South Australia, Australia, LVE001 2007
- St. Louis Commissions (Os Anthos Chortou: As the flowers of grass). The St Louis Chamber Chorus, conducted by Philip Barnes. Regent Records, Great Britain, REGCD 255, 2008
- Australian Soundscapes Lumina Vocal Ensemble conducted by Anna Pope (Hope there is and Rain) Adelaide, South Australia, Australia, LVE005, 2009
- Osanna (Osanna Mass, In the Year That King Uzziah Died, os anthos chortou, Vive in Deo, We Welcome Summer". Sydney Chamber Choir conducted by Paul Stanhope. Tall Poppies, Sydney Australia, TP218 2011.
