= Jack Sheen =

American facial plastic surgeon

- Born: 2 April 1925
- Died: 19 April 2021 (aged 96); Santa Barbara, California
- Education: Stanford University; Stanford University School of Medicine
- Years active: 1964–2003
- Spouse: Anitra
- Children: 3
- Medical career
- Profession: Surgeon
- Institutions: Cook County Hospital; University of California, Los Angeles; University of Southern California
- Sub-specialties: rhinoplasty; Reconstructiive surgery; Facial plastic and reconstructive surgery
- Notable works: “Aesthetic Rhinoplasty”

Jack H. Sheen, MD (1925–2021) was an American facial plastic surgeon, author, and educator. He was best known for his modern rhinoplasty techniques and textbook "Aesthetic Rhinoplasty" and for developing advanced methods that transformed nasal surgery into a more predictable and aesthetic procedure.

== Early life ==
Jack Sheen was born on April 2, 1925 son of John and Victoria (née Basmajian) Sheen, Armenian immigrants. He had a sister Betty and a brother Edward. By 1913 John Sheen emigrated from Turkey before the Armenian Genocide, moving to America where he established a carpentry business with a factory building furniture for churches. Settling in California, Jack Sheen grew up in Altadena, California.

== Second World War ==
During the Second World War, Sheen enlisted in the US Navy and served on the USS Biddle, a troop carrier in the South Pacific where, in a bunk next to the Commander, he was responsible for transmitting and receiving communications in Morse code.He was involved in the Battle of Leyte Gulf and battle of Midway Island.

== Education ==
Sheen attended Stanford University, graduating in 1951 and continued graduating from Stanford University School of Medicine in 1955. At Cook County Hospital, Chicago, Sheen was an OB-GYN Resident for one year, followed by three years of general practice and completing training in Plastic surgery in 1964.

== Career ==
In his rhinoplasty practice, Sheen developed and refined techniques that enabled the correction of nasal deformities previously regarded as impossible to repair. At the Millard Symposium in 1975, he demonstrated the use of dorsal grafts and tip grafts to correct a supratip deformity on a previously operated nose, now standard practice.

In 1981, Sheen became Associate Clinical Professor of Surgery, Division of Plastic Surgery at University of California, Los Angeles. In 1988, Sheen also became Clinical Professor of Surgery, Section of Plastic and Reconstructive Surgery at University of Southern California.

Sheen was an aesthetic and reconstructive facial plastic surgery. His two–volume textbook, "Aesthetic Rhinoplasty", co–authored with Anitra Peebles Sheen, is a widely-cite reference work in the field.

Sheen lectured internationally and trained surgeons. His video teaching collections, including the "Sheen Rhinoplasty Video Library," are used in board review courses and plastic surgery training programs.

== Publications ==
- "Aesthetic Rhinoplasty" (1998), with Anitra Peebles Sheen.

== Legacy ==
Sheen’s work has been widely credited with shaping contemporary approaches to facial plastic surgery. Colleagues and obituaries described him as an influential and pioneering figure in the field.
