= Jacob Cooper (composer) =

American composer

- Born: Jacob Mauney Cooper
- Genres: Contemporary classical, electronic, experimental music
- Occupations: Composer, educator
- Years active: 2005–present
- Label: Nonesuch Records
- Website: www.jacobcoopermusic.com

Jacob Mauney Cooper is an American composer living in Philadelphia, Pennsylvania.

== Biography ==
After attending Amherst College for his bachelor's degree in both geology and music, Cooper completed his graduate studies in composition at the Yale School of Music, and later formed the composers’ collective Sleeping Giant with several of his classmates. His works have been performed by the Calder Quartet, JACK Quartet, Eighth Blackbird, Minnesota Orchestra, Albany Symphony Orchestra, Ensemble ACJW, NOW Ensemble, Dither Quartet, Living Earth Show, Carmina Slovenica, Mellissa Hughes, Timo Andres, Theo Bleckmann, Jodie Landau, Ashley Bathgate, and Vicky Chow.

Cooper's national awards include a Music Alive Residency Award from New Music USA, a Charles Ives Scholarship from the American Academy of Arts and Letters, and a Morton Gould Young Composer Award from ASCAP. He was also the winner of the 2011 Carsblad Music Festival Composers’ Competition and has been hailed by the New York Times as "richly talented" and by The New Yorker as a "maverick song composer."

Cooper is an associate professor at West Chester University and previously served on the faculty at Amherst College.

== Works ==
Cooper's largest projects include Silver Threads, a song cycle for voice and electronic track released by Nonesuch Records, and Ripple the Sky, a work for voice and processed string octet commissioned by the Los Angeles Philharmonic Association. These works highlight Cooper's focus on slow development and the stretching of musical time. Many of Cooper's compositions involve live processing and electronics, and his interest in the digital realm extends to visual media: his video series Triptych was screened at the 2012 MATA Festival, and his piece Commencer une autre mort was shortlisted for the Guggenheim exhibit YouTube Play: A Biennial of Creative Video (2010).

== Compositions and projects ==
Opera and vocal/theater

- Threnos (for the Throat) (2017–20) for processed women's choir with electronic track
- Timberbrit (2008, revised 2010) for male vocalist, female vocalist, guitar, keyboard, drumset, and laptop

Orchestral / large ensemble

- Sanctus (2015) for orchestra and SATB choir
- Serenade (2013) for 2 vocalists and 16 instrumentalists
- Stabat Mater Dolorosa (2009) for string orchestra and 4 amplified voices
- Odradek (2006) for full orchestra

Chamber

- Terrain (2020) for 2 vocalists and cello
- Air I and Air II (2016) for percussion quartet
- Ripple the Sky (2016) for voice and string octet
- Pasturing I and Pasturing II (2014) for guitar and percussion / drum set
- Cast (2014) for chamber ensemble
- Agitated, stumbling, like an endless run-on sentence (2011) for cl, bsn, tpt, tbn, perc, vln, db
- bad black bottom kind (2011, rev. 2013) for string quartet
- Cello Octet (2010)

Solo (and solo with electronic track / laptop)

- Three pieces for Trombone and Trombone Track (2019)
- Expiation (2018) for voice with electronic track
- Ley Line (2016) for solo cello
- Silver Threads (2011–13) song cycle for voice with electronic track
- La Plus Que Plus Que Lente (2013) for piano with laptop
- Arches (2012) for cello with laptop
- Clifton Gates (2011) for piano with laptop
- Alter Ad Alterum (2011) for accordion with laptop
- Not Just Another Piece for Solo Bass Drum (2005)

Video

- Triptych:
  - Commencer une autre mort (2010)
  - Black or White (2012)
  - Alla stagion dei fior (2012)

== Recordings ==
Full albums

- Terrain (New Amsterdam Records, 2020)
- Silver Threads (Nonesuch Records, 2014) with Mellissa Hughes, soprano

Featured on

- The String Orchestra of Brooklyn's afterimage (Furious Artisans, 2020), Stabat Mater Dolorosa
- Ashley Bathgate's Ash (New Amsterdam Records, 2019), Ley Line
- Eighth Blackbird's Hand Eye (Cedille Records, 2016), Cast
- The Living Earth Show's Dance Music (New Amsterdam Records, 2016), Pasturing II
- Vicky Chow's A O R T A (New Amsterdam Records, 2016), Clifton Gates
- Kathleen Supové's The Debussy Effect (New Focus Recordings, 2016), La plus que plus que lente
