= Catherine Kontz =

Luxembourgish composer

Catherine Kontz (born 1976) is a Luxembourgish composer, director and performer. Her work is often multidisciplinary, incorporating elements of space, theatre, and nonlinearity.

She studied composition with Roger Redgate at Goldsmiths, University of London, where she received her doctorate for research into the relationship between Deleuzian theory, mime opera, Lynchian cinema and Kabuki. This led to the creation of the mime opera, MiE, which premiered at The Space in London in 2006.

In 2013, she composed and directed the opera Neige, based on the book by Maxence Fermine, at the Grand Théâtre de Luxembourg. Her work has been premiered by the BBC Scottish Symphony Orchestra, Exaudi and ensemble recherche, and she performs herself as part of the progressive pop outfit French for Cartridge.
