= List of cover versions of Beatles songs =

This is a list of cover versions by music artists who have recorded one or more songs written and originally recorded by English rock band the Beatles. Many albums have been created in dedication to the group, including film soundtracks, such as I Am Sam (2001) and Across the Universe (2007) and commemorative albums such as Sgt. Pepper Knew My Father (1988) and This Bird Has Flown (2005).

Artists who have covered songs from the solo careers of the Beatles' members John Lennon, George Harrison, Paul McCartney and Ringo Starr are not included; re-recordings of Beatles songs by the former Beatles; and songs which the Beatles covered are also not included. Non-Beatles songs credited to Lennon–McCartney are also not included.

== List ==
| Artist | Song | Year | Release |
|---|---|---|---|
| 7B | "And I Love Her" | 2003 | Exotica Versus The Beatles |
| 801 | "Tomorrow Never Knows" | 1976 | 801 Live |
| 10cc | "Across the Universe" | 1995 | 10cc Alive |
| 10cc | "Paperback Writer" | 1993 | Live in Concert Vol. 2 |
| The 12 cellists of the Berlin Philharmonic | "Yellow Submarine" | 1983 | The Beatles In Classics |
| The 12 cellists of the Berlin Philharmonic | "Let It Be" | 1983 | The Beatles In Classics |
| The 12 cellists of the Berlin Philharmonic | "Something" | 1983 | The Beatles In Classics |
| The 12 cellists of the Berlin Philharmonic | "The Fool On the Hill" | 1983 | The Beatles In Classics |
| The 12 cellists of the Berlin Philharmonic | "Help!" | 1983 | The Beatles In Classics |
| The 12 cellists of the Berlin Philharmonic | "Yesterday" | 1983 | The Beatles In Classics |
| The 12 cellists of the Berlin Philharmonic | "Michelle" | 1983 | The Beatles In Classics |
| The 12 cellists of the Berlin Philharmonic | "A Hard Day's Night" | 1983 | The Beatles In Classics |
| The 12 cellists of the Berlin Philharmonic | "Norwegian Wood" | 1983 | The Beatles In Classics |
| The 12 cellists of the Berlin Philharmonic | "Here, There and Everywhere" | 1983 | The Beatles In Classics |
| The 12 cellists of the Berlin Philharmonic | "Can't Buy Me Love" | 1983 | The Beatles In Classics |
| The 12 cellists of the Berlin Philharmonic | "Hey Jude" | 1983 | The Beatles In Classics |
| The 5th Dimension | "Ticket to Ride" | 1967 | The Magic Garden |
| The 5th Dimension | "I've Got a Feeling" | 1975 | Earthbound |
| Themis Adamantidis | "Yesterday" | 1980 | Agapise Me |
| Bryan Adams | "Any Time at All" | 2014 | Tracks of My Years |
| Bryan Adams | "Sgt. Pepper's Lonely Hearts Club Band" | 2007 | Sgt. Pepper's Lonely Hearts Club Band – 40th Anniversary BBC Broadcast |
| Aerosmith | "Helter Skelter" | 1975 | Pandora's Box (released 1991) |
| Aerosmith | "Come Together" | 1978 | Sgt. Pepper's Lonely Hearts Club Band, at Download Festival 2014 |
| Aerosmith | "I'm Down" | 1987 | Permanent Vacation |
| The Aggrolites | "Don't Let Me Down" | 2011 | Unleashed Live Vol. 1 |
| Agua De Annique | "Across the Universe" | 2007 | (live performance) |
| Agua De Annique | "Blackbird" | 2007 | (live performance) |
| Air Supply | "The Long and Winding Road" | 2009 | Abbey Road: A Tribute to the Beatles |
| Alarm Will Sound | "Revolution 9" | 2016 | Modernists |
| Monty Alexander | "Let It Be" | 2010 | Beatles Vs. Stones |
| Alice | "The Fool on the Hill" | 1987 | Elisir |
| Alice Donut | "Helter Skelter" | 1994 | Dry-Humping the Cash Cow |
| Kris Allen | "Come Together" | 2009 | American Idol Top 4 |
| Sasha Allen | "Oh! Darling" | 2013 | The Voice season 4 performance |
| Allister | "I Saw Her Standing There" | 2006 | Guilty Pleasures |
| Aloe Blacc | "Rain" | 2016 | The Beat Bugs: Complete Season 1 |
| Herb Alpert & The Tijuana Brass | "All My Loving" | 1964 | South of the Border |
| Herb Alpert & The Tijuana Brass | "I'll Be Back" | 1969 | The Brass are Comin |
| Herb Alpert & The Tijuana Brass | "With a Little Help from My Friends" | 1967 | Herb Alpert's Ninth |
| Herb Alpert & The Tijuana Brass | "Martha My Dear" | 1971 | Summertime |
| Herb Alpert & The Tijuana Brass | "Ob-La-Di, Ob-La-Da" | 1969 | Warm |
| Alvin and the Chipmunks | "A Hard Day's Night" | 1964 | The Chipmunks Sing the Beatles Hits |
| Alvin and the Chipmunks | "P.S. I Love You" | 1964 | The Chipmunks Sing the Beatles Hits |
| Alvin and the Chipmunks | "I Saw Her Standing There" | 1964 | The Chipmunks Sing the Beatles Hits |
| Alvin and the Chipmunks | "Can't Buy Me Love" | 1964 | The Chipmunks Sing the Beatles Hits |
| Alvin and the Chipmunks | "Please Please Me" | 1964 | The Chipmunks Sing the Beatles Hits |
| Alvin and the Chipmunks | "I Want to Hold Your Hand" | 1964 | The Chipmunks Sing the Beatles Hits |
| Alvin and the Chipmunks | "All My Loving" | 1964 | The Chipmunks Sing the Beatles Hits |
| Alvin and the Chipmunks | "Do You Want to Know a Secret" | 1964 | The Chipmunks Sing the Beatles Hits |
| Alvin and the Chipmunks | "She Loves You" | 1964 | The Chipmunks Sing the Beatles Hits |
| Alvin and the Chipmunks | "From Me to You" | 1964 | The Chipmunks Sing the Beatles Hits |
| Alvin and the Chipmunks | "Love Me Do" | 1964 | The Chipmunks Sing the Beatles Hits |
| Alvin and the Chipmunks | "When I'm Sixty-Four" | 1984 | Alvin and the Chipmunks episode "The Picture of Health" |
| Alvin and the Chipmunks | "Help!" | 1986 | Alvin and the Chipmunks episode "Simon Seville, Superstar" |
| Alvin and the Chipmunks and The Chipettes | "Help!" | 2011 | Alvin and the Chipmunks: Chipwrecked: Music from the Motion Picture |
| AM & Tina Dico | "While My Guitar Gently Weeps" | 2008 | Side by Side: Duets, Vol. 1 |
| Ambrosia | "Magical Mystery Tour" | 1976 | All This and World War II (Soundtrack) |
| Amen Corner | "Get Back" | 1969 | Farewell to the Real Magnificent Seven (also released as a single) |
| Amen Corner | "Penny Lane" | 1969 | Live performance on The National Welsh Coast Live Explosion Company |
| Tori Amos | "Happiness Is a Warm Gun" | 2001 | Strange Little Girls |
| Tori Amos | "Let It Be" | | 2003-08-09 Minneapolis, MN – Disc 1 |
| Tori Amos | "She's Leaving Home" | | Tori Stories (Disc 3) |
| Tori Amos | "Something" | | |
| Tori Amos | "With a Little Help from My Friends" | | Wharton Theater, East Lansing, Mi 10-16-94 "I Touch Myself" boot |
| Tori Amos | "Here, There and Everywhere" | | |
| Anathema | "Eleanor Rigby" | | (Live performance) |
| Thomas Anders | "Michelle" | 1995 | Souled |
| Joe Anderson | "With a Little Help from My Friends" | 2007 | Across the Universe: Music from the motion Picture |
| Joe Anderson | "I Want You (She's So Heavy)" | 2007 | Across the Universe: Music from the motion Picture |
| Joe Anderson | "Happiness Is a Warm Gun" | 2007 | Across the Universe: Music from the motion Picture |
| Joe Anderson | "Hey Jude" | 2007 | Across the Universe: Music from the motion Picture |
| Joe Anderson | "Come Together" | 2007 | Across the Universe: Music from the motion Picture |
| Joe Anderson | "Strawberry Fields Forever" | 2007 | Across the Universe: Music from the motion Picture |
| Andre 3000 | "All Together Now" | 2012 | single |
| Anima Sound System | "Revolution" | 2009 | We Strike! |
| Marc Anthony | "Lucy in the Sky with Diamonds" | 2001 | Come Together: A Night for John Lennon's Words and Music |
| Fiona Apple | "Across the Universe" | 1998 | Pleasantville (soundtrack) |
| The Applejacks | "Like Dreamers Do" | 1964 | single |
| The Applejacks | "Baby's in Black" | 1965 | The Lord's Taverners Charity Album |
| April Wine | "Tell Me Why" | 1982 | Power Play |
| David Archuleta | "We Can Work It Out" | 2008 | American Idol performance |
| David Archuleta | "The Long and Winding Road" | 2008 | American Idol performance |
| Arctic Monkeys | "Come Together" | 2012 | Olympic Games Opening Ceremony |
| Aritzia | "Yesterday" (Ayer) | 1995 | Hey Jude (Tributo A Los Beatles) |
| Billie Joe Armstrong | "Across the Universe" | 2005 | 47th Grammy Awards |
| Arno (Arno Hintjens) | "Drive My Car" | 2008 | Covers Cocktail |
| P. P. Arnold | "Eleanor Rigby" | 1968 | Kafunta |
| P. P. Arnold | "Yesterday" | 1968 | Kafunta |
| Daniel Ash | "Day Tripper" | 1991 | Coming Down |
| Dorothy Ashby | "The Fool on the Hill" | 1969 | Dorothy's Harp |
| Dorothy Ashby | "Yesterday" | 1984 | Concierto de Aranjuez |
| Assagai | "Hey Jude" | 1971 | Assagai |
| Susan Ashton & Gary Chapman | "In My Life" | 1995 | Come Together: America Salutes The Beatles |
| Athlete | "Lucy in the Sky with Diamonds" | 2007 | Sgt. Pepper's Lonely Hearts Club Band – 40th Anniversary BBC Broadcast |
| Chet Atkins | "I Feel Fine" | 1966 | Chet Atkins Picks on the Beatles |
| Chet Atkins | "Yesterday" | 1966 | Chet Atkins Picks on the Beatles |
| Chet Atkins | "If I Fell" | 1966 | Chet Atkins Picks on the Beatles |
| Chet Atkins | "Can't Buy Me Love" | 1966 | Chet Atkins Picks on the Beatles |
| Chet Atkins | "I'll Cry Instead" | 1966 | Chet Atkins Picks on the Beatles |
| Chet Atkins | "Things We Said Today" | 1966 | Chet Atkins Picks on the Beatles |
| Chet Atkins | "A Hard Day's Night" | 1966 | Chet Atkins Picks on the Beatles |
| Chet Atkins | "I'll Follow the Sun" | 1966 | Chet Atkins Picks on the Beatles |
| Chet Atkins | "She's a Woman" | 1966 | Chet Atkins Picks on the Beatles |
| Chet Atkins | "And I Love Her" | 1966 | Chet Atkins Picks on the Beatles |
| Chet Atkins | "Michelle" | 1966 | Chet Atkins Picks on the Beatles |
| Chet Atkins | "She Loves You" | 1966 | Chet Atkins Picks on the Beatles |
| Atomic Kitten | "Ticket to Ride" | 2007 | (Live performance) |
| Jean-Louis Aubert | "Norwegian Wood (This Bird Has Flown)" | 1998 | Concert privé |
| Hugues Aufray | "Yesterday" (Je croyais) | 1965 | L'homme orchestre (single) |
| Emilie Autumn | "All My Loving" | 2007 | A Bit O' This & That |
| Ayreon | "When I'm Sixty-Four" | 2005 | Come Back to Me (CD Single) |
| Pedro Aznar | "Across the Universe" | 1986 | Fotos De Tokyo |
| Pedro Aznar | "I Am the Walrus" | 2013 | Mil noches y un instante |
| Pedro Aznar | "Strawberry Fields" | 2013 | Mil noches y un instante |
| Pedro Aznar | "Because" | 2013 | Mil noches y un instante |
| Pedro Aznar | "Blackbird" | 2013 | Mil noches y un instante |
| Pedro Aznar | "Eleanor Rigby" | | |
| Pedro Aznar | "For No One" | | |
| Pedro Aznar | "Glass Onion" | | |
| Pedro Aznar | "I'm Looking Through You" | | |
| Pedro Aznar | "Julia" | | |
| Pedro Aznar | "Michelle" | 2013 | Mil noches y un instante |
| Pedro Aznar | "Norwegian Wood (This Bird Has Flown)" | | |
| Pedro Aznar | "Revolution" | | |
| Pedro Aznar | "She's Leaving Home" | | |
| Pedro Aznar | "Tomorrow Never Knows" | 2009 | Quebrado Vivo |
| Pedro Aznar | "While My Guitar Gently Weeps" | 2010 | A Solas Con El Mundo |
| Pedro Aznar | "You Never Give Me Your Money" | | |
| B5 | "Let It Be" | 2005 | B5 |
| The B-52's | "Paperback Writer" | 1979 | |
| Babyshambles | "She Loves You" | 2010 | |
| Babyshambles | "Free as a Bird" | 2007 | |
| Bad Brains | "Day Tripper" | 1990 | The Youth Are Getting Restless |
| Bad Company | "Ticket to Ride"/"I Feel Fine" | 2002 | During their 2002 tour, the ending of the song "Rock and Roll Fantasy" would segue into a small medley of these two songs. This can be heard on their live album Merchants of Cool. |
| Joan Baez | "Eleanor Rigby" | 1967 | Joan |
| Joan Baez | "Let It Be" | 1970 | Isle of Wight Festival 1970 |
| David Ball | "I'll Follow the Sun" | 1995 | Come Together: America Salutes The Beatles |
| Kenny Ball | "When I'm Sixty-Four" | 1967 | single |
| Bananarama | "Help!" | 1989 | single |
| Carl Barât & Pete Doherty | "A Day in the Life" | 2007 | Sgt. Pepper's Lonely Hearts Club Band – 40th Anniversary BBC Broadcast |
| Carl Barât | "Eight Days A Week" | | |
| Sara Bareilles | "Oh! Darling" | 2008 | Live from Abbey Road |
| Barnes & Barnes | "Please Please Me" | 1996 | Voobaha |
| Count Basie | "Help!" | 1966 | Basie's Beatle Bag |
| Count Basie | "Can't Buy Me Love" | 1966 | Basie's Beatle Bag |
| Count Basie | "Michelle" | 1966 | Basie's Beatle Bag |
| Count Basie | "I Wanna Be Your Man" | 1966 | Basie's Beatle Bag |
| Count Basie | "Do You Want to Know a Secret" | 1966 | Basie's Beatle Bag |
| Count Basie | "A Hard Day's Night" | 1966 | Basie's Beatle Bag |
| Count Basie | "All My Loving" | 1966 | Basie's Beatle Bag |
| Count Basie | "Yesterday" | 1966 | Basie's Beatle Bag |
| Count Basie | "And I Love Her" | 1966 | Basie's Beatle Bag |
| Count Basie | "Hold Me Tight" | 1966 | Basie's Beatle Bag |
| Count Basie | "She Loves You" | 1966 | Basie's Beatle Bag |
| Count Basie | "Norwegian Wood (This Bird Has Flown)" | 1970 | Basie on the Beatles |
| Count Basie | "The Fool on the Hill" | 1970 | Basie on the Beatles |
| Count Basie | "Something" | 1970 | Basie on the Beatles |
| Count Basie | "With a Little Help from My Friends" | 1970 | Basie on the Beatles |
| Count Basie | "Here, There and Everywhere" | 1970 | Basie on the Beatles |
| Count Basie | "Get Back" | 1970 | Basie on the Beatles |
| Count Basie | "Hey Jude" | 1970 | Basie on the Beatles |
| Count Basie | "Eleanor Rigby" | 1970 | Basie on the Beatles |
| Count Basie | "Penny Lane" | 1970 | Basie on the Beatles |
| Count Basie | "Come Together" | 1970 | Basie on the Beatles |
| Count Basie | "Yesterday" | 1970 | Basie on the Beatles |
| Shirley Bassey | "Something" | 1970 | Something |
| Shirley Bassey | "The Fool on the Hill" | 1971 | single |
| Shirley Bassey | "Yesterday" | 1991 | Keep the Music Playing |
| Bathory | "I'm Only Sleeping" | 2006 | In Memory of Quorthon |
| The Beach Boys | "I Should Have Known Better" | 1965 | Beach Boys' Party! |
| The Beach Boys | "Tell Me Why" | 1965 | Beach Boys' Party! |
| The Beach Boys | "You've Got to Hide Your Love Away" | 1965 | Beach Boys' Party! |
| The Beach Boys | "With a Little Help from My Friends" | 1983 | Rarities |
| Beady Eye | "Across the Universe" | 2011 | Single (Charity Download in Aid Of Japanese Tsunami Appeal) |
| Beastie Boys | "I'm Down" | 1986 | recorded for "Licensed to Ill", but not included |
| Beat Bugs | "All You Need Is Love" | 2016 | The Beat Bugs: Complete Season 1 |
| Beat Bugs | "Help!" | 2016 | The Beat Bugs: Complete Season 1 |
| Beat Bugs | "I Am the Walrus" | 2016 | The Beat Bugs: Complete Season 1 |
| Beat Bugs | "Come Together" | 2016 | The Beat Bugs: Complete Season 1 |
| Beat Bugs | "Sun King" | 2016 | The Beat Bugs: Complete Season 1 |
| Beat Bugs | "Penny Lane" | 2016 | The Beat Bugs: Complete Season 1 |
| Beat Bugs | "Birthday" | 2016 | The Beat Bugs: Complete Season 1 |
| Beat Bugs | "I've Just Seen a Face" | 2016 | The Beat Bugs: Complete Season 1 |
| Beat Bugs | "When I'm Sixty-Four" | 2016 | The Beat Bugs: Complete Season 1 |
| Beat Bugs | "Doctor Robert" | 2016 | The Beat Bugs: Complete Season 1 |
| Beat Bugs | "Ticket to Ride" | 2016 | The Beat Bugs: Complete Season 1 |
| Beat Bugs | "Being for the Benefit of Mr. Kite!" | 2016 | The Beat Bugs: Complete Season 1 |
| Beat Bugs | "You've Got to Hide Your Love Away" | 2016 | The Beat Bugs: Complete Season 1 |
| Beat Bugs | "Day Tripper" | 2016 | The Beat Bugs: Complete Season 1 |
| Beat Bugs | "Why Don't We Do It in the Road?" | 2016 | The Beat Bugs: Complete Season 1 |
| Beat Bugs | "Glass Onion" | 2016 | The Beat Bugs: Complete Season 1 |
| Beat Bugs | "Carry That Weight" | 2016 | The Beat Bugs: Complete Season 1 |
| Beat Bugs | "Yellow Submarine" | 2016 | The Beat Bugs: Complete Season 2 |
| Beat Bugs | "I Call Your Name" | 2016 | The Beat Bugs: Complete Season 2 |
| Beat Bugs | "With a Little Help from My Friends" | 2016 | The Beat Bugs: Complete Season 2 |
| Beat Bugs | "Get Back" | 2016 | The Beat Bugs: Complete Season 2 |
| Beat Bugs | "There's a Place" | 2016 | The Beat Bugs: Complete Season 2 |
| Beat Bugs | "We Can Work It Out" | 2016 | The Beat Bugs: Complete Season 2 |
| Beat Bugs | "Sgt. Pepper's Lonely Heart Club Band" | 2016 | The Beat Bugs: Complete Season 2 |
| Beat Bugs | "Christmas Time (Is Here Again)" | 2016 | The Beat Bugs: Complete Season 2 |
| Beat Bugs | "Drive My Car" | 2016 | The Beat Bugs: Complete Season 2 |
| Beat Bugs | "Tomorrow Never Knows" | 2016 | The Beat Bugs: Complete Season 2 |
| Beat Bugs | "Nowhere Man" | 2016 | The Beat Bugs: Complete Season 2 |
| Beat Bugs | "Strawberry Fields Forever" | 2016 | The Beat Bugs: Complete Season 2 |
| Beat Bugs | "The Fool on the Hill" | 2016 | The Beat Bugs: Complete Season 2 |
| Beat Bugs | "And Your Bird Can Sing" | 2016 | The Beat Bugs: Complete Season 2 |
| Beat Bugs | "I'll Follow the Sun" | 2016 | The Beat Bugs: Complete Season 2 |
| Beat Bugs | "Got to Get You into My Life" | 2016 | The Beat Bugs: Complete Season 2 |
| Beat Bugs | "Eleanor Rigby" | 2016 | The Beat Bugs: Complete Season 2 |
| Beat Bugs | "I'm So Tired" | 2016 | The Beat Bugs: Complete Season 2 |
| Beat Bugs | "Hey Bulldog" | 2016 | The Beat Bugs: Complete Season 2 |
| Beat Bugs | "I'm Happy Just to Dance with You" | 2016 | The Beat Bugs: Complete Season 2 |
| Beat Bugs | "It Won't Be Long" | 2016 | The Beat Bugs: Complete Season 2 |
| Beat Bugs | "Anytime at All" | 2016 | The Beat Bugs: Complete Season 2 |
| Beat Bugs | "Across the Universe" | 2016 | The Beat Bugs: Complete Season 2 |
| Beat Bugs | "Hey Bulldog" | 2016 | The Beat Bugs: Complete Season 3 |
| Beat Bugs | "Here Comes the Sun" | 2018 | The Beat Bugs: Complete Season 3 |
| Beat Bugs | "You Won't See Me" | 2018 | The Beat Bugs: Complete Season 3 |
| Beat Bugs | "Let It Be" | 2018 | The Beat Bugs: Complete Season 3 |
| Beat Bugs | "Revolution" | 2018 | The Beat Bugs: Complete Season 3 |
| Beat Bugs | "Hey Jude" | 2018 | The Beat Bugs: Complete Season 3 |
| Beat Bugs | "Baby, You're a Rich Man" | 2018 | The Beat Bugs: Complete Season 3 |
| Beat Bugs | "Paperback Writer" | 2018 | The Beat Bugs: Complete Season 3 |
| Beat Bugs | "I'm Only Sleeping" | 2018 | The Beat Bugs: Complete Season 3 |
| Beat Bugs | "A Day in the Life" | 2018 | The Beat Bugs: Complete Season 3 |
| Beat Bugs | "Mother Nature's Son" | 2018 | The Beat Bugs: Complete Season 3 |
| Beat Bugs | "Good Morning, Good Morning" | 2018 | The Beat Bugs: Complete Season 3 |
| Beat Bugs | "Ob-La-Di Ob-La-Da" | 2018 | The Beat Bugs: Complete Season 3 |
| Beat Bugs | "Oh! Darling" | 2018 | The Beat Bugs: Complete Season 3 |
| Beat Bugs | "The Long and Winding Road" | 2018 | The Beat Bugs: Complete Season 3 |
| Beck | "I've Got a Feeling" | 2005 | Beck: Animation Beck Soundtrack |
| Jeff Beck | "A Day in the Life" | 1998 | In My Life |
| Jeff Beck | "She's a Woman" | 1975 | Blow by Blow |
| Bee Gees | "A Day in the Life" | 1978 | Sgt. Pepper's Lonely Hearts Club Band 1978 film soundtrack |
| Bee Gees | "Being for the Benefit of Mr. Kite!" | 1978 | Sgt. Pepper's Lonely Hearts Club Band 1978 film soundtrack |
| Bee Gees | "Carry That Weight" | 1978 | Sgt. Pepper's Lonely Hearts Club Band 1978 film soundtrack |
| Bee Gees | "Getting Better" | 1978 | Sgt. Pepper's Lonely Hearts Club Band 1978 film soundtrack |
| Bee Gees | "Good Morning Good Morning" | 1978 | Sgt. Pepper's Lonely Hearts Club Band 1978 film soundtrack |
| Bee Gees | "Golden Slumbers" | 1978 | Sgt. Pepper's Lonely Hearts Club Band 1978 film soundtrack |
| Bee Gees | "I Want You (She's So Heavy)" | 1978 | Sgt. Pepper's Lonely Hearts Club Band 1978 film soundtrack |
| Bee Gees | "Nowhere Man" | 1978 | Sgt. Pepper's Lonely Hearts Club Band 1978 film soundtrack |
| Bee Gees | "Polythene Pam" | 1978 | Sgt. Pepper's Lonely Hearts Club Band 1978 film soundtrack |
| Bee Gees | "Sgt. Pepper's Lonely Hearts Club Band" | 1978 | Sgt. Pepper's Lonely Hearts Club Band 1978 film soundtrack |
| Bee Gees | "She Came In Through the Bathroom Window" | 1978 | Sgt. Pepper's Lonely Hearts Club Band 1978 film soundtrack |
| Bee Gees | "She's Leaving Home" | 1978 | Sgt. Pepper's Lonely Hearts Club Band 1978 film soundtrack |
| Bee Gees | "With a Little Help from My Friends" | 1978 | Sgt. Pepper's Lonely Hearts Club Band 1978 film soundtrack |
| Bee Gees | "Sun King" | 1976 | All This and World War II (Soundtrack) |
| Bee Gees | "Golden Slumbers/Carry That Weight" | 1976 | All This and World War II (Soundtrack) |
| Bee Gees | "She Came In Through the Bathroom Window" | 1976 | All This and World War II (Soundtrack) |
| Bee Gees | "Paperback Writer" | 1966 | Inception/Nostalgia |
| Bee Gees | "You Won't See Me" | 1966 | Inception/Nostalgia |
| Bee Gees | "Ticket to Ride" | 1966 | Inception/Nostalgia |
| Bee Gees | "I'll Be Back" | | |
| Bee Gees | "Please Please Me" | 1963 | Bandstand (TV program) |
| Béla Fleck and the Flecktones | "Oh! Darling" | 1991 | Flight of the Cosmic Hippo |
| Béla Fleck and the Flecktones | "Come Together" | 2007 | Live performances |
| Adrian Belew | "Blackbird" | 1993 | Come Together: Guitar Tribute To The Beatles |
| Adrian Belew | "Free as a Bird" | 1998 | Belew Prints: The Acoustic Adrian Belew, Vol. 2 |
| Adrian Belew | "If I Fell" | 1993 | The Acoustic Adrian Belew |
| Adrian Belew | "I'm Down" | 1983 | Twang Bar King |
| Ana Belen & Javier Gurruchaca | "Drive My Car" | 1990 | TVE Program El martes que viene |
| Drake Bell | "I've Got a Feeling" | | |
| Drake Bell | "I'm So Tired" | | |
| Drake Bell | "Blackbird" | | |
| Belle & Sebastian | "Here Comes the Sun" | | The BBC Sessions |
| John Belushi | "With a Little Help from My Friends" (Joe Cocker Version) | | Performed on Saturday Night Live as a parody on Joe Cocker's stage-movements. |
| Pat Benatar | "Helter Skelter" | 1981 | Precious Time |
| Carles Benavent, Tino di Geraldo and Jorge Pardo | "Michelle" | 2008 | Step Inside Love - a Jazzy Tribute to the Beatles |
| Cliff Bennett and the Rebel Rousers | "Got to Get You into My Life" | 1966 | Parlophone single |
| Cliff Bennett Band | "Back In the U.S.S.R." | 1968 | (Parlophone R5728) |
| Tony Bennett | "Something" | 1970 | Tony Sings the Great Hits of Today! |
| Tony Bennett | "Here, There and Everywhere" | 1970 | Tony Sings the Great Hits of Today! |
| Tony Bennett | "Eleanor Rigby" | 1970 | Tony Sings the Great Hits of Today! |
| Tony Bennett | "The Long and Winding Road" | 1970 | Tony Bennett's Something |
| David Benoit | "Here, There and Everywhere" | 1995 | (I Got No Kick Against) Modern Jazz |
| George Benson | "Golden Slumbers"/"You Never Give Me Your Money" | 1969 | The Other Side of Abbey Road |
| George Benson | "Because"/"Come Together" | 1969 | The Other Side of Abbey Road |
| George Benson | "Oh! Darling" | 1969 | The Other Side of Abbey Road |
| George Benson | "Here Comes the Sun"/"I Want You (She's So Heavy)" | 1969 | The Other Side of Abbey Road |
| George Benson | "Something"/"Octopus's Garden"/"The End" | 1969 | The Other Side of Abbey Road |
| George Benson | "Here, There and Everywhere" | 1989 | Tenderly |
| George Benson | "The Long and Winding Road" | 1995 | (I Got No Kick Against) Modern Jazz |
| Cathy Berberian | "Can't Buy Me Love" | 1967 | Beatles Arias, released in the US as "Revolution" |
| Cathy Berberian | "I Want to Hold Your Hand" | 1967 | Beatles Arias, released in the US as "Revolution" |
| Cathy Berberian | "A Hard Day's Night" | 1967 | Beatles Arias, released in the US as "Revolution" |
| Cathy Berberian | "Girl" | 1967 | Beatles Arias, released in the US as "Revolution" |
| Cathy Berberian | "Help!" | 1967 | Beatles Arias released in the US as "Revolution" |
| Cathy Berberian | "Eleanor Rigby" | 1967 | Beatles Arias released in the US as "Revolution" |
| Cathy Berberian | "You've Got to Hide Your Love Away" | 1967 | Beatles Arias, released in the US as "Revolution" |
| Cathy Berberian | "Here, There and Everywhere" | 1967 | Beatles Arias, released in the US as "Revolution" |
| Cathy Berberian | "Yellow Submarine" | 1967 | Beatles Arias, released in the US as "Revolution" |
| Cathy Berberian | "Michelle" | 1967 | Beatles Arias, released in the US as "Revolution" |
| Cathy Berberian | "Yesterday" | 1967 | Beatles Arias, released in the US as "Revolution" |
| Cathy Berberian | "Ticket to Ride" | 1967 | Beatles Arias, released in the US as "Revolution" |
| Matraca Berg | "Yesterday" | 2013 | Let Us In Americana: The Music of Paul McCartney |
| John Berry | "The Long and Winding Road" | 1995 | Come Together: America Salutes The Beatles |
| Betty | "Lucy in the Sky with Diamonds" | 1999 | Betty3 |
| Beyoncé, Brittney Spencer, Reyna Roberts, Tanner Adell and Tiera Kennedy | "Blackbiird" | 2024 | Cowboy Carter |
| Big Country | "Eleanor Rigby" | 1996 | Eclectic |
| Big Daddy | "Sgt. Pepper's Lonely Hearts Club Band" | 1992 | Sgt. Pepper's |
| Big Daddy | "With a Little Help from My Friends" | 1992 | Sgt. Pepper's |
| Big Daddy | "Lucy in the Sky with Diamonds" | 1992 | Sgt. Pepper's |
| Big Daddy | "Getting Better" | 1992 | Sgt. Pepper's |
| Big Daddy | "Fixing a Hole" | 1992 | Sgt. Pepper's |
| Big Daddy | "She's Leaving Home" | 1992 | Sgt. Pepper's |
| Big Daddy | "Being for the Benefit of Mr. Kite!" | 1992 | Sgt. Pepper's |
| Big Daddy | "Within You Without You" | 1992 | Sgt. Pepper's |
| Big Daddy | "When I'm Sixty-Four" | 1992 | Sgt. Pepper's |
| Big Daddy | "Lovely Rita" | 1992 | Sgt. Pepper's |
| Big Daddy | "Good Morning Good Morning" | 1992 | Sgt. Pepper's |
| Big Daddy | "Sgt. Pepper's Lonely Hearts Club Band (Reprise)" | 1992 | Sgt. Pepper's |
| Big Daddy | "A Day in the Life" | 1992 | Sgt. Pepper's |
| Big Time Rush | "I Want to Hold Your Hand" | 2012 | Big Time Movie Soundtrack |
| Big Time Rush | "We Can Work It Out" | 2012 | Big Time Movie Soundtrack |
| Big Time Rush | "A Hard Day's Night" | 2012 | Big Time Movie Soundtrack |
| Big Time Rush | "Can't Buy Me Love" | 2012 | Big Time Movie Soundtrack |
| Big Time Rush | "Help!" | 2012 | Big Time Movie Soundtrack |
| Big Time Rush | "Revolution" | 2012 | Big Time Movie Soundtrack |
| Bijele Strijele | "From Me to You" | 1964 | Voli me (Love Me Do) Recorded in Serbo-Croatian as "Zbog nje" |
| Bijele Strijele | "Please Please Me" | 1964 | Voli me (Love Me Do) Recorded in Serbo-Croatian as "Oprosti što sam opet tu" |
| Bijele Strijele | "Love Me Do" | 1964 | Voli me (Love Me Do) Recorded in Serbo-Croatian as "Voli me" |
| Bijele Strijele | "I Want to Hold Your Hand" | 1964 | Voli me (Love Me Do) Recorded in Serbo-Croatian as "Ljubav nas čeka" |
| Björk | "The Fool on the Hill" | 1977 | Björk Released as "'Álfur Út Úr Hól' |
| Mary Black | "Across the Universe" | 2003 | The Best of Mary Black, 1991–2001 |
| The Black Crowes | "Lucy in the Sky with Diamonds" | 2002 | I Am Sam soundtrack |
| The Black Crowes | "Do You Want to Know a Secret" | | (on a Christmas tape for the fanclub) |
| The Black Crowes | "Don't Let Me Down" | | (live only) |
| The Black Crowes | "Get Back" | | (live only) |
| The Black Crowes | "Happiness Is a Warm Gun" | | (live only) |
| The Black Crowes | "Tomorrow Never Knows" | | (live only) |
| The Black Crowes | "Yer Blues" | | (live only) |
| The Black Crowes | "You've Got to Hide Your Love Away" | | (live only) |
| The Black Keys | "She Said She Said" | 2002 | The Big Come Up |
| Black Oak Arkansas | "Taxman" | 1975 | Ain't Life Grand |
| Black Pumas | "Eleanor Rigby" | 2019 | Live Session |
| Black Sabbath | "Day Tripper" | 1970 | (Live) |
| Blackstreet | "Can't Buy Me Love" | 1996 | Another Level Recorded as "(Money Can't) Buy Me Love" |
| Rubén Blades | "Baby's in Black" | 1999 | Amor y Control |
| Blessid Union of Souls | "Revolution" | 1999 | Walking Off the Buzz (hidden track) |
| Blondie | "Please Please Me" | 2011 | Panic of Girls (bonus track – Japanese only) |
| Blood, Sweat & Tears | "Got to Get You into My Life" | 1975 | New City |
| Bloodrock | "Eleanor Rigby" | 1973 | Whirlwind Tongues |
| Blue Ash | "Any Time at All" | 1973 | No More, No Less |
| Blue Öyster Cult | "I Want You (She's So Heavy)" | 1980 | Recorded live in concert, included on The Complete Columbia Albums Collectiön and Rarities Vol. 2 |
| James Blunt | "Rocky Raccoon" | 2006 | |
| The Bobs | "Helter Skelter" | 1983 | The Bobs |
| Suzy Bogguss & Chet Atkins | "All My Loving" | 1995 | Come Together: America Salutes The Beatles |
| Michael Bolton | "Yesterday" | 1992 | Timeless: The Classics |
| Bon Jovi | "Help!" | 1993 | Playing in concerts of world tour |
| Bon Jovi | "Here Comes the Sun" | 2001 | Live at the VH1 Awards 2001 George Harrison Tribute |
| Bon Jovi | "With a Little Help from My Friends" | 1992 | Keep the Faith: An Evening with Bon Jovi |
| Bon Jovi | "Let It Be" | 2007 | Live in England with various British stars |
| Bon Jovi | "Helter Skelter" | 1995 | Live in Times Square from MTV Video Music Awards |
| Gary U.S. Bonds | "It's Only Love" | 1981 | Dedication |
| Graham Bonnet | "Oh! Darling" | 1999 | The Day I Went Mad |
| Bono | "I Am the Walrus" | 2007 | Across the Universe: Music from the Motion Picture |
| Bono | "Across the Universe" | 2005 | 47th Grammy Awards |
| Bono | "Lucy in the Sky with Diamonds" | 2007 | Across the Universe: Music from the Motion Picture |
| Boney M. | "Two of Us" | 1979 | Oceans Of Fantasy |
| Booker T. & the M.G.'s | "Eleanor Rigby" | 1968 | Soul Limbo |
| Booker T. & the M.G.'s | "Lady Madonna" | 1969 | The Booker T. Set |
| Booker T. & the M.G.'s | "Michelle" | 1969 | The Booker T. Set |
| Booker T. & the M.G.'s | Medley: "Golden Slumbers", "Carry That Weight", "The End", "Here Comes The Sun", "Come Together" | 1970 | McLemore Avenue |
| Booker T. & the M.G.'s | "Something" | 1970 | McLemore Avenue |
| Booker T. & the M.G.'s | "Day Tripper" | 1970 | McLemore Avenue |
| Booker T. & the M.G.'s | Medley: "Because", "You Never Give Me Your Money" | 1970 | McLemore Avenue |
| Booker T. & the M.G.'s | Medley: "Sun King", "Mean Mr. Mustard", "Polythene Pam", "She Came in Through the Bathroom Window", "I Want You (She's So Heavy)" | 1970 | McLemore Avenue |
| Booker T. & the M.G.'s | "You Can't Do That" | 2003 | Soul Men |
| James Booker | "Eleanor Rigby" | 1993 | Spiders On The Keys |
| James Booker | "Something" | 2000 | A Taste Of Honey : Live In New Orleans 1977 |
| James Booker | "Penny Lane" | 1997 | Live At Montreux : The James Booker Session |
| James Booker | "I Saw Her Standing There" | 1997 | Live At Montreux : The James Booker Session |
| Boris | "I Am the Walrus" | 2007 | Walrus / Groon |
| Alexei Borisov | "Revolution 9" | 2003 | Exotica Versus The Beatles |
| David Bowie | "Across the Universe" | 1975 | Young Americans |
| David Bowie | "Love Me Do" | | (from bootleg-album Pin-ups 5) |
| David Bowie | "This Boy" | | (from bootleg-album Pin-ups 5) |
| Boxer | "Hey Bulldog" | 1979 | Bloodletting |
| Boyz II Men | "Yesterday" | 1994 | II |
| Boyz II Men | "In My Life" | 2009 | Love |
| Paul Brady | "You Won't See Me" | 2006 | Rubber Folk |
| The Brady Bunch | "Love Me Do" | 1972 | The Kids from the Brady Bunch |
| Billy Bragg | "Revolution" | 1992 | Accident Waiting to Happen EP |
| Billy Bragg with Cara Tivey | "She's Leaving Home" | 1988 | Sgt. Pepper Knew My Father |
| Russell Brand | "When I'm Sixty-Four" | 2007 | Sgt. Pepper's Lonely Hearts Club Band – 40th Anniversary BBC Broadcast |
| Brass Construction | "We Can Work It Out" | 1983 | Conversations |
| Dan Ar Braz | "Rain" | 1979 | The Earth's Lament |
| Breakfast Club | "Drive My Car" | 1988 | Single |
| The Breeders | "Happiness Is a Warm Gun" | 1990 | Pod |
| Brian Bromberg | "Come Together" | 2009 | A New Abbey Road – A Tribute To The Beatles |
| Herman Brood | "Run for Your Life" | 1988 | Yada Yada |
| Gary Brooker | "Old Brown Shoe" | 2003 | Concert for George |
| The Brothers Four | "Revolution" | 1969 | Let's Get Together |
| The Brothers Four | "All My Loving" | 1966 | A Beatles Songbook |
| The Brothers Four | "And I Love Her" | 1966 | A Beatles Songbook |
| The Brothers Four | "Girl" | 1966 | A Beatles Songbook |
| The Brothers Four | "Help!" | 1966 | A Beatles Songbook |
| The Brothers Four | "I'll Follow the Sun" | 1966 | A Beatles Songbook |
| The Brothers Four | "If I Fell" | 1966 | A Beatles Songbook |
| The Brothers Four | "Michelle" | 1966 | A Beatles Songbook |
| The Brothers Four | "Norwegian Wood (This Bird Has Flown)" | 1966 | A Beatles Songbook |
| The Brothers Four | "Nowhere Man" | 1966 | A Beatles Songbook |
| The Brothers Four | "We Can Work It Out" | 1966 | A Beatles Songbook |
| The Brothers Four | "Yesterday" | 1966 | A Beatles Songbook |
| The Brothers Johnson | "Hey Jude" | 1976 | All This and World War II (Soundtrack) |
| The Brothers Johnson | "Come Together" | 1976 | Look Out for #1 |
| James Brown | "Something" | 1973 | B-side to Think |
| Joe Brown | "Here Comes the Sun" | 2003 | Concert for George |
| Joe Brown | "With a Little Help from My Friends" | 2001 | The Joe Brown Story : The Picadilly/Pye Anthology + 1967 Single (Pye) |
| Maxine Brown | "We Can Work It Out" | 1966 | Maxine Brown's Greatest Hits |
| Leo Brouwer | "The Fool on the Hill" | 1981 | De Bach a los Beatles |
| Leo Brouwer | "Penny Lane" | 1986 | Beatlerianas |
| Leo Brouwer | "Eleanor Rigby" | 1986 | Beatlerianas |
| Leo Brouwer | "Here, There and Everywhere" | 1986 | Beatlerianas |
| Leo Brouwer | "She's Leaving Home" | 1986 | Beatlerianas |
| Leo Brouwer | "Ticket to Ride" | 1986 | Beatlerianas |
| Leo Brouwer | "Yesterday" | 1986 | Beatlerianas |
| Leo Brouwer | "Got to Get You into My Life" | 1986 | Beatlerianas |
| Chico Buarque | "I Should Have Known Better" | 2012 | |
| Michael Bublé | "Can't Buy Me Love" | 2005 | It's Time |
| The Buckinghams | "I Call Your Name" | 1967 | Kind of a Drag |
| The Buckinghams | "I'll Be Back" | 1967 | Time & Charges |
| Jeff Buckley | "Come Together" | | |
| Los Bunkers | "Day Tripper" | | |
| Los Bunkers | "You Can't Do That" | | |
| Los Bunkers | "Here Comes The Sun" | | |
| Enrique Bunbury | "Come Together" | 1997 | Planeta sur single |
| Buranovskiye Babushki | "Let It Be" | | |
| Buranovskiye Babushki | "Yesterday" | | |
| Eric Burdon & War | "A Day in the Life" | 1976 | Love Is All Around |
| Jean-Jacques Burnel | "I Am the Walrus" | 2005 | Imagine No John Lennon |
| George Burns | "Being for the Benefit of Mr. Kite!" | 1978 | Sgt. Pepper's Lonely Hearts Club Band (film) |
| George Burns | "With a Little Help from My Friends" | 1969 | George Burns Sings (Buddah Recs. BDS-5025) |
| George Burns | "Fixing a Hole" | 1978 | Sgt. Pepper's Lonely Hearts Club Band (film) |
| Bush | "Come Together" | 2011 | |
| Sam Bush | "I've Just Seen a Face" | 2013 | Let Us In Americana: The Music of Paul McCartney |
| Butthole Surfers | "Come Together" | 1995 | The Hole Truth... and Nothing Butt |
| Max Bygraves | "When I'm Sixty-Four" | 1999 | I Wanna Sing You a Song |
| Max Bygraves | "A Hard Day's Night" | 1978 | Max-a-Million: Golden Greats Of The Sixties |
| Max Bygraves | "Yesterday" | 1978 | Max-a-Million: Golden Greats Of The Sixties |
| Glen Campbell | "Ticket to Ride" | 1965 | The Big Bad Rock Guitar of Glen Campbell |
| Junior Campbell | "Drive My Car" | 1972 | Second Time Around |
| Canadian Brass | "When I'm Sixty-Four" | 1998 | All You Need Is Love |
| Canadian Brass | "Michelle" | 1998 | All You Need Is Love |
| Canadian Brass | "I Am the Walrus" | 1998 | All You Need Is Love |
| Canadian Brass | "Penny Lane" | 1998 | All You Need Is Love |
| Canadian Brass | "Yesterday" | 1998 | All You Need Is Love |
| Canadian Brass | "Come Together" | 1998 | All You Need Is Love |
| Canadian Brass | "She's Leaving Home" | 1998 | All You Need Is Love |
| Canadian Brass | "With a Little Help from My Friends" | 1998 | All You Need Is Love |
| Canadian Brass | "Eleanor Rigby" | 1998 | All You Need Is Love |
| Canadian Brass | "You Never Give Me Your Money" | 1998 | All You Need Is Love |
| Canadian Brass | "I Want to Hold Your Hand" | 1998 | All You Need Is Love |
| Canadian Brass | "Blackbird" | 1998 | All You Need Is Love |
| Canadian Brass | "All You Need Is Love" | 1998 | All You Need Is Love |
| Candy Flip | "Strawberry Fields Forever" | 1990 | Madstock |
| Brandi Carlile | "All You Need Is Love" | 2010 | XOBC |
| Brandi Carlile | "I've Just Seen a Face" | | Live Performance |
| Roberto Carlos | "And I Love Her" (Yo La Amo) | 1995 | Hey Jude (Tributo A Los Beatles) |
| Wendy Carlos | "Eleanor Rigby" | 1975 | By Request |
| The Carpenters | "Ticket to Ride" | 1969 | Offering/Ticket to Ride |
| The Carpenters | "Help!" | 1970 | Close to You |
| The Carpenters | "Can't Buy Me Love" | | Your Navy Presents radio show |
| The Carpenters | "Nowhere Man" | 2001 | As Time Goes By |
| The Carpenters | "Good Night" | 1991 | From the Top |
| T. V. Carpio | "I Want to Hold Your Hand" | 2007 | Across the Universe: Music from the Motion Picture |
| T. V. Carpio | "Because" | 2007 | Across the Universe: Music from the Motion Picture |
| T. V. Carpio | "Dear Prudence" | 2007 | Across the Universe: Music from the Motion Picture |
| Vikki Carr | "Nowhere Man" | 1966 | Way of Today |
| Paul Carrack | "Girl" | 2007 | Old, New, Borrowed and Blue |
| Jim Carrey | "I Am the Walrus" | 1998 | In My Life |
| Jim Carrey | "Can't Buy Me Love" with Zooey Deschanel | 2008 | Yes Man film |
| Terri Lyne Carrington | "Michelle" | 2011 | The Mosaic Project |
| Waterson–Carthy | "Norwegian Wood (This Bird Has Flown)" | 2006 | Rubber Folk: A Folk Tribute To The Beatles |
| David Cassidy | "Please Please Me" | 1974 | Cassidy Live! |
| Eva Cassidy | "Yesterday" | 2003 | American Tune |
| Johnny Cash | "In My Life" | 2002 | American IV: The Man Comes Around |
| Rosanne Cash | "I Don't Want to Spoil the Party" | 1989 | Hits 1979–1989 |
| Rosanne Cash | "I'm Only Sleeping" | 1995 | Retrospective |
| Jason Castro | "Michelle" | 2008 | American Idol performance |
| Jason Castro | "If I Fell" | 2008 | American Idol performance |
| Nick Cave | "Let It Be" | 2002 | I Am Sam soundtrack |
| Nick Cave and the Bad Seeds | "Here Comes the Sun" | 2001 | I Am Sam (soundtrack) |
| Peter Cetera | "It's Only Love" | 2001 | Another Perfect World |
| Eugene Chadbourne | "A Day in the Life" | | |
| The Chameleons | "Tomorrow Never Knows" | 1986 | Strange Times |
| Chapterhouse | "Rain" | 2006 | Sunburst EP |
| Ray Charles | "The Long and Winding Road" | 1971 | Volcanic Action of My Soul (alternate mix on Ray Sings, Basie Swings) |
| Ray Charles | "Eleanor Rigby" | 1968 | A Portrait of Ray |
| Ray Charles | "Yesterday" | 1967 | Ray Charles Invites You to Listen |
| Ray Charles | "Let It Be" | 1977 | True to Life |
| Ray Charles | "Something" | 1971 | Volcanic Action of My Soul |
| Charles River Valley Boys | "I've Just Seen a Face" | 1966 | Beatle Country |
| Charles River Valley Boys | "Baby's in Black" | 1966 | Beatle Country |
| Charles River Valley Boys | "I Feel Fine" | 1966 | Beatle Country |
| Charles River Valley Boys | "Yellow Submarine" | 1966 | Beatle Country |
| Charles River Valley Boys | "Ticket to Ride" | 1966 | Beatle Country |
| Charles River Valley Boys | "And Your Bird Can Sing" | 1966 | Beatle Country |
| Charles River Valley Boys | "What Goes On" | 1966 | Beatle Country |
| Charles River Valley Boys | "Norwegian Wood (This Bird Has Flown)" | 1966 | Beatle Country |
| Charles River Valley Boys | "Paperback Writer" | 1966 | Beatle Country |
| Charles River Valley Boys | "She's a Woman" | 1966 | Beatle Country |
| Charles River Valley Boys | "I Saw Her Standing There" | 1966 | Beatle Country |
| Charles River Valley Boys | "Help!" | 1966 | Beatle Country |
| Chayanne | "Michelle" | 1995 | Hey Jude (Tributo A Los Beatles) |
| Chayanne, Ricky Martin, La Mafia, Yuri, Magneto, Ilan Chester, Lourdes Robles and Willy Chirino | "Hey Jude" | 1995 | Hey Jude (Tributo A Los Beatles) |
| Cheap Trick | "Magical Mystery Tour" | 1991 | The Greatest Hits |
| Cheap Trick | "Day Tripper" | 1980 | Found All the Parts |
| Cheap Trick | "Sgt. Pepper's Lonely Hearts Club Band" | 2009 | Sgt. Pepper Live |
| Cheap Trick | "With a Little Help from My Friends" | 2009 | Sgt. Pepper Live |
| Cheap Trick | "Lucy in the Sky with Diamonds" | 2009 | Sgt. Pepper Live |
| Cheap Trick | "Getting Better" | 2009 | Sgt. Pepper Live |
| Cheap Trick | "Fixing a Hole" | 2009 | Sgt. Pepper Live |
| Cheap Trick | "She's Leaving Home" | 2009 | Sgt. Pepper Live |
| Cheap Trick | "Being for the Benefit of Mr. Kite!" | 2009 | Sgt. Pepper Live |
| Cheap Trick | "Within You Without You" | 2009 | Sgt. Pepper Live |
| Cheap Trick | "When I'm Sixty-Four" | 2009 | Sgt. Pepper Live |
| Cheap Trick | "Lovely Rita" | 2009 | Sgt. Pepper Live |
| Cheap Trick | "Good Morning Good Morning" | 2009 | Sgt. Pepper Live |
| Cheap Trick | "Sgt. Pepper's Lonely Hearts Club Band (Reprise)" | 2009 | Sgt. Pepper Live |
| Cheap Trick | "A Day in the Life" | 2009 | Sgt. Pepper Live |
| Cheap Trick | "Abbey Road Medley" | 2009 | Sgt. Pepper Live |
| Cher | "Day Tripper" | | |
| Cher | "The Long and Winding Road" | 1973 | Half-Breed |
| Cher | "Beatles Medley" | | |
| Ilan Chester | "Here, There and Everywhere" (Aqui, Alla, Y En Todas Partes) | 1995 | Hey Jude (Tributo A Los Beatles) |
| Chicago | "Got To Get You into My Life" | 1982 | CHICAGO Live In Dortmund, Germany 18 December 1982 DVD |
| Chikezie | "She's a Woman" | 2008 | American Idol performance |
| Chikezie | "I've Just Seen a Face" | 2008 | American Idol performance |
| Alex Chilton | "I Want to Hold Your Hand" | 1992 | Downtown Does The Beatles Live At The Knitting Factory |
| Willy Chirino | "Eleanor Rigby | 1995 | Hey Jude (Tributo A Los Beatles) |
| Chocolate Genius | "Julia" | 2002 | I Am Sam soundtrack |
| The Christians | "Lucy in the Sky with Diamonds" | 1988 | Sgt. Pepper Knew My Father |
| Jennifer Cihi | "I Want to Hold Your Hand" | 1999 | Sailor Moon & The Scouts - Lunarock soundtrack |
| Eric Clapton | "Something" | 2003 | Concert for George |
| Eric Clapton | "If I Needed Someone" | 2003 | Concert for George |
| Eric Clapton | "While My Guitar Gently Weeps" with Paul McCartney | 2003 | Concert for George |
| Gary Clark Jr. and Junkie XL | "Come Together" | 2017 | Justice League soundtrack |
| Petula Clark | "I Want to Hold Your Hand" | 1965 | The International Hits |
| Petula Clark | "We Can Work It Out" | 1966 | My Love |
| Petula Clark | "Rain" | 1966 | I Couldn't Live Without Your Love |
| Petula Clark | "Here, There and Everywhere" | 1967 | Colour My World |
| Petula Clark | "Hey Jude" | 1969 | Just Pet |
| Petula Clark | "The Fool On the Hill" | 1969 | Just Pet |
| Cloud Cult | "Help!" | 2011 | Minnesota Beatles Project, Vol. 3 |
| Kurt Cobain | "And I Love Her" | 2015 | Montage of Heck: The Home Recordings |
| Riccardo Cocciante | "Michelle" | 1976 | All This and World War II (Soundtrack) |
| Bruce Cockburn | "The Fool on the Hill" | 2013 | Let Us In Americana: The Music of Paul McCartney |
| Joe Cocker | "I'll Cry Instead" | 1964 | single (with Jimmy Page on backup guitar) |
| Joe Cocker | "With a Little Help from My Friends" | 1968 | With a Little Help from My Friends |
| Joe Cocker | "She Came in Through the Bathroom Window" | 1969 | Joe Cocker! |
| Joe Cocker | "Something" | 1969 | Joe Cocker! |
| Joe Cocker | "Let It Be" | 1969 | Joe Cocker! (Bonus Track) |
| Joe Cocker | "You've Got to Hide Your Love Away" | 1991 | Night Calls |
| Joe Cocker | "Come Together" | 2007 | Across the Universe: Music from the Motion Picture |
| Alma Cogan | "Ticket to Ride" | 1966 | Alma |
| Alma Cogan | "Eight Days a Week" | 1966 | Alma |
| Alma Cogan | "Yesterday" | 1966 | Alma |
| Alma Cogan | "I Feel Fine" | 1966 | Alma |
| CoH | "Strawberry Fields Forever" | 2003 | Exotica Versus The Beatles Dakota Strawberry Mix |
| Avishai Cohen | "Come Together" | 2003 | Lyla |
| The Cold | "Love Me Do" | 1982 | Cold Sweat |
| Coldplay | "Here Comes the Sun" | | Live performance |
| Holly Cole | "I've Just Seen a Face" | 1997 | Dark Dear Heart |
| Chris Colfer | "I Want to Hold Your Hand" | 2010 | Glee ("Grilled Cheesus") |
| Chris Colfer | "Blackbird" | 2011 | Glee ("Original Song") |
| Chris Colfer & Lea Michele | "Get Back" | 2013 | Glee ("Tina in the Sky with Diamonds") |
| Juan Diego Flores | "I Saw Her Standing There" | 2016 | Spanish TV Program |
| Judy Collins | "In My Life" | 1966 | In My Life |
| Judy Collins | "And I Love Her" | 2007 | Judy Collins Sings Lennon and McCartney |
| Judy Collins | "Blackbird" | 2007 | Judy Collins Sings Lennon and McCartney |
| Judy Collins | "Golden Slumbers" | 2007 | Judy Collins Sings Lennon and McCartney |
| Judy Collins | "Penny Lane" | 2007 | Judy Collins Sings Lennon and McCartney |
| Judy Collins | "Norwegian Wood" | 2007 | Judy Collins Sings Lennon and McCartney |
| Judy Collins | "When I'm Sixty-Four" | 2007 | Judy Collins Sings Lennon and McCartney |
| Judy Collins | "Good Day Sunshine" | 2007 | Judy Collins Sings Lennon and McCartney |
| Judy Collins | "Hey Jude" | 2007 | Judy Collins Sings Lennon and McCartney |
| Judy Collins | "We Can Work It Out" | 2007 | Judy Collins Sings Lennon and McCartney |
| Judy Collins | "Yesterday" | 2007 | Judy Collins Sings Lennon and McCartney |
| Judy Collins | "I'll Follow the Sun" | 2007 | Judy Collins Sings Lennon and McCartney |
| Judy Collins | "Long & Winding Road" | 2007 | Judy Collins Sings Lennon and McCartney |
| Judy Collins | "Let It Be" | 2008 | 24 Classic Songs |
| Phil Collins | "Tomorrow Never Knows" | 1981 | Face Value |
| Phil Collins | "Golden Slumbers"/"Carry That Weight"/"The End" | 1998 | In My Life |
| Shawn Colvin | "I'll Be Back" | 2004 | Polaroids: A Greatest Hits Collection |
| Perry Como | "Yesterday" | 1966 | Lightly Latin |
| Perry Como | "Something" | 1970 | It's Impossible |
| Perry Como | "Michelle" | 1977 | The Best of British |
| Perry Como | "Here, There and Everywhere" | 1975 | Just Out of Reach |
| Les Compagnons de la chanson | "Yellow Submarine" ("Le sous-marin vert" – sang in French translation) | 1966 | single |
| Arthur Conley | "Ob-La-Di, Ob-La-Da" | 1969 | More Sweet Soul |
| Sean Connery | "In My Life" | 1998 | In My Life |
| Harry Connick Jr. | "And I Love Her" | 2009 | Your Songs |
| Billy Connolly | "Being for the Benefit of Mr. Kite!" | 1998 | In My Life |
| David Cook | "Eleanor Rigby" | 2008 | American Idol performance |
| David Cook | "Day Tripper" | 2008 | American Idol performance |
| Kristy Lee Cook | "Eight Days a Week" | 2008 | American Idol performance |
| Kristy Lee Cook | "You've Got to Hide Your Love Away" | 2008 | American Idol performance |
| Coope Boyes and Simpson | "Think for Yourself" | 2005 | Rubber Folk |
| Alice Cooper | "Because" | 1978 | Sgt. Pepper's Lonely Hearts Club Band (film) |
| Alice Cooper | "Eleanor Rigby" | 2014 | The Art of McCartney |
| Alice Cooper | "Hey Bulldog" | 2006 | Butchering the Beatles: A Headbashing Tribute |
| Copy | "Tomorrow Never Knows" | 2003 | Exotica Versus The Beatles |
| James Corden | "I'm a Loser" | 2016 | The Beat Bugs: Complete Season 1 |
| Chick Corea | "Eleanor Rigby" | 1995 | (I Got No Kick Against) Modern Jazz |
| Chick Corea with Hiromi Uehara | "The Fool on the Hill" | 2009 | Duet |
| Chris Cornell | "You've Got to Hide Your Love Away" | 2007 | Live performances |
| Cornershop | "Norwegian Wood (This Bird Has Flown)" | 1997 | When I Was Born For The 7th Time |
| Coroner | "I Want You (She's So Heavy)" | 1991 | Mental Vortex |
| Andrea Corr | "Blackbird" | | |
| The Corrs | "The Long and Winding Road" | 2001 | "Would You Be Happier" single |
| Larry Coryell | "Something" | 2014 | The Beatles: A Jazz Tribute, Celebrating 50 Years |
| Bill Cosby | "Sgt. Pepper's Lonely Hearts Club Band" | 1968 | Bill Cosby Sings Hooray for the Salvation Army Band! |
| Roxy Coss | "Oh! Darling" | 2017 | Chasing the Unicorn |
| Elvis Costello | "You've Got to Hide Your Love Away" | 2004 | Kojak Variety bonus disc |
| Elvis Costello | "Let it Be" | | |
| Elvis Costello | "All You Need Is Love" | 1985 | Performed at Live Aid |
| Elvis Costello | "Penny Lane" | 2010 | Performed at the White House for Paul McCartney and President Barack Obama |
| Elvis Costello | "Hey Bulldog" | | Live performances |
| Josie Cotton | "The Night Before" | 1986 | Everything Is Oh Yeah |
| Jonathan Coulton | "I Will" | 2006 | Thing-a-Week Two |
| Counting Crows | "She's Leaving Home" | | |
| Cowboy Junkies | "Run for Your Life" | 2005 | This Bird Has Flown – A 40th Anniversary Tribute to the Beatles' Rubber Soul |
| Crash Kings | "Hey Bulldog" | 2010 | YouTube upload through their official channel |
| The Crickets | "I Want to Hold Your Hand" | 1964 | California Sun – She Loves You |
| Cristina | "Drive My Car" | 1980 | single |
| Crooked Still | "We Can Work It Out" | 2011 | Friends of Fall |
| Bing Crosby | "Hey Jude" | 1968 | Hey Jude/Hey Bing! |
| Crosby, Stills & Nash | "Blackbird" | 1969 | Woodstock |
| Crosby, Stills & Nash | "In My Life" | 1994 | After the Storm |
| Crosby, Stills & Nash | "In My Life" | 1998 | A Tribute to Nicolette Larson: Lotta Love Concert |
| Sheryl Crow | "Mother Nature's Son" | 2002 | I Am Sam soundtrack |
| Sheryl Crow | "Here Comes the Sun" | 2007 | Bee Movie soundtrack |
| Crowded House | "Rocky Raccoon" | 1996 | "Instinct" single b-side (as introduction to "Chocolate Cake") |
| Celia Cruz | "Ob-La-Di, Ob-La-Da" | 1996 | Tropical Tribute to The Beatles |
| The Cryan' Shames | "If I Needed Someone" | 1967 | Sugar and Spice |
| Dejan Cukić | "Strawberry Fields Forever" | 2002 | Kalendar |
| Jamie Cullum | "Sgt. Pepper's Lonely Hearts Club Band" | 2007 | Sgt. Pepper's Lonely Hearts Club Band – 40th Anniversary BBC Broadcast |
| Jamie Cullum | "Come Together" | 2011 | BBC Radio 2 2DAY |
| The Cure | "Hello Goodbye" | 2014 | The Art of McCartney |
| Roger Daltrey | "Helter Skelter" | 2014 | The Art of McCartney |
| The Damned | "Help!" | 1976 | B-side to "New Rose" single |
| Danger Mouse | | | See The Grey Album |
| Bobby Darin | "Beatles Medley" (Hey Jude/Something/A Day in the Life/Eleanor Rigby/Blackbird/Hey Jude) | 1987 | Live at the Desert Inn |
| Dave Matthews Band | "Blackbird" | 2005 | Live Performance |
| Dave Matthews Band | "Good Morning Good Morning" | | Live Performance |
| Dave Matthews Band | "I Saw Her Standing There" | | Live Performance |
| Dave Matthews Band | "In My Life" | | Live Performance |
| Dave Matthews Band | "Hey Bulldog" | | Live Performance |
| Dave Matthews Band | "Her Majesty" | | Live Performance |
| Dave Matthews Band | "Norwegian Wood (This Bird Has Flown)" | | Live Performance |
| Dave Matthews Band | "You Won't See Me" | | Live Performance |
| Craig David | "Come Together" | 2001 | Come Together: A Night for John Lennon's Words and Music |
| David and Jonathan | "Michelle" | 1966 | single |
| David and Jonathan | "She's Leaving Home" | 1967 | single |
| David and Jonathan | "Yesterday" | 1966 | David and Jonathan |
| Davina and the Vagabonds | "Honey Pie" | 2008 | Live @ The Times |
| Miles Davis | "Strawberry Fields Forever" | 1990 | live performance |
| Sammy Davis Jr. | "A Hard Day's Night" | 1965 | |
| Sammy Davis Jr. | "Something" | 1979 | Hearin' Is Believin' (live album) |
| Sammy Davis Jr. | "With a Little Help from My Friends" | 1979 | Hearin' Is Believin |
| Sammy Davis Jr. | "A Day in the Life" | 1979 | Hearin' Is Believin |
| Sammy Davis Jr. | "She's Leaving Home" | 1979 | Hearin' Is Believin |
| Sammy Davis Jr. | "Yesterday" | 1979 | Hearin' Is Believin |
| Danielle Dax | "Tomorrow Never Knows" | 1990 | Blast the Human Flower |
| Howie Day | "Help!" | 2002 | I Am Sam soundtrack |
| dc Talk | "Help!" | 1997 | Welcome to the Freak Show |
| Chris de Burgh | "Girl" | 1995 | Beautiful Dreams |
| Lynsey de Paul | "Because" | 1976 | All This and World War II (Soundtrack) |
| Dead Kennedys | "Back In the U.S.S.R." | 2004 | Live at the Deaf Club |
| Billy Dean | "Yesterday" | 1995 | Come Together: America Salutes The Beatles |
| Deep Purple | "Help!" | 1968 | Shades of Deep Purple |
| Deep Purple | "We Can Work It Out" | 1968 | The Book of Taliesyn |
| Def Leppard | "Come Together" | 2006 | Hysteria Deluxe Edition |
| Defunkt | "Come Together" | 1992 | Downtown Does the Beatles Live at the Knitting Factory |
| John Denver | "Here, There and Everywhere" | 1966 | John Denver Sings |
| John Denver | "Yesterday" | 1966 | John Denver Sings |
| John Denver | "And I Love Her" | 1966 | John Denver Sings |
| John Denver | "In My Life" | 1966 | John Denver Sings |
| John Denver | "When I'm Sixty-Four" | 1969 | Rhymes & Reasons |
| John Denver | "Hey Jude" | 1969 | The Wise Owl Concert |
| John Denver | "Lady Madonna" | 1969 | The Wise Owl Concert |
| John Denver | "Eleanor Rigby" | 1970 | Whose Garden Was This |
| John Denver | "Golden Slumbers" | 1970 | Whose Garden Was This |
| John Denver | "Let It Be" | 1971 | Poems, Prayers & Promises |
| John Denver | "Mother Nature's Son" | 1972 | Rocky Mountain High |
| John Denver | "Blackbird" | 1973 | The BBC Shows Live |
| Joe DeRenzo | "She's a Woman" | 2008 | Step Inside Love - a Jazzy Tribute to the Beatles |
| The Detroit Emeralds | "And I Love Her" | 1970 | Do Me Right |
| Lee DeWyze | "Hey Jude" | 2010 | American Idol performance |
| Neil Diamond | "Golden Slumbers" / "Carry That Weight" | 1988 | Greatest Hits DVD |
| Neil Diamond | "And I Love Her" | 1998 | The Movie Album: As Time Goes By |
| Neil Diamond | "Something" | 2014 | Melody Road (bonus track on Target Deluxe Edition only) |
| Neil Diamond | "Blackbird" | 2010 | Dreams |
| Neil Diamond | "Yesterday" | 2010 | Dreams |
| Vince DiCola | "Something" | 1993 | Artistically Beatles |
| Vince DiCola | "Eleanor Rigby" | 1993 | Artistically Beatles |
| Vince DiCola | "You Never Give Me Your Money" | 1993 | Artistically Beatles |
| Vince DiCola | "Here Comes the Sun" | 1993 | Artistically Beatles |
| Vince DiCola | "Norwegian Wood (This Bird Has Flown)" | 1993 | Artistically Beatles |
| Vince DiCola | "Penny Lane" | 1993 | Artistically Beatles |
| Vince DiCola | "Maxwell's Silver Hammer" | 1993 | Artistically Beatles |
| Vince DiCola | "Michelle" | 1993 | Artistically Beatles |
| Vince DiCola | "Because" | 1993 | Artistically Beatles |
| Vince DiCola | "Here, There and Everywhere" | 1993 | Artistically Beatles |
| Dillard & Clark | "Don't Let Me Down" | 1969 | Through the Morning, Through the Night |
| The Dillards | "I've Just Seen a Face" | 1968 | Wheatstraw Suite |
| The Dillards | "Yesterday" | 1970 | Copperfields |
| Cara Dillon & Sam Lakeman | "Wait" | 2006 | Rubber Folk |
| Phyllis Dillon | "Something" | 2001 | Mellow Dubmarine |
| Pat DiNizio | "For No One" | 2006 | This is Pat DiNizio |
| Dion | "Drive My Car" | 2014 | The Art of McCartney |
| Céline Dion | "Here, There and Everywhere" | 1998 | In My Life |
| Céline Dion | "Because" | | |
| Céline Dion | "Something" | | |
| Divididos | "With A Little Help From My Friends" | 2010 | Amapola 66 |
| Divididos | "I Want You (She's So Heavy)" | 2009 | (Live at Quilmes Rock) |
| Oscar D'Leon | "Lady Madonna" | 1996 | Tropical Tribute to the Beatles |
| Pete Doherty | "She Loves You" | | |
| Pete Doherty | "Ticket to Ride" | 2008 | |
| Dokken | "Nowhere Man" | 1996 | One Live Night |
| Dollar | "I Want to Hold Your Hand" | 1982 | The Very Best of Dollar |
| Plácido Domingo | "Yesterday" | 1982 | single |
| Fats Domino | "Lady Madonna" | | Fats is Back (also charted at #100) |
| Tanya Donelly | "Long, Long, Long" | 2006 | This Hungry Life |
| The Donnas | "Drive My Car" | 2005 | This Bird Has Flown – A 40th Anniversary Tribute to the Beatles' Rubber Soul |
| Val Doonican | "All My Loving" | 1969 | Gentle On My Mind |
| Val Doonican | "Yesterday" | 1968 | Val Doonican Rocks, But Gently |
| Dr. Sin | "Doctor Robert" | 2005 | Listen to the Doctors |
| Dr. Sin | "Everybody's Got Something to Hide Except Me and My Monkey" | 2008 | Album Branco – White Album 40 years |
| Dream Theater | "Happiness Is a Warm Gun" | | |
| Dream Theater | "Abbey Road Medley" | 1993 | Images and Words: Live in Tokyo |
| Dream Theater | "Strawberry Fields Forever" | | |
| Chris Duarte | "I'm So Tired" | 2006 | The Blues White Album |
| Bob Dylan | "Yesterday" | | Yesterday 69–70 boot |
| Bob Dylan | "Something" | | Live performances |
| Bob Dylan | "Nowhere Man" | | |
| Bob Dylan | "Here Comes the Sun" | | |
| Bob Dylan | "Things We Said Today" | 2014 | The Art of McCartney |
| Steve Earle | "I'm Looking Through You" | 1995 | Train a Comin' |
| Steve Earle and Allison Moorer | "I Will" | 2013 | Let Us In Americana: The Music of Paul McCartney |
| Earth, Wind & Fire | "Got to Get You into My Life" | 1978 | Sgt. Pepper's Lonely Hearts Club Band soundtrack |
| Easy Star All-Stars ft. Junior Jazz | "Sgt. Pepper's Lonely Hearts Club Band" | 2009 | Easy Star's Lonely Hearts Dub Band |
| Easy Star All-Stars ft. Luciano | "With a Little Help from My Friends" | 2009 | Easy Star's Lonely Hearts Dub Band |
| Easy Star All-Stars ft. Frankie Paul | "Lucy in the Sky with Diamonds" | 2009 | Easy Star's Lonely Hearts Dub Band |
| Easy Star All-Stars ft. The Mighty Diamonds | "Getting Better" | 2009 | Easy Star's Lonely Hearts Dub Band |
| Easy Star All-Stars ft. Max Romeo | "Fixing a Hole" | 2009 | Easy Star's Lonely Hearts Dub Band |
| Easy Star All-Stars ft. Kirsty Rock | "She's Leaving Home" | 2009 | Easy Star's Lonely Hearts Dub Band |
| Easy Star All-Stars ft. Ranking Roger | "Being for the Benefit of Mr. Kite!" | 2009 | Easy Star's Lonely Hearts Dub Band |
| Easy Star All-Stars ft. Matisyahu | "Within You Without You" | 2009 | Easy Star's Lonely Hearts Dub Band |
| Easy Star All-Stars ft. Sugar Minott | "When I'm Sixty-Four" | 2009 | Easy Star's Lonely Hearts Dub Band |
| Easy Star All-Stars ft. Bunny Rugs & U-Roy | "Lovely Rita" | 2009 | Easy Star's Lonely Hearts Dub Band |
| Easy Star All-Stars ft. Steel Pulse | "Good Morning Good Morning" | 2009 | Easy Star's Lonely Hearts Dub Band |
| Easy Star All-Stars | "Sgt. Pepper's Lonely Hearts Club Band (Reprise)" | 2009 | Easy Star's Lonely Hearts Dub Band |
| Easy Star All-Stars ft. Michael Rose and Menny More | "A Day in the Life" | 2009 | Easy Star's Lonely Hearts Dub Band |
| Echo & the Bunnymen | "Ticket to Ride" | 2001 | "Make Me Shine" single |
| Echo & the Bunnymen | "All You Need Is Love" | 1985 | "Seven Seas" single / deluxe version of Ocean Rain |
| Eels | "I'm a Loser" | 2005 | Sixteen Tons (Ten Songs) |
| Billie Eilish | "Something" | 2020 | |
| Billie Eilish | "Yesterday" | 2020 | 92nd Academy Awards |
| Arik Einstein | "The Ballad of John and Yoko" (We Had Good Times, We Had Bad Times.) | 1969 | Poozy |
| Arik Einstein | "Ob-La-Di, Ob-La-Da" | 1968 | single |
| əkoostik hookah | "I Am the Walrus" | | |
| Elbow | "Golden Slumbers" | 2017 | The Best Of (Deluxe) |
| Electric Light Orchestra | "Day Tripper" | 1974 | The Night the Light Went On in Long Beach |
| Električni Orgazam | "I've Got a Feeling" | 1981 | Električni orgazam |
| Električni Orgazam | "Being for the Benefit of Mr. Kite!" | 1983 | Les Chansones Populaires |
| Cássia Eller | "Sgt. Pepper's Lonely Hearts Club Band" | 2001 | Acústico MTV: Cássia Eller |
| Andy Ellison | "You Can't Do That" | 2006 | Cornflake Zoo |
| Andy Ellison | "Help!" | 2006 | Discography |
| Elmo | "Drive My Car" | 1996 | Sing-Along Travel Songs |
| Tommy Emmanuel | "Lady Madonna" | 1987 | Up from Down Under |
| Tommy Emmanuel | "Michelle" | 1987 | Up from Down Under |
| Tommy Emmanuel | "Day Tripper/Lady Madonna" | 1993 | The Journey Continues |
| En Vogue | "Yesterday" | 1992 | Funky Divas |
| Enuff Z'Nuff | "Revolution" | 2021 | Hardrock Nite |
| David Essex | "Yesterday" | 1976 | All This and World War II (Soundtrack) |
| Ethel the Frog | "Eleanor Rigby" | 1978 | single |
| Eurythmics | "Come Together" | 1987 | Bonus track on Savage rerelease |
| Eva Braun | "Misery" | 1993 | Unplugged 16 April 1993 |
| The Everly Brothers | "The End" | 1970 | The Everly Brothers Show |
| Connie Evingson | "Wait" | 2008 | Step Inside Love - a Jazzy Tribute to the Beatles |
| Extreme | "Help!" | 1992 | B-side to single "Tragic Comic" |
| Los Fabulosos Cadillacs (featuring Deborah Harry) | "Strawberry Fields Forever" | 1995 | Rey Azucar |
| Fairground Attraction | "Do You Want to Know a Secret" | 1989 | " Clare " single |
| Andy Fairweather-Low | "Rocky Raccoon" | 1976 | Be Bop 'n' Holla |
| Marianne Faithfull | "I'm a Loser" | 1965 | LP Marianne Faithfull |
| Marianne Faithfull | "Yesterday" | 1965 | single |
| Falco | "Revolution" | | |
| Jason Falkner | "Blackbird" | 2001 | Bedtime With the Beatles (Blue Cover) |
| Jason Falkner | "Across The Universe" | 2001 | Bedtime With the Beatles (Blue Cover) |
| Jason Falkner | "And I Love Her" | 2001 | Bedtime With the Beatles (Blue Cover) |
| Jason Falkner | "I'm Only Sleeping" | 2001 | Bedtime With the Beatles (Blue Cover) |
| Jason Falkner | "The Long and Winding Road" | 2001 | Bedtime With the Beatles (Blue Cover) |
| Jason Falkner | "If I Fell" | 2001 | Bedtime With the Beatles (Blue Cover) |
| Jason Falkner | "The Fool On The Hill" | 2001 | Bedtime With the Beatles (Blue Cover) |
| Jason Falkner | "Mother Nature's Son" | 2001 | Bedtime With the Beatles (Blue Cover) |
| Jason Falkner | "Michelle" | 2001 | Bedtime With the Beatles (Blue Cover) |
| Jason Falkner | "Here, There and Everywhere" | 2001 | Bedtime With the Beatles (Blue Cover) |
| Jason Falkner | "In My Life" | 2001 | Bedtime With the Beatles (Blue Cover) |
| The Fall | "A Day In The Life" | 1988 | Sgt. Pepper Knew My Father |
| Georgie Fame | "You Can't Do That" | | |
| Fanny | "Hey Bulldog" | 1972 | Fanny Hill |
| Farhad | "Yesterday" | | |
| Farhad | "Let it Be" | | |
| Sandy Farina | "Here Comes the Sun" | 1978 | Sgt. Pepper's Lonely Hearts Club Band soundtrack |
| Sandy Farina | "Strawberry Fields Forever" | 1978 | Sgt. Pepper's Lonely Hearts Club Band soundtrack |
| John Farnham | "Help!" | 1980 | Uncovered |
| John Farnham | "And I Love Her" | 1997 | Anthology 2: Classic Hits 1967-1985 (Recorded Live) |
| John Farnham | "I Feel Fine" | 1997 | Anthology 3: Rarities |
| John Farnham | "Birthday" | 1997 | Anthology 3: Rarities |
| Perry Farrell | "Got to Get You into My Life" | 2014 | The Art of McCartney |
| Dionne Farris | "Blackbird" | 1994 | Wild Seed – Wild Flower |
| Father | "Eleanor Rigby" | 2009 | single, released on One Eon in 2010 |
| The Feelies | "Everybody's Got Something to Hide Except Me and My Monkey" | 1980 | Crazy Rhythms |
| The Feelies | "She Said She Said" | 1986 | The Good Earth (Bonus track on 2009 re-release) |
| Wilton Felder | "With a Little Help from My Friends" | 1969 | Bullitt |
| Cheo Feliciano | "Yesterday" | 1996 | Tropical Tribute to the Beatles |
| José Feliciano | "In My Life" | 1968 | Feliciano! |
| José Feliciano | "And I Love Her" | 1968 | Feliciano! |
| José Feliciano | "Here, There and Everywhere" | 1968 | Feliciano! |
| José Feliciano | "A Day in the Life" | 1969 | Alive Alive O! |
| José Feliciano | "Blackbird" | 1970 | Fireworks |
| José Feliciano | "Day Tripper" | 1969 | Alive Alive O! |
| José Feliciano | "Eleanor Rigby" | 2001 | The Genius |
| José Feliciano | "Help!" | 1966 | A Bag Full Of Soul |
| José Feliciano | "Hey Jude" | 1969 | Feliciano 10 to 23 |
| José Feliciano | "I Feel Fine" | 1983 | Romance in the Night |
| José Feliciano | "I Saw Her Standing There" | 1988 | Live in Germany 1988 |
| José Feliciano | "I Want to Hold Your Hand" | 2001 | The Genius |
| José Feliciano | "Lady Madonna" | 1969 | 'Feliciano 10 to 23 |
| José Feliciano | "Let It Be" | 1970 | Fireworks |
| José Feliciano | "Norwegian Wood (This Bird Has Flown)" | 1970 | Fireworks |
| José Feliciano | "She Came In Through the Bathroom Window" | 1970 | Fireworks |
| José Feliciano | "She's a Woman" | 1969 | Feliciano 10 to 23 |
| José Feliciano | "Things We Said Today" | 1964 | Live at Ash Grove |
| José Feliciano | "Yesterday" | 1970 | Fireworks |
| Jay Ferguson | "I'm Down" | 1982 | White Noise |
| Maynard Ferguson | "Hey Jude" | 1972 | M.F. Horn Two |
| Ferron | "I Feel Fine" | 1999 | Inside Out: The IMA Sessions |
| Bryan Ferry | "You Won't See Me" | 1973 | These Foolish Things |
| Bryan Ferry | "It's Only Love" | 1976 | Let's Stick Together |
| Bryan Ferry | "She's Leaving Home" | 1976 | All This and World War II (Soundtrack) |
| Ferry Aid | "Let It Be" | 1987 | single |
| Arthur Fiedler & the Boston Pops | "I Want to Hold Your Hand" | 1964 | Arthur Fiedler & the Boston Pops Play the Beatles |
| Arthur Fiedler & the Boston Pops | "Eleanor Rigby" | 1969 | Arthur Fiedler & the Boston Pops Play the Beatles |
| Arthur Fiedler & the Boston Pops | "And I Love Her" | 1969 | Arthur Fiedler & the Boston Pops Play the Beatles |
| Arthur Fiedler & the Boston Pops | "Ob-La-Di, Ob-La-Da" | 1969 | Arthur Fiedler & the Boston Pops Play the Beatles |
| Arthur Fiedler & the Boston Pops | "Hey Jude" | 1969 | Arthur Fiedler & the Boston Pops Play the Beatles |
| Arthur Fiedler & the Boston Pops | "With a Little Help from My Friends" | 1969 | Arthur Fiedler & the Boston Pops Play the Beatles |
| Arthur Fiedler & the Boston Pops | "Yellow Submarine" | 1969 | Arthur Fiedler & the Boston Pops Play the Beatles |
| Arthur Fiedler & the Boston Pops | "Penny Lane" | 1969 | Arthur Fiedler & the Boston Pops Play the Beatles |
| Arthur Fiedler & the Boston Pops | "A Hard Day's Night" | 1965 | Arthur Fiedler & the Boston Pops Play the Beatles |
| Arthur Fiedler & the Boston Pops | "The Fool on the Hill" | 1969 | Arthur Fiedler & the Boston Pops Play the Beatles |
| Arthur Fiedler & the Boston Pops | "Yesterday" | 1968 | Arthur Fiedler & the Boston Pops Play the Beatles |
| Arthur Fiedler & the Boston Pops | "Michelle" | 1968 | Arthur Fiedler & the Boston Pops Play the Beatles |
| The Fiery Furnaces | "Norwegian Wood (This Bird Has Flown)" | 2005 | This Bird Has Flown – A 40th Anniversary Tribute to the Beatles' Rubber Soul |
| Neil Finn & Liam Finn | "Two of Us" | 2002 | " I Am Sam " soundtrack |
| Firewater | "Hey Bulldog" | 2004 | Songs We Should Have Written |
| Ella Fitzgerald | "Can't Buy Me Love" | 1964 | Hello, Dolly! |
| Ella Fitzgerald | "A Hard Day's Night" | 1965 | Ella in Hamburg |
| Ella Fitzgerald | "Hey Jude" | 1969 | Sunshine of Your Love |
| Ella Fitzgerald | "Got to Get You into My Life" | 1969 | Ella |
| Ella Fitzgerald | "Savoy Truffle" | 1969 | Ella |
| Ella Fitzgerald | "Something" | 1971 | Ella à Nice |
| The Five Stairsteps | "Dear Prudence" | 1970 | |
| Roberta Flack | "In My Life" | 2012 | Let It Be Roberta: Roberta Flack Sings The Beatles |
| The Flamin' Groovies | "Misery" | 1976 | Shake Some Action |
| The Flamin' Groovies | "There's a Place" | 1989 | Groovies' Greatest Grooves |
| The Flamin' Groovies | "Please Please Me" | 1979 | Jumpin' In The Night |
| The Flaming Lips with My Morning Jacket, Fever the Ghost and J Mascis | "Sgt. Pepper's Lonely Hearts Club" | 2014 | With a Little Help from My Fwends |
| The Flaming Lips with Black Pus and The Autumn Defense | "With a Little Help from My Friends" | 2014 | With a Little Help from My Fwends |
| The Flaming Lips with Miley Cyrus and Moby | "Lucy in the Sky with Diamonds" | 2014 | With a Little Help from My Fwends |
| The Flaming Lips with Dr. Dog, Chuck Inglish and Morgan Delt | "Getting Better" | 2014 | With a Little Help from My Fwends |
| The Flaming Lips with Electric Würms | "Fixing a Hole" | 2014 | With a Little Help from My Fwends |
| The Flaming Lips with Phantogram, Julianna Barwick and Spaceface | "She's Leaving Home" | 2014 | With a Little Help from My Fwends |
| The Flaming Lips with Maynard James Keenan, Puscifer and Sunbears! | "Being for the Benefit or Mr. Kite!" | 2014 | With a Little Help from My Fwends |
| The Flaming Lips with Birdflower and Morgan Delt | "Within You Without You" | 2014 | With a Little Help from My Fwends |
| The Flaming Lips with Def Rain and Pitchwafuzz | "When I'm Sixty-Four" | 2014 | With a Little Help from My Fwends |
| The Flaming Lips with Tegan and Sara and Stardeath and White Dwarfs | "Lovely Rita" | 2014 | With a Little Help from My Fwends |
| The Flaming Lips with Zorch, Grace Potter and Treasure Mammal | "Good Morning Good Morning" | 2014 | With a Little Help from My Fwends |
| The Flaming Lips with Foxygen and Ben Goldwasser | "Sgt. Pepper's Lonely Hearts Club Band (Reprise)" | 2014 | With a Little Help from My Fwends |
| The Flaming Lips with Miley Cyrus and New Fumes | "A Day in the Life" | 2014 | With a Little Help from My Fwends |
| Florence + the Machine | "Oh! Darling" | 2009 | Lungs Special box edition |
| The Flowers | "I Don't Want to Spoil the Party" | 2001 | |
| Ben Folds | "Golden Slumbers" | 2002 | I Am Sam soundtrack |
| Foo Fighters | "Blackbird" | | |
| Fool's Garden | "Cry Baby Cry" | 1991 | Fool's Garden |
| Tennessee Ernie Ford | "Let It Be" | 1970 | Everything Is Beautiful |
| Mitchel Forman | "Here, There and Everywhere" | 2008 | Step Inside Love - a Jazzy Tribute to the Beatles |
| The Format | "Across the Universe" | | |
| David Foster with Katharine McPhee | "Something" | 2008 | American Idol Season 7 |
| The Four Seasons | "We Can Work It Out" | 1976 | All This and World War II (Soundtrack) |
| Four Tops | "The Long and Winding Road" | 1970 | Changing Times |
| Four Tops | "The Fool on the Hill" | 1969 | Four Tops Now! |
| The Fourmost | "Here, There and Everywhere" | 1966 | single |
| Samantha Fox | "I Should Have Known Better" | 2010 | The Beatles Complete On Ukulele |
| Les Fradkin | "All You Need is Love" | 2005 | Pepper Front to Back |
| Les Fradkin | "Free as a Bird" | 2005 | Guitar Revolution |
| Les Fradkin | "Here Comes the Sun" | 2005 | While My Guitar Only Plays |
| Les Fradkin | "If I Needed Someone" | 2005 | While My Guitar Only Plays |
| Les Fradkin | "While My Guitar Gently Weeps" | 2005 | While My Guitar Only Plays |
| Joel Frahm & Brad Mehldau | "Mother Nature's Son" | 2008 | Step Inside Love: A Jazzy Tribute to the Beatles |
| Nikolai Fraiture | "In My Life" | | |
| Roddy Frame | "In My Life" | 2002 | Uncut Presents: Instant Karma 2002; a Tribute to John Lennon |
| Peter Frampton | "The Long and Winding Road" | 2002 | The Beatles Tribute – Come Together |
| Peter Frampton | "While My Guitar Gently Weeps" | 2003 | Now |
| Peter Frampton | "Abbey Road medley" | | |
| Frances | "In My Life" | 2016 | The Beat Bugs: Complete Season 1 |
| Aretha Franklin | "Eleanor Rigby" | 1969 | single |
| Aretha Franklin | "Let It Be" | 1970 | This Girl's in Love with You |
| Aretha Franklin | "The Fool on the Hill" | 2007 | Rare & Unreleased Recordings from the Golden Reign of the Queen of Soul ("This Girl's In Love With You" Outtake) |
| Aretha Franklin | "The Long and Winding Road" | 1972 | Young, Gifted and Black |
| Aretha Franklin | "Lady Madonna" | | " Grace Under Fire " Theme song 1993–96 |
| Franz Ferdinand | "It Won't Be Long" | | |
| The Fray | "Fixing a Hole" | 2007 | Sgt. Pepper's Lonely Hearts Club Band – 40th Anniversary BBC Broadcast |
| The Free Design | "Michelle" | 1967 | Kites Are Fun |
| Russ Freeman | "While My Guitar Gently Weeps" | 1995 | (I Got No Kick Against) Modern Jazz |
| Paul Frees | "Hey Jude" | 1970 | Paul Frees and the Poster People |
| John Frusciante | "Helter Skelter" | | |
| Cody Fry | "Eleanor Rigby" | | |
| Dana Fuchs | "Dear Prudence" | 2007 | Across the Universe: Music from the Motion Picture |
| Dana Fuchs | "Why Don't We Do It in the Road?" | 2007 | Across the Universe: Music from the Motion Picture |
| Dana Fuchs | "I Want You (She's So Heavy)" | 2007 | Across the Universe: Music from the Motion Picture |
| Dana Fuchs | "Oh! Darling" | 2007 | Across the Universe: Music from the Motion Picture |
| Dana Fuchs | "Helter Skelter" | 2007 | Across the Universe: Music from the Motion Picture |
| Dana Fuchs | "Don't Let Me Down" | 2007 | Across the Universe: Music from the Motion Picture |
| Bobby Fuller | "Any Time at All" | 1966 | Never To Be Forgotten - The Mustang Years |
| Lowell Fulson | "Why Don't We Do It in the Road?" | 1970 | A Heavy Bag |
| Ana Gabriel | "Something" (Algo) | 1995 | Hey Jude (Tributo A Los Beatles) |
| Peter Gabriel | "Strawberry Fields Forever" | 1976 | All This and World War II (Soundtrack) |
| Eric Gales Band | "I Want You (She's So Heavy)" | 2009 | A New Abbey Road – A Tribute To The Beatles |
| Noel Gallagher | "All You Need Is Love" | 2009 | The Dreams We Have as Children (Live for Teenage Cancer Trust) |
| Noel Gallagher | "Strawberry Fields Forever" | 2006 | our music 3 |
| James Galway | "Golden Slumbers" | 1994 | Wind of Change |
| James Galway | "Here, There and Everywhere" | 1994 | Wind of Change |
| Garbage | "Don't Let Me Down" | | |
| Charly García | "Rain" | 2004 | (Live at Quilmes Rock) |
| Charly García, Pedro Aznar & Gustavo Cerati | "Dear Prudence" | 2001 | (Say no More Bar) |
| Charly García | "I Saw Her Standing There" | 1994 | (Live acoustic in FM 100) |
| Charly García | "Within You Without You" | | (Argentinean TV: Remembering George Harrison) |
| Jerry Garcia | "I Saw Her Standing There" | 1982 | Run for the Roses |
| Jerry Garcia | "Dear Prudence" | 2004 | All Good Things box set |
| Jerry Garcia Band | "Eleanor Rigby Jam" | 2004 | After Midnight: Kean College, 2/28/80 |
| Jerry Garcia Band | "Dear Prudence" | 2004 | After Midnight: Kean College, 2/28/80 bonus disc |
| Art Garfunkel | "I Will" | 1996 | Across America |
| Marvin Gaye | "Yesterday" | 1969 | That's the Way Love Is |
| Gene | "Don't Let Me Down" | 1995 | Still Can't Find The Phone ( Single ) |
| Bobbie Gentry | "The Fool on the Hill" | 1968 | Local Gentry |
| Bobbie Gentry | "Eleanor Rigby" | 1968 | Local Gentry |
| Bobbie Gentry | "Here, There and Everywhere" | 1968 | Local Gentry |
| Ghost | "Here Comes the Sun" | 2011 | Opus Eponymous |
| Barry Gibb | "When I'm Sixty-Four" | 2014 | The Art of McCartney |
| Barry Gibb | "A Day in The Life" | 2002 | The Beatles Tribute – Come Together |
| Robin Gibb | "Oh! Darling" | 1978 | Sgt. Pepper's Lonely Hearts Club Band soundtrack |
| Gina X | "Drive My Car" | 1984 | Yinglish |
| Seru Giran | "Day Tripper" | 1988 | |
| Seru Giran | "Get Back" | 1988 | |
| Seru Giran | "Getting Better" | 1988 | |
| Seru Giran | "This Boy" | 1988 | |
| Glay | "Mother Nature's Son" | 2007 | "Ashes " single |
| Glee Cast | "In My Life" | 2012 | Glee ("Goodbye") |
| Candice Glover | "Come Together" | 2013 | American Idol performance |
| Godhead | "Eleanor Rigby" | 1998 | Power Tool Stigmata |
| The Gods | "Hey Bulldog" | 1969 | Single a-side |
| Godsmack | "Come Together" | 2012 | Live & Inspired |
| Golden Earring | "I'll Be Back" | 1995 | Love Sweat |
| Gil Goldstein | "In My Life" | 1989 | Blue Beat: Blue Note Plays the Music of Lennon and McCartney |
| Gotthard | "Come Together" | 1993 | Dial Hard |
| Gov't Mule | "She Said She Said" | 1998 | Dose |
| Grandaddy | "Revolution" | 2002 | I Am Sam soundtrack |
| Peter Grant | "I Saw Her Standing There" | 2006 | New Vintage |
| The Grass Roots | "You've Got to Hide Your Love Away" | 1966 | Where Were You When I Needed You |
| Grateful Dead | "Blackbird" | | |
| Grateful Dead | "Day Tripper" | | |
| Grateful Dead | "Hey Jude" | 1997 | Live At The Filmore East 2-11-69 |
| Grateful Dead | "I Want to Tell You" | | |
| Grateful Dead | "Rain" | | |
| Grateful Dead | "Tomorrow Never Knows" | 2003 | Dick's Pick's Vol.27 (12-16-92 Oakland) |
| Grateful Dead | "Lucy in the Sky with Diamonds" | | |
| Grateful Dead | "Get Back" | | |
| Grateful Dead | "Revolution" | 1997 | Terrapin Station ( Limited Edition ) Capital Centre, Landover, MD 3-15-90 Disc 3 |
| Grateful Dead | "Why Don't We Do It in the Road?" | | |
| Grateful Dead | "I Want to Tell You" | | |
| Al Green | "Get Back" | 1969 | Green is Blues |
| Al Green | "I Want to Hold Your Hand" | 2003 | Green is Blues 40th Anniversary Edition |
| Grant Green | "A Day in the Life" | 1970 | Green Is Beautiful |
| Grant Green | "I Want to Hold Your Hand" | 1965 | Blue Beat: Blue Note Plays the Music of Lennon and McCartney |
| Green Day | "Hey Jude" | | (2009/2010 World Tour) |
| Joel Grey | "Ob-La-Di, Ob-La-Da" | 1969 | Black Sheep Boy |
| Joel Grey | "She's Leaving Home" | 1969 | Black Sheep Boy |
| Joel Grey | "In My Life" | 1967 | Only the Beginning |
| Marcia Griffiths | "Don't Let Me Down" | | |
| Paul Griggs | "You Won't See Me" | 1983 | Single |
| Dave Grohl | "Blackbird" | 2016 | Performed at The 2016 Oscars ( In Memoriam Tribute ) |
| Groove Collective | "I Want You (She's So Heavy)" | 1996 | (I Got No Kick Against) Modern Jazz |
| Henry Gross | "Help!" | 1976 | All This and World War II (Soundtrack) |
| Dave Grusin | "Yesterday" | 1995 | (I Got No Kick Against) Modern Jazz |
| Gryphon | "Mother Nature's Son" | 1975 | Raindance |
| Kajsa Grytt | "Revolution" | 1994 | Revolution |
| Vince Guaraldi | "I'm a Loser" | 1966 | Live at El Matador |
| Vince Guaraldi | "Eleanor Rigby" | 1967 | Vince Guaraldi with the San Francisco Boys Chorus |
| Vince Guaraldi | "Yesterday" | 1969 | The Eclectic Vince Guaraldi |
| Vince Guaraldi | "Eleanor Rigby" | 1970 | Alma-Ville |
| Vince Guaraldi | "Something" | 2004 | Oaxaca |
| Vince Guaraldi | "You Never Give Me Your Money" | 2004 | Oaxaca |
| Vince Guaraldi | "Eleanor Rigby" | 2008 | Live on the Air |
| Vince Guaraldi | "Eleanor Rigby" | 2011 | An Afternoon with the Vince Guaraldi Quartet |
| The Guess Who | "Blackbird" | 2006 | Let's Go |
| The Guess Who | "Hey Jude" | 2006 | Let's Go |
| Guianko | "Can't Buy Me Love" | 1996 | Tropical Tribute to the Beatles |
| Gunship | "Eleanor Rigby" | 2020 | Eleanor Rigby |
| Guns N' Roses | "Back In the U.S.S.R." | | |
| Guns N' Roses | "Happiness Is a Warm Gun" | | |
| Guns N' Roses | "Let It Be" | | |
| Guns N' Roses | "Lucy in the Sky with Diamonds" | | |
| Guster | "Two of Us" | 2007 | Satellite |
| Guys 'n' Dolls | "She's Leaving Home" | 1975 | Guys "N ' Dolls |
| Gyllene Tider | "And Your Bird Can Sing" as "Och jorden den är rund" (And the Earth Is Round) | 1981 | Bonus EP included with Moderna Tider |
| Sammy Hagar | "Birthday" | 2014 | The Art of McCartney |
| Halestorm | "I Want You (She's So Heavy)" | 2011 | Reanimate: The Covers EP |
| Bill Haley & His Comets | "I Saw Her Standing There" | 1965 | German NCO club tour; unofficial recording exists |
| Johnny Hallyday | "I Saw Her Standing There" as "Quand je l'ai vue devant moi" | 1964 | Les guitares jouent |
| Mari Hamada | "Helter Skelter" | 1985 | Blue Revolution |
| Herbie Hancock | "Norwegian Wood (This Bird Has Flown)" | 1996 | The New Standard |
| Herbie Hancock | "Tomorrow Never Knows" | 2010 | The Imagine Project |
| Herbie Hancock | "Blackbird" | 2010 | Live with Corinne Bailey Rae at the Gershwin Prize Ceremony at the White House |
| Hanson | "Oh! Darling" | 2008 | (Live performance) |
| Steve Harley & Cockney Rebel | "Here Comes the Sun" | 1976 | single |
| Ben Harper | "Strawberry Fields Forever" | 2002 | I Am Sam soundtrack |
| Ben Harper | "Michelle" | 2005 | This Bird Has Flown – A 40th Anniversary Tribute to the Beatles' Rubber Soul |
| Gene Harris | "Eleanor Rigby" | 1971 | The 3 Sounds |
| Gene Harris | "Something" | 1973 | Yesterday, Today & Tomorrow |
| Emmylou Harris | "Here, There and Everywhere" | 1975 | Elite Hotel |
| Emmylou Harris | "For No One" | 1975 | Pieces of the Sky |
| Noel Harrison | "Strawberry Fields Forever" | 1967 | Collage |
| Noel Harrison | "When I'm Sixty-Four" | 1967 | Collage |
| Noel Harrison | "Lucy In The Sky With Diamonds" | 1967 | Collage |
| Harry J All Stars | "Don't Let Me Down" | 1969 | Liquidator |
| Gordon Haskell | "Things We Said Today " | 1996 | Butterfly In China |
| Gordon Haskell | "Eleanor Rigby " | 2000 | The Scheme of Things |
| Gordon Haskell | "Lady Madonna" | 2008 | Gordon Haskell w Szczecinie Live! |
| Donny Hathaway | "Yesterday" | 2004 | These Songs For You... Live! |
| Richie Havens | "Eleanor Rigby" | 1967 | Mixed Bag |
| Richie Havens | "Rocky Raccoon" | 1967 | single (VS 1521) |
| Richie Havens | "Strawberry Fields Forever" | 1969 | Richard P. Havens, 1983 |
| Richie Havens | "Lady Madonna" | 1969 | Richard P. Havens, 1983 |
| Richie Havens | "She's Leaving Home" | 1969 | Richard P. Havens, 1983 |
| Richie Havens | "With a Little Help from My Friends" | 1969 | Richard P. Havens, 1983 (live) |
| Richie Havens | "Here Comes the Sun" | 1971 | Alarm Clock |
| Richie Havens | "In My Life" | 1987 | Sings Beatles and Dylan |
| Richie Havens | "The Long and Winding Road" | 1987 | Sings Beatles and Dylan |
| Richie Havens | "Let It Be" | 1987 | Sings Beatles and Dylan |
| Greg Hawkes | "Penny Lane" | 2008 | The Beatles Uke |
| Greg Hawkes | "And I Love Her" | 2008 | The Beatles Uke |
| Greg Hawkes | "Strawberry Fields Forever" | 2008 | The Beatles Uke |
| Greg Hawkes | "Here Comes the Sun" | 2008 | The Beatles Uke |
| Greg Hawkes | "Eleanor Rigby" | 2008 | The Beatles Uke |
| Greg Hawkes | "Being for the Benefit of Mr. Kite!" | 2008 | The Beatles Uke |
| Greg Hawkes | "The Fool on the Hill" | 2008 | The Beatles Uke |
| Greg Hawkes | "Yellow Submarine" | 2008 | The Beatles Uke |
| Greg Hawkes | "Piggies" | 2008 | The Beatles Uke |
| Greg Hawkes | "She's Leaving Home" | 2008 | The Beatles Uke |
| Greg Hawkes | "Honey Pie" | 2008 | The Beatles Uke |
| Greg Hawkes | "For You Blue" | 2008 | The Beatles Uke |
| Greg Hawkes | "Yesterday" | 2008 | The Beatles Uke |
| Greg Hawkes | "Blue Jay Way" | 2008 | The Beatles Uke |
| Greg Hawkes | "Good Night" | 2008 | The Beatles Uke |
| Goldie Hawn | "A Hard Day's Night" | 1998 | In My Life |
| Salma Hayek | "Happiness Is a Warm Gun" | 2007 | Across the Universe: Music from the Motion Picture |
| Isaac Hayes | "Something" | 1970 | The Isaac Hayes Movement |
| Eddie Hazel | "I Want You (She's So Heavy)" | 1977 | Game, Dames and Guitar Thangs |
| Jeff Healey | "While My Guitar Gently Weeps" | 1990 | Hell to Pay |
| Jeff Healey | "Yer Blues" | 1995 | Cover to Cover |
| Heart | "I'm Down" (medley with "Long Tall Sally") | 1980 | Greatest Hits Live |
| Dianne Heatherington | "Helter Skelter" | 1980 | Heatherington Rocks |
| The Helio Sequence | "Tomorrow Never Knows" | 2000 | Com Plex |
| Helloween | "Something" | 1999 | "Lay All Your Love on Me" (single) |
| Helloween | "All My Loving" | 1999 | Metal Jukebox |
| Jimi Hendrix | "Sgt. Pepper's Lonely Hearts Club Band" | 1967 | Stages |
| Jimi Hendrix | "Tomorrow Never Knows" (with Jim Morrison) | 1994 | Bleeding Heart |
| Jimi Hendrix | "Day Tripper" | 1998 | BBC Sessions |
| Don Henley | "Yes It Is" | 1986 | The Bridge School Concerts, Vol. 1 |
| The Heptones | "Ob-La-Di, Ob-La-Da" | 1969 | B side of the single "Sweet Talking" |
| David Hernandez | "I Saw Her Standing There" | 2008 | American Idol performance |
| Vincent Herring | "Norwegian Wood" | 2014 | The Beatles: A Jazz Tribute, Celebrating 50 Years |
| Kristin Hersh | "Everybody's Got Something to Hide Except Me and My Monkey" | 1999 | "Echo" single |
| Boo Hewerdine & Eddi Reader | "What Goes On" | 2006 | Rubber Folk |
| Colleen Hewett | "Carry That Weight" | 1972 | Colleen Hewett |
| Taylor Hicks | "A Day in the Life" | 2007 | American Idol performance |
| Taylor Hicks | "Don't Let Me Down" | | (Live performance) |
| Taylor Hicks | "Something" | 2006 | American Idol finale |
| Steve Hillage | "It's All Too Much" | 1976 | L |
| The Hobos | "Rain" | 2004 | Radio Jah Jah |
| The Hobos | "I've Just Seen a Face" | 2004 | Radio Jah Jah |
| Allan Holdsworth | "Michelle" | 1993 | "Come Together : Guitar Tribute To The Beatles " |
| Xaviera Hollander | "Michelle" | 1973 | Xaviera! |
| The Hollies | "If I Needed Someone" | 1965 | (UK single A-Side, Parlophone RS5392) |
| The Hollyridge Strings | "A Day in the Life" | 1968 | The Beatles Song Book Vol. 5 |
| The Hollyridge Strings | "A Hard Day's Night" | 1965 | The Beatles Song Book Vol. 2 |
| The Hollyridge Strings | "All My Loving" | 1964 | The Beatles Song Book Vol. 1 |
| The Hollyridge Strings | "All You Need Is Love" | 1968 | The Beatles Song Book Vol. 5 |
| The Hollyridge Strings | "And I Love Her" | 1966 | The New Beatles Song Book |
| The Hollyridge Strings | "Baby, You're a Rich Man" | 1968 | The Beatles Song Book Vol. 5 |
| The Hollyridge Strings | "Can't Buy Me Love" | 1964 | The Beatles Song Book Vol. 1 |
| The Hollyridge Strings | "Day Tripper" | 1966 | The New Beatles Song Book |
| The Hollyridge Strings | "Do You Want to Know a Secret" | 1964 | The Beatles Song Book Vol. 1 |
| The Hollyridge Strings | "Drive My Car" | 1967 | The Beatles Song Book Vol. 4 |
| The Hollyridge Strings | "Eight Days a Week" | 1967 | The Beatles Song Book Vol. 4 |
| The Hollyridge Strings | "Eleanor Rigby" | 1967 | The Beatles Song Book Vol. 4 |
| The Hollyridge Strings | "From Me to You" | 1964 | The Beatles Song Book Vol. 1 |
| The Hollyridge Strings | "Girl" | 1966 | The New Beatles Song Book |
| The Hollyridge Strings | "Good Day Sunshine" | 1967 | The Beatles Song Book Vol. 4 |
| The Hollyridge Strings | "Hello, Goodbye" | 1968 | The Beatles Song Book Vol. 5 |
| The Hollyridge Strings | "Help!" | 1966 | The New Beatles Song Book |
| The Hollyridge Strings | "I Am the Walrus" | 1968 | The Beatles Song Book Vol. 5 |
| The Hollyridge Strings | "I Feel Fine" | 1965 | The Beatles Song Book Vol. 2 |
| The Hollyridge Strings | "If I Fell" | 1965 | The Beatles Song Book Vol. 2 |
| The Hollyridge Strings | "I'll Be Back" | 1965 | The Beatles Song Book Vol. 2 |
| The Hollyridge Strings | "I'll Cry Instead" | 1965 | The Beatles Song Book Vol. 2 |
| The Hollyridge Strings | "I'll Follow the Sun" | 1965 | The Beatles Song Book Vol. 2 |
| The Hollyridge Strings | "I'm a Loser" | 1965 | The Beatles Song Book Vol. 2 |
| The Hollyridge Strings | "I'm Happy Just to Dance with You" | 1965 | The Beatles Song Book Vol. 2 |
| The Hollyridge Strings | "I Saw Her Standing There" | 1964 | The Beatles Song Book Vol. 1 |
| The Hollyridge Strings | "I've Just Seen a Face" | 1967 | The Beatles Song Book Vol. 4 |
| The Hollyridge Strings | "I Want to Hold Your Hand" | 1964 | The Beatles Song Book Vol. 1 |
| The Hollyridge Strings | "Love Me Do" | 1964 | The Beatles Song Book Vol. 1 |
| The Hollyridge Strings | "Magical Mystery Tour" | 1968 | The Beatles Song Book Vol. 5 |
| The Hollyridge Strings | "Michelle" | 1966 | The New Beatles Song Book |
| The Hollyridge Strings | "No Reply" | 1965 | The Beatles Song Book Vol. 2 |
| The Hollyridge Strings | "Norwegian Wood (This Bird Has Flown)" | 1966 | The New Beatles Song Book |
| The Hollyridge Strings | "Nowhere Man" | 1966 | The New Beatles Song Book |
| The Hollyridge Strings | "Penny Lane" | 1967 | The Beatles Song Book Vol. 4 |
| The Hollyridge Strings | "Please Please Me" | 1964 | The Beatles Song Book Vol. 1 |
| The Hollyridge Strings | "P.S. I Love You" | 1964 | The Beatles Song Book Vol. 1 |
| The Hollyridge Strings | "Sgt. Pepper's Lonely Hearts Club Band" | 1968 | The Beatles Song Book Vol. 5 |
| The Hollyridge Strings | "She Loves You" | 1964 | The Beatles Song Book Vol. 1 |
| The Hollyridge Strings | "She's a Woman" | 1965 | The Beatles Song Book Vol. 2 |
| The Hollyridge Strings | "She's Leaving Home" | 1968 | The Beatles Song Book Vol. 5 |
| The Hollyridge Strings | "Strawberry Fields Forever" | 1967 | The Beatles Song Book Vol. 4 |
| The Hollyridge Strings | "Taxman" | 1967 | The Beatles Song Book Vol. 4 |
| The Hollyridge Strings | "The Fool on the Hill" | 1968 | The Beatles Song Book Vol. 5 |
| The Hollyridge Strings | "The Night Before" | 1966 | The New Beatles Song Book |
| The Hollyridge Strings | "Things We Said Today" | 1965 | The Beatles Song Book Vol. 2 |
| The Hollyridge Strings | "Ticket to Ride" | 1966 | The New Beatles Song Book |
| The Hollyridge Strings | "We Can Work It Out" | 1966 | The New Beatles Song Book |
| The Hollyridge Strings | "When I'm Sixty-Four" | 1968 | The Beatles Song Book Vol. 5 |
| The Hollyridge Strings | "Yellow Submarine" | 1967 | The Beatles Song Book Vol. 4 |
| The Hollyridge Strings | "Yesterday" | 1966 | The New Beatles Song Book |
| The Hollyridge Strings | "Your Mother Should Know" | 1968 | The Beatles Song Book Vol. 5 |
| The Hollyridge Strings | "You've Got to Hide Your Love Away" | 1967 | The Beatles Song Book Vol. 4 |
| Homy Hogs | "Why Don't We Do It in the Road?" | 1981 | Nöje För Nekrofiler |
| Hoodoo Gurus | "A Hard Day's Night" | 1998 | Electric Chair |
| The Hooters | "Lucy in the Sky with Diamonds" | 1996 | Hooterization: A Retrospective |
| Paul Horn | "Girl" | 1966 | Monday, Monday |
| Paul Horn | "Norwegian Wood (This Bird Has Flown)" | 1966 | Monday, Monday |
| Lena Horne and Gábor Szabó | "Something" | 1969 | Lena & Gabor |
| The Hour Glass | "Norwegian Wood (This Bird Has Flown)" | 1968 | Power of Love |
| House of Heroes | "Can't Buy Me Love" | 2009 | House Of Heroes Meets The Beatles (EP) |
| House of Heroes | "It Won't Be Long" | 2009 | House Of Heroes Meets The Beatles (EP) |
| House of Heroes | "Ob-La-Di, Ob-La-Da" | 2009 | House Of Heroes Meets The Beatles (EP) |
| Frankie Howerd | "Mean Mr. Mustard" | 1978 | Sgt. Pepper's Lonely Hearts Club Band ( Soundtrack ) |
| Frankie Howerd | "When I'm Sixty-Four" | 2002 | The Beatles Tribute – Come Together |
| Jennifer Hudson | "Let It Be" | 2010 | Hope For Haiti Now |
| Jennifer Hudson | "Golden Slumbers"/"Carry That Weight" | 2016 | Sing: Original Motion Picture Soundtrack |
| Hue and Cry | "Fixing a Hole" | 1988 | Sgt. Pepper Knew My Father |
| Humble Pie | "We Can Work It Out" | 1975 | Street Rats |
| Humble Pie | "Rain" | 1975 | Street Rats |
| Humble Pie | "Drive My Car" | 1975 | Street Rats |
| Engelbert Humperdinck | "Penny Lane" | 2003 | Definition of Love |
| Hush Sound | "Back In the U.S.S.R." | | |
| Hüsker Dü | "Helter Skelter" | | |
| Hüsker Dü | "Ticket to Ride" | 1986 | NME's Big Four |
| Hyde | "Lucy in the Sky with Diamonds" | 2003 | Horizon |
| Chrissie Hynde | "Let It Be" | 2014 | The Art of McCartney |
| I Against I | "I Want to Hold Your Hand" | 1997 | " Top Of The World" single |
| Ibex & Freddie Mercury | "Rain" | 2000 | Rarities 3 ( Freddie Mercury Box Set ) |
| The Ides of March | "Symphony for Eleanor (Eleanor Rigby)" | 1970 | Vehicle |
| Julio Iglesias | "And I Love Her" | 1990 | Starry Night |
| The Impressions | "The Fool on the Hill" | 1969 | The Versatile Impressions |
| The Impressions | "Yesterday" | 1969 | The Versatile Impressions |
| Indexi | "A Hard Day's Night" | | |
| Indexi | "Nowhere Man" | | |
| James Ingram | "Yesterday" | 2015 | Songs Of The Cover Hits Of The Beatles |
| The Inmates | "Little Child" | 1987 | Meet The Beatles |
| The Inmates | "I'll Get You" | 1987 | Meet The Beatles |
| The Inmates | "She's a Woman" | 1987 | Meet The Beatles |
| The Inmates | "You Can't Do That" | 1987 | Meet The Beatles |
| The Inmates | "Day Tripper" | 1987 | Meet The Beatles |
| The Inmates | "Back In the U.S.S.R." | 1987 | Meet The Beatles |
| The Inmates | "We Can Work It Out" | 1987 | Meet The Beatles |
| The Inmates | "Sgt. Pepper's Lonely Hearts Club Band" | 1987 | Meet The Beatles |
| The Inmates | "Birthday" | 1987 | Meet The Beatles |
| The Inmates | "I Saw Her Standing There" | 1987 | Meet The Beatles |
| The Inmates | "Get Back" | 1987 | Meet The Beatles |
| The Inmates | "I'm Down" | 1987 | Meet The Beatles |
| The Inmates | "Hey Jude" | 1987 | Meet The Beatles |
| Inner Circle | "Ob-La-Di, Ob-La-Da" | 1998 | Maxi CD Single ( 6 versions ) |
| Eddie Izzard | "Being for the Benefit of Mr. Kite!" | 2007 | Across the Universe: Music from the Motion Picture |
| J.Fla | "Ob-La-Di, Ob-La-Da" | 2012 | Old Covers |
| J.Fla | "Hey Jude" | 2018 | YouTube upload through their official channel |
| Joe Jackson | "Eleanor Rigby" | 2000 | Summer in the City: Live in New York |
| Joe Jackson | "For No One" | 2000 | Live performances on Night and Day II tour |
| Michael Jackson | "Come Together" | 1988/1992/1995 | Used in film Moonwalker, studio version released as b-side to "Remember the Time" single; edit released on HIStory |
| Willis Jackson | "A Hard Day's Night" | 2010 | Beatles Vs. Stones |
| The Jam | "And Your Bird Can Sing" | 1992 | Extras |
| The Jam | "Rain" | 1980 | Sound Affects ( Deluxe Edition – Disc 2 ) |
| Bobby Jameson | "Norwegian Wood" | 1969 | Working |
| Jan and Dean | "Back In the U.S.S.R." | 1982 | All Summer Night/Live |
| Jan and Dean | "I Should Have Known Better" | 1965 | Command Performance-Live In Person |
| Jan and Dean | "Michelle" | 1966 | Filet of Soul: A "Live" One |
| Jan and Dean | "Norwegian Wood" | 1966 | B-side of "Popsicle" (Liberty 55886) and Filet of Soul: A "Live" One |
| Jan and Dean | "Yesterday" | 1965 | Folk N' Roll |
| Jan and Dean | "You've Got to Hide Your Love Away" | 1966 | Filet of Soul: A "Live" One |
| Al Jarreau | "She's Leaving Home" | 1994 | Tenderness |
| Al Jarreau | "She's Leaving Home" | 1978 | All Fly Home |
| The Jazz Crusaders | "Eleanor Rigby" | 1968 | Lighthouse '68 |
| The Jazz Crusaders | "Hey Jude" | 1969 | Powerhouse |
| The Jazz Crusaders | "Get Back" | 1969 | Lighthouse '69 |
| Jefferson Starship | "Lady Madonna" | 2008 | Mick's Picks Vol. 2 ( Cavern Club, Liverpool 3/23/04 ) |
| Jefferson Starship | "While My Guitar Gently Weeps" | 2008 | Mick's Picks Vol. 4 / 09/09/07 BB King Blues Club – Disc 2 |
| Waylon Jennings | "You've Got to Hide Your Love Away" | 1967 | Love of the Common People |
| Joan as Police Woman | "I Will" | 2008 | Mojo Presents The White Album Recovered Vol. 1 |
| Billy Joel | "I'll Cry Instead" | 1983 | B-side of An Innocent Man |
| Billy Joel | "Back In the U.S.S.R." | 1987 | Kohuept |
| Billy Joel | "A Hard Day's Night" | 2005 | My Lives |
| Billy Joel | "Please Please Me" | 2008 | Live at Shea Stadium |
| Billy Joel | "She Loves You" | 2008 | Live at Shea Stadium |
| Billy Joel with Paul McCartney | "I Saw Her Standing There" | 2009 | Good Evening New York City |
| Billy Joel | "A Day in the Life" | | |
| Elton John | "Get Back" | 1971 | 11-17-70 |
| Elton John | "Lucy in the Sky with Diamonds" | 1974 | single, went to number one, also on Elton John's Greatest Hits Volume II |
| Elton John | "I Saw Her Standing There" | 1975 | with John Lennon, flip side of Philadelphia Freedom |
| Elton John | "Back In the U.S.S.R." | 1979 | live in the Soviet Union, featured in the To Russia ... With Elton video cassette tape |
| Elton John | "Come Together" | 2000 | One Night Only: The Greatest Hits Live at Madison Square Garden |
| John Butler Trio | "Across the Universe" | 2004 | What You Want |
| John Butler Trio | "Come Together" | | |
| John's Children | "Help!" | 1967 | Midsummer Night's Scene (ep, 1988) |
| Marc Johnson | "Within You Without You/Blue Jay Way" | 1993 | Come Together : Guitar Tribute To The Beatles |
| Syl Johnson | "Come Together" | 1970 | Is It Because I'm Black? |
| Randy Johnston | "Things We Said Today" | 2014 | The Beatles: A Jazz Tribute, Celebrating 50 Years |
| Jonas Brothers | "Hello, Goodbye" | 2008 | A Little Bit Longer bonus track |
| Jonas Brothers and Demi Lovato | "Hey Jude" | | Live performance |
| Jonas Brothers | "Drive My Car" | | Live performance at the White House |
| Booker T. Jones | "Can't Buy Me Love" | 2014 | The Art of McCartney |
| Jack Jones | "Yesterday" | 1966 | For The "In" Crowd |
| Jack Jones | "And I Love Her" | 1965 | There's Love & There's Love & There's Love |
| Jack Jones | "Michelle" | 1967 | Our Song |
| Norah Jones | "Across the Universe" | 2005 | Performed with others at the 2005 Grammy Awards |
| Rickie Lee Jones | "For No One" | 2000 | It's Like This |
| Tom Jones | "All You Need Is Love" | 1994 | single |
| Tom Jones | "Can't Buy Me Love" | 2007 | Tom Sings The Beatles |
| Tom Jones | "Come Together" | 1999 | "Burning Down The House" Maxi – Single with The Cardigans |
| Tom Jones | "Got to Get You into My Life" | 2007 | Tom Sings The Beatles |
| Tom Jones | "Hey Jude" | 1969 | Live In Las Vegas |
| Tom Jones | "Lady Madonna" | 2007 | Tom Sings The Beatles |
| Tom Jones | "Let It Be" | 2007 | Tom Sings The Beatles |
| Tom Jones | "The Long and Winding Road" | 2007 | Tom Sings The Beatles |
| Tom Jones | "We Can Work It Out" | 2007 | Tom Sings The Beatles |
| Tom Jones | "Yesterday" | 2007 | Tom Sings The Beatles |
| Sheila Jordan | "Little Song"/"Blackbird" | 2014 | The Beatles: A Jazz Tribute, Celebrating 50 Years |
| Stanley Jordan | "Eleanor Rigby" | 1985 | Magic Touch |
| José Alberto "El Canario" | "And I Love Her" | 1996 | Tropical Tribute to the Beatles |
| Journey | "It's All Too Much" | 1976 | Look into the Future |
| Laurence Juber | "I Saw Her Standing There" | 2000 | LJ Plays the Beatles |
| Laurence Juber | "Strawberry Fields Forever" | 2000 | LJ Plays the Beatles |
| Laurence Juber | "Let It Be" | 2000 | LJ Plays the Beatles |
| Laurence Juber | "Things We Said Today" | 2000 | LJ Plays the Beatles |
| Laurence Juber | "Yesterday" | 2000 | LJ Plays the Beatles |
| Laurence Juber | "Here Comes the Sun" | 2000 | LJ Plays the Beatles |
| Laurence Juber | "You Won't See Me" | 2000 | LJ Plays the Beatles |
| Laurence Juber | "Martha My Dear" | 2000 | LJ Plays the Beatles |
| Laurence Juber | "This Boy" | 2000 | LJ Plays the Beatles |
| Laurence Juber | "Oh! Darling" | 2000 | LJ Plays the Beatles |
| Laurence Juber | "In My Life" | 2000 | LJ Plays the Beatles |
| Laurence Juber | "While My Guitar Gently Weeps" | 2000 | LJ Plays the Beatles |
| Laurence Juber | "For No One" | 2000 | LJ Plays the Beatles |
| Laurence Juber | "Can't Buy Me Love" | 2000 | LJ Plays the Beatles |
| Jump5 | "Hello, Goodbye" | 2007 | Hello & Goodbye |
| Bert Kaempfert | "Something" | 1970 | The Kaempfert Touch |
| Kaiser Chiefs | "Getting Better" | 2007 | Sgt. Pepper's Lonely Hearts Club Band – 40th Anniversary BBC Broadcast |
| Kansas with the London Symphony Orchestra | "Eleanor Rigby" | 1998 | Always Never the Same |
| Lucy Kaplansky | "I'm Looking Through You" | 2012 | Reunion |
| Kasabian | "I'm So Tired" | | Live |
| Phil Keaggy & PFR | "We Can Work It Out" | 1995 | Come Together: America Salutes The Beatles |
| Keane | "Paperback Writer" | 2005 | "Strangers" DVD ( Background Track ) |
| Dustin Kensrue | "Oh! Darling" | 2004 | Live At The Knitting Factory, LA 20 August 2004 |
| The Kentucky Headhunters | "You've Got to Hide Your Love Away" | 1994 | The Best of The Kentucky Headhunters: Still Pickin' |
| Sammy Kershaw | "If I Fell" | 1995 | Come Together: America Salutes The Beatles |
| Alicia Keys | "Across the Universe" | 2005 | 47th Grammy Awards |
| Bob Khaleel | "Here Comes the Sun" | 1988 | The Parent Trap soundtrack |
| Chaka Khan | "We Can Work It Out" | 1981 | What Cha Gonna Do For Me |
| Kids Incorporated | "Help!" | 1988 | Season 5 |
| Kids Incorporated | "Paperback Writer" | 1988 | Season 5 |
| Kids Incorporated | "We Can Work It Out" | 1988 | Season 5 |
| Kids Incorporated | "All You Need Is Love" | 1989 | Season 6 |
| Kids Incorporated | "Can't Buy Me Love" | 1989 | Season 6 |
| Kids Incorporated | "From Me to You" | 1989 | season 6 |
| Kids Incorporated | "Love Me Do" | 1989 | Season 6 |
| Kids Incorporated | "In My Life" | 1993 | Season 9 |
| Kids Incorporated | "Ticket to Ride" | 1993 | Season 9 |
| The Killers | "Helter Skelter" | 2007 | Live performance |
| Morgana King | "Got to Get You into My Life" | 1968 | I Know How It Feels to Be Lonely |
| Morgana King | "Eleanor Rigby" | 1968 | I Know How It Feels to Be Lonely |
| Morgana King | "Tomorrow Never Knows" | 1968 | I Know How It Feels to Be Lonely |
| Morgana King | "Golden Slumbers" | 1979 | Higher Ground |
| Morgana King | "The Long and Winding Road" | 1979 | Higher Ground |
| King Crimson | "Free as a Bird" | 2001 | Vrooom Vrooom |
| King Missile | "We Can Work It Out" | 1992 | Downtown Does The Beatles : Live At The Knitting Factory |
| Kingmaker | "Lady Madonna" | 1992 | Ruby Trax |
| King's Singers | "Penny Lane" | 1986 | Beatles' Connection |
| King's Singers | "Mother Nature's Son" | 1986 | Beatles' Connection |
| King's Singers | "Ob-La-Di, Ob-La-Da" | 1986 | Beatles' Connection |
| King's Singers | "And I Love Her" | 1986 | Beatles' Connection |
| King's Singers | "Help!" | 1986 | Beatles' Connection |
| King's Singers | "Yesterday" | 1986 | Beatles' Connection |
| King's Singers | "A Hard Day's Night" | 1986 | Beatles' Connection |
| King's Singers | "Girl" | 1986 | Beatles' Connection |
| King's Singers | "Got To Get You Into My Life" | 1986 | Beatles' Connection |
| King's Singers | "Back In the U.S.S.R." | 1986 | Beatles' Connection |
| King's Singers | "Eleanor Rigby" | 1986 | Beatles' Connection |
| King's Singers | "Blackbird" | 1986 | Beatles' Connection |
| King's Singers | "Lady Madonna" | 1986 | Beatles' Connection |
| King's Singers | "I'll Follow the Sun" | 1986 | Beatles' Connection |
| King's Singers | "Honey Pie" | 1986 | Beatles' Connection |
| King's Singers | "Can't Buy Me Love" | 1986 | Beatles' Connection |
| King's Singers | "Michelle" | 1986 | Beatles' Connection |
| King's Singers | "You've Got To Hide Your Love Away" | 1986 | Beatles' Connection |
| King's Singers | "I Want To Hold Your Hand" | 1986 | Beatles' Connection |
| Gershon Kingsley | "Eleanor Rigby" | 1970 | First Moog Quartet |
| Gershon Kingsley | "Nowhere Man" | 1969 | Music to Moog By |
| Gershon Kingsley | "Paperback Writer" | 1969 | Music to Moog By |
| The Kingsmen | "A Hard Day's Night" | 1965 | On Campus |
| The Kingsmen | "If I Needed Someone" | 1966 | Up And Away |
| David Kitt | "And Your Bird Can Sing" | 2004 | The Black And Red Notebook |
| The Knack | "A Hard Day's Night" | 1979 | Live at Carnegie Hall |
| Gladys Knight & the Pips | "Let It Be" | 1971 | If I Were Your Woman |
| Kommunizm | "Let It Be" | 1989 | Лет ит би |
| Korol i Shut | "Yellow Submarine" | 1997 | Live performance |
| Diana Krall | "And I Love Her" | 1995 | (I Got No Kick Against) Modern Jazz |
| Billy J. Kramer with the Dakotas | "Do You Want to Know a Secret" | 1963 | single |
| Alison Krauss | "I Will" | 1995 | Now That I've Found You: A Collection |
| Kris Kristofferson | "Paperback Writer" | 1995 | Come Together: America Salutes the Beatles |
| K's Choice | "Come Together" | 1998 | TV programme 2 Meter Sessies |
| Kult | "With a Little Help from My Friends" | 2001 | Salon Recreativo |
| Erich Kunzel & Cincinnati Pops Orchestra feat. King's Singers | "Eleanor Rigby Orchestral Version" | 2001 | Perform Music Of The Beatles |
| Erich Kunzel & Cincinnati Pops Orchestra feat. King's Singers | "Michelle" | 2001 | Perform Music Of The Beatles |
| Erich Kunzel & Cincinnati Pops Orchestra feat. King's Singers | "Ob-La-Di, Ob-La-Da" | 2001 | Perform Music Of The Beatles |
| Erich Kunzel & Cincinnati Pops Orchestra feat. King's Singers | "Penny Lane" | 2001 | Perform Music Of The Beatles |
| Erich Kunzel & Cincinnati Pops Orchestra feat. King's Singers | "Sgt. Pepper's Lonely Hearts Club Band" | 2001 | Perform Music Of The Beatles |
| Erich Kunzel & Cincinnati Pops Orchestra feat. King's Singers | "Yesterday" | 2001 | Perform Music Of The Beatles |
| Erich Kunzel & Cincinnati Pops Orchestra feat. King's Singers | "The Long And Winding Road" | 2001 | Perform Music Of The Beatles |
| Erich Kunzel & Cincinnati Pops Orchestra feat. King's Singers | "All You Need Is Love" | 2001 | Perform Music Of The Beatles |
| Erich Kunzel & Cincinnati Pops Orchestra feat. King's Singers | "Across The Universe" | 2001 | Perform Music Of The Beatles |
| Erich Kunzel & Cincinnati Pops Orchestra feat. King's Singers | "Because" | 2001 | Perform Music Of The Beatles |
| Erich Kunzel & Cincinnati Pops Orchestra feat. King's Singers | "Hey Jude" | 2001 | Perform Music Of The Beatles |
| Erich Kunzel & Cincinnati Pops Orchestra feat. King's Singers | "Let It Be" | 2001 | Perform Music Of The Beatles |
| Erich Kunzel & Cincinnati Pops Orchestra feat. King's Singers | "When I'm Sixty-Four" | 2001 | Perform Music Of The Beatles |
| Erich Kunzel & Cincinnati Pops Orchestra feat. King's Singers | "Octopus's Garden" | 2001 | Perform Music Of The Beatles |
| Erich Kunzel & Cincinnati Pops Orchestra feat. King's Singers | "Eleanor Rigby" | 2001 | Perform Music Of The Beatles |
| Erich Kunzel & Cincinnati Pops Orchestra feat. King's Singers | "Here, There And Everywhere" | 2001 | Perform Music Of The Beatles |
| Ben Kweller with Albert Hammond Jr. | "Wait" | 2005 | This Bird Has Flown – A 40th Anniversary Tribute to the Beatles' Rubber Soul |
| Labyrinth | "Come Together" | 2007 | 6 Days to Nowhere |
| Francis Lai | "Carry That Weight" | 1997 | On The Rocks 2 : High Fidelity – Low Anxiety |
| Laibach | "Let It Be" | 1988 | Let It Be (Complete Album) |
| Laibach | "Get Back" | 1988 | Let It Be |
| Laibach | "Let It Be" | 1988 | Let It Be (Complete Album) |
| Laibach | "Two of Us" | 1988 | Let It Be (Complete Album) |
| Laibach | "Dig It" | 1988 | Let It Be (Complete Album) |
| Cleo Laine & John C Williams | "Eleanor Rigby" | 1976 | Best Friends |
| Denny Laine | "Blackbird" | 1999 | A Tribute to Paul McCartney & Wings |
| Frankie Laine | "Maxwell's Silver Hammer" | 1976 | All This and World War II (Soundtrack) |
| Greg Lake | "You've Got to Hide Your Love Away" | 2013 | Songs of a Lifetime |
| Lakeside | "I Want to Hold Your Hand" | 1982 | Your Wish Is My Command |
| Lana Lane | "Across the Universe" | 1998 / 2000 | Ballad Collection / Ballad Collection - Special Edition |
| James Last | "Eleanor Rigby" | 1983 | James Last spielt die größten Songs von The Beatles (James Last sings the greatest Songs of The Beatles) |
| James Last | "A Hard Day's Night" | 1983 | James Last spielt die größten Songs von The Beatles (James Last sings the greatest Songs of The Beatles) |
| James Last | "Let It Be" | 1983 | James Last spielt die größten Songs von The Beatles (James Last sings the greatest Songs of The Beatles) |
| James Last | "Penny Lane" | 1983 | James Last spielt die größten Songs von The Beatles (James Last sings the greatest Songs of The Beatles) |
| James Last | "She Loves You" | 1983 | James Last spielt die größten Songs von The Beatles (James Last sings the greatest Songs of The Beatles) |
| James Last | "Michelle" | 1983 | James Last spielt die größten Songs von The Beatles (James Last sings the greatest Songs of The Beatles) |
| James Last | "Ob-La-Di, Ob-La-Da" | 1983 | James Last spielt die größten Songs von The Beatles (James Last sings the greatest Songs of The Beatles) |
| James Last | "Hey Jude" | 1983 | James Last spielt die größten Songs von The Beatles (James Last sings the greatest Songs of The Beatles) |
| James Last | "Lady Madonna" | 1983 | James Last spielt die größten Songs von The Beatles (James Last sings the greatest Songs of The Beatles) |
| James Last | "All You Need Is Love" | 1983 | James Last spielt die größten Songs von The Beatles (James Last sings the greatest Songs of The Beatles) |
| James Last | "Norwegian Wood (This Bird Has Flown)" | 1983 | James Last spielt die größten Songs von The Beatles (James Last sings the greatest Songs of The Beatles) |
| James Last | "Yesterday" | 1983 | James Last spielt die größten Songs von The Beatles (James Last sings the greatest Songs of The Beatles) |
| Yusef Lateef | "Michelle" | 1970 | Suite 16 |
| Jim Lauderdale | "I'm Looking Through You" | 2013 | Let Us In Americana: The Music of Paul McCartney |
| Cyndi Lauper | "Strawberry Fields Forever" | 2001 | Come Together: A Night for John Lennon's Words and Music |
| Cyndi Lauper | "Hey Bulldog" | 1990 | John Lennon tribute concert in Liverpool |
| Cyndi Lauper | "Across the Universe" | | |
| Cyndi Lauper | "A Day in the Life" | 2010 | John Lennon tribute concert in NYC – 12 Nov 2010 |
| Lautten Compagney | "Another Girl" | 2021 | Time Travel |
| Bettye LaVette | "The Word" | 2010 | Interpretations: The British Rock Songbook |
| Fausto Leali | "Please Please Me" | 1963 | single |
| Led Zeppelin | "I Saw Her Standing There" | 1970 | Live on Blueberry Hill |
| Led Zeppelin | "From Me to You" | | (live only) |
| Led Zeppelin | "Please Please Me" | | (live only) |
| Ben Lee | "In My Life" | 2005 | This Bird Has Flown – A 40th Anniversary Tribute to the Beatles' Rubber Soul |
| Brenda Lee | "Can't Buy Me Love" | 1965 | Brenda Lee Sings Top Teen Hits |
| Brenda Lee | "She Loves You" | 1965 | Brenda Lee Sings Top Teen Hits Released as "He Loves You" |
| Brenda Lee | "Yesterday" | 1966 | Bye Bye Blues |
| Peggy Lee | "A Hard Day's Night" | 1965 | Pass Me By |
| Peggy Lee | "Something" | 1969 | Is That All There Is? |
| Rita Lee | "And I Love Her" as "And I Love Him" | 1970 | Build Up |
| Rita Lee | "A Hard Day's Night" | 2001 | Aqui, Ali, Em Qualquer Lugar |
| Rita Lee | "With a Little Help from My Friends" | 2001 | Aqui, Ali, Em Qualquer Lugar |
| Rita Lee | "Pra Você Eu Digo Sim" (If I Fell) | 2001 | Aqui, Ali, Em Qualquer Lugar |
| Rita Lee | "All My Loving Listen" | 2001 | Aqui, Ali, Em Qualquer Lugar |
| Rita Lee | "Minha Vida" (In My Life) | 2001 | Aqui, Ali, Em Qualquer Lugar |
| Rita Lee | "She Loves You" | 2001 | Aqui, Ali, Em Qualquer Lugar |
| Rita Lee | "Michelle" | 2001 | Aqui, Ali, Em Qualquer Lugar |
| Rita Lee | "Aqui, Ali, em Qualquer Lugar" (Here, There and Everywhere) | 2001 | Aqui, Ali, Em Qualquer Lugar |
| Rita Lee | "I Want to Hold Your Hand" | 2001 | Aqui, Ali, Em Qualquer Lugar |
| Rita Lee | "Tudo Por Amor" (Can't Buy Me Love) | 2001 | Aqui, Ali, Em Qualquer Lugar |
| Rita Lee | "Lucy in the Sky with Diamonds" | 2001 | Aqui, Ali, Em Qualquer Lugar |
| Rita Lee | "The Fool on the Hill" | 1991 | Bossa 'N ' Roll |
| Claudia Lennear | "Let It Be" | 1971 | " The Ballad Of Mad Dogs & Englishmen" single |
| Julian Lennon | "When I'm Sixty-Four" | 2002 | Allstate Insurance commercial |
| Julian Lennon | "It Won't Be Long" | | |
| Sean Lennon | "Julia" | 2001 | Come Together: A Night for John Lennon's Words and Music |
| Sean Lennon | "We Can Work It Out" | 2007 | BBC Electric Proms (with Daniel Merriweather and Tawiah) |
| Sean Lennon | "Dear Prudence" | | |
| Sean Lennon | "You've Got To Hide Your Love Away" | | |
| Sean Lennon, Moby, & Rufus Wainwright | "Across the Universe" | 2001 | Come Together: A Night for John Lennon's Words and Music |
| Sean Lennon & Rufus Wainwright | "This Boy" | 2001 | Come Together: A Night for John Lennon's Words and Music |
| Ted Leo | "I'm Looking Through You" | 2005 | This Bird Has Flown – A 40th Anniversary Tribute to the Beatles' Rubber Soul |
| Phil Lesh | "Strawberry Fields Forever" | | |
| Blake Lewis & Jordin Sparks | "I Saw Her Standing There" | 2007 | American Idol finale |
| Huey Lewis | "Oh! Darling" | 1995 | Come Together: America Salutes The Beatles |
| Jerry Lee Lewis with Little Richard | "I Saw Her Standing There" | 2006 | Last Man Standing |
| Jon Peter Lewis | "I'm Looking Through You" | | |
| Ramsey Lewis | "A Hard Day's Night" | 1964 | In Person 1960–1967 |
| Ramsey Lewis | "And I Love Her" | 1965 | Hang On Ramsey |
| Ramsey Lewis | "Mother Nature's Son" | 1968 | Mother Nature's Son |
| Ramsey Lewis | "Rocky Raccoon" | 1968 | Mother Nature's Son |
| Ramsey Lewis | "Julia" | 1968 | Mother Nature's Son |
| Ramsey Lewis | "Back In the U.S.S.R." | 1968 | Mother Nature's Son |
| Ramsey Lewis | "Dear Prudence" | 1968 | Mother Nature's Son |
| Ramsey Lewis | "Cry Baby Cry" | 1968 | Mother Nature's Son |
| Ramsey Lewis | "Good Night" | 1968 | Mother Nature's Son |
| Ramsey Lewis | "Everybody's Got Something to Hide Except Me and My Monkey" | 1968 | Mother Nature's Son |
| Ramsey Lewis | "Sexy Sadie" | 1968 | Mother Nature's Son |
| Ramsey Lewis | "Blackbird" | 1968 | Mother Nature's Son |
| Ramsey Lewis | "Michelle" | 1995 | (I Got No Kick Against) Modern Jazz |
| Ramsey Lewis | "In My Life" | 2003 | Simple Pleasures |
| Ramsey Lewis | "Day Tripper" | 2010 | Plays The Beatles Songbook |
| Liberace | "Here, There, and Everywhere" | 1969 | Brand New Me |
| Liberace | "Something" | 1969 | Brand New Me |
| The Libertines | "Eight Days A Week" | 2003 | |
| The Libertines | "A Day in the Life" | 2007 | |
| Enoch Light | "Penny Lane" | 1974 | Beatles Classics |
| Enoch Light | "Eleanor Rigby" | 1974 | Beatles Classics |
| Enoch Light | "Hello Goodbye" | 1974 | Beatles Classics |
| Enoch Light | "Lucy in the Sky with Diamonds" | 1974 | Beatles Classics Recorded as "Lucy in the Sky (With Diamonds") |
| Enoch Light | "Michelle" | 1974 | Beatles Classics |
| Enoch Light | "Hey Jude" | 1974 | Beatles Classics |
| Enoch Light | "Norwegian Wood (This Bird Has Flown)" | 1974 | Beatles Classics |
| Enoch Light | "With a Little Help from My Friends" | 1974 | Beatles Classics |
| Enoch Light | "Let It Be" | 1974 | Beatles Classics |
| Lil Wayne | "Help!" | 2007 | The Drought Is Over Pt.2 (The Carter III Sessions MixTape) |
| Colin Linden | "Blackbird" | 2006 | The Blues White Album |
| Arto Lindsay | "Don't Let Me Down" | 1992 | Downtown Does the Beatles Live at the Knitting Factory |
| Linkin Park | "Yesterday" | 2006 | 48th Grammy Awards (with Jay-Z and Paul McCartney) |
| Dua Lipa | "Golden Slumbers" | 2017 | |
| Liquid Blue | "All You Need Is Love" | 2008 | Step Inside Love - a Jazzy Tribute to the Beatles |
| Little Richard | "A Hard Day's Night" | | |
| Little Texas | "Help!" | 1995 | Come Together: America Salutes The Beatles |
| The Living End | "I've Just Seen a Face" | 2001 | "Roll On" single |
| Nils Lofgren | "Any Time at All" | 1981 | Night Fades Away |
| Kenny Loggins | "Here, There and Everywhere" | 1980 | Kenny Loggins Alive |
| Kenny Loggins | "All Together Now" | 2009 | All Join In |
| Kenny Loggins & Alison Krauss | "Good Night" | 2000 | More Songs from Pooh Corner |
| Kenny Loggins & Jim Messina | "Two of Us" | 2009 | All Join In |
| Fred Lonberg-Holm | "Taxman" | 1992 | Downtown Does The Beatles : Live At The Knitting Factory |
| Julie London | "And I Love Him" | 1969 | Yummy, Yummy, Yummy |
| London Symphony Orchestra | "The End" | 1976 | All This and World War II (Soundtrack) |
| London Symphony Orchestra | "A Day in the Life" | 1978 | Classic Rock: The Second Movement |
| London Symphony Orchestra | "If I Fell" | 2010 | The Beatles Classics |
| London Symphony Orchestra | "Across the Universe" | 2010 | The Beatles Classics |
| London Symphony Orchestra | "And I Love Her" | 2010 | The Beatles Classics |
| London Symphony Orchestra | "Eight Days a Week" | 2010 | The Beatles Classics |
| London Symphony Orchestra | "Don't Pass Me By" | 2010 | The Beatles Classics |
| London Symphony Orchestra | "While My Guitar Gently Weeps" | 2010 | The Beatles Classics |
| London Symphony Orchestra | "Strawberry Fields Forever" | 2010 | The Beatles Classics |
| London Symphony Orchestra | "Martha My Dear" | 2010 | The Beatles Classics |
| London Symphony Orchestra | "Julia" | 2010 | The Beatles Classics |
| London Symphony Orchestra | "Day Tripper" | 2010 | The Beatles Classics |
| London Symphony Orchestra | "Mother Nature's Son" | 2010 | The Beatles Classics |
| London Symphony Orchestra | "Something" | 2010 | The Beatles Classics |
| London Symphony Orchestra | "Because" | 2010 | The Beatles Classics |
| London Symphony Orchestra | "Paperback Writer" | 2010 | The Beatles Classics |
| London Symphony Orchestra | "We Can Work It Out" | 2010 | The Beatles Classics |
| London Symphony Orchestra | "Blackbird" | 2010 | The Beatles Classics |
| Lone Star | "She Said She Said" | 1976 | Lone Star |
| Claudine Longet | "When I'm Sixty-Four" | 1967 | The Look of Love |
| Claudine Longet | "Good Day Sunshine" | 1967 | The Look of Love |
| Los Lobos | "Tomorrow Never Knows" | 1993 | PBS In The Spotlight: A Beatles Songbook TV special, aired 5 May 1993 |
| Demi Lovato & Naya Rivera | "Here Comes The Sun" | 2013 | Glee ("Tina in the Sky with Diamonds") |
| Darlene Love | "All My Loving" | 2014 | The Art of McCartney |
| Low | "Nowhere Man" | 2005 | This Bird Has Flown – A 40th Anniversary Tribute to the Beatles' Rubber Soul |
| Arjen Anthony Lucassen | "When I'm Sixty-Four" | 2005 | Ayreon single "Come Back to Me" |
| Tony Lucca & Adam Levine | "Yesterday" | 2012 | The Voice performance |
| Lulu | "Day Tripper" | 1967 | Love Loves to Love Lulu |
| Lydia Lunch | "Why Don't We Do It in the Road?" | 1994 | Transmutation |
| Lydia | "Across the Universe" | 2001 | single |
| Kenny Lynch | "Misery" | 1963 | We Like Kenny |
| Jeff Lynne | "With a Little Help from My Friends/Nowhere Man" | 1976 | All This and World War II (Soundtrack) |
| Jeff Lynne | "I Want to Tell You" | 2003 | Concert for George |
| Jeff Lynne, Dhani Harrison and Anoushka Shankar | "The Inner Light" | 2003 | Concert for George |
| Yo-Yo Ma & James Taylor | "Here Comes the Sun" | 2008 | Songs of Joy & Peace |
| Mae | "A Day in the Life" | 2006 | The Everglow EP |
| Vanessa-Mae | "Because" | 1998 | In My Life |
| La Mafia | "Let It Be" | 1995 | Hey Jude (Tributo A Los Beatles) |
| The Magic Numbers | "She's Leaving Home" | 2007 | It Was 40 Years Ago Today television program |
| Magneto | "With a Little Help From My Friends" (Con La Ayuda De La Amistad) | 1995 | Hey Jude (Tributo A Los Beatles) |
| Mägo de Oz | "While My Guitar Gently Weeps" | | |
| Miriam Makeba | "In My Life" | 1970 | Keep Me In Mind |
| Will Malone & Lou Reizner | "You Never Give Me Your Money" | 1976 | All This and World War II (Soundtrack) |
| Ramiele Malubay | "In My Life" | 2008 | American Idol performance |
| Ramiele Malubay | "I Should Have Known Better" | 2008 | American Idol performance |
| Mamá Ladilla | "Helter Skelter" | 1994 | Directamente De La Basura (Diez Años Macerando) |
| The Mamas & the Papas | "I Call Your Name" | 1966 | If You Can Believe Your Eyes and Ears |
| Mando Diao | "A Hard Day's Night" | 2006 | The Malevolence of Mando Diao |
| Barbara Mandrell | "Something" | 1974 | This Time I Almost Made It |
| Manfred Mann's Earth Band | "Hey Bulldog" | 1986 | Criminal Tango |
| Mango | "Michelle" | 2002 | Disincanto |
| The Manhattan Transfer | "Good Night" | 1992 | The Christmas Album |
| Barry Manilow | "And I Love Her" | 2006 | The Greatest Songs of the Sixties |
| Barry Manilow | "Yesterday" | 2006 | The Greatest Songs of the Sixties (UK version) |
| Barry Manilow | "The Long and Winding Road" | 2007 | The Greatest Songs of the Seventies |
| Aimee Mann & Michael Penn | "Two of Us" | 2002 | I Am Sam soundtrack |
| Herbie Mann | "Yesterday" | 1966 | Today! |
| Herbie Mann | "The Night Before" | 1966 | Today! |
| Herbie Mann | "Norwegian Wood (This Bird Has Flown)" | 1968 | The Wailing Dervishes |
| Herbie Mann | "Flying" | 1970 | Stone Flute |
| Herbie Mann | "Come Together" | 1970 | Muscle Shoals Nitty Gritty |
| Herbie Mann | "You Never Give Me Your Money" | 1974 | London Underground |
| Herbie Mann | "Ob-La-Di, Ob-La-Da" | 1973 | Reggae |
| Herbie Mann and Tamiko Jones | "Day Tripper" | 1967 | A Mann & a Woman |
| Johnny Mann Singers | "All My Loving" | 1964 | Released on Liberty LST7391 |
| Johnny Mann Singers | "And I Love Her" | 1964 | Released on Liberty LST7391 |
| Johnny Mann Singers | "Do You Want to Know a Secret" | 1964 | Released on Liberty LST7391 |
| Johnny Mann Singers | "From Me to You" | 1964 | Released on Liberty LST7391 |
| Johnny Mann Singers | "If I Fell" | 1964 | Released on Liberty LST7391 |
| Johnny Mann Singers | "I'll Be Back" | 1964 | Released on Liberty LST7391 |
| Johnny Mann Singers | "I'm Happy Just to Dance with You" | 1964 | Released on Liberty LST7391 |
| Johnny Mann Singers | "Love Me Do" | 1964 | Released on Liberty LST7391 |
| Johnny Mann Singers | "P.S. I Love You" | 1964 | Released on Liberty LST7391 |
| Johnny Mann Singers | "This Boy (Ringo's Theme)" | 1964 | Released on Liberty LST7391 |
| Johnny Mann Singers | "She Loves You" | 1964 | Released on Liberty LST7391 |
| Johnny Mann Singers | "Things We Said Today" | 1964 | Released on Liberty LST7391 |
| Marilyn Manson | "Come Together" | 2001 | From Highway To Hell – The Ultimate Cover Collection (boot) |
| Marilyn Manson | "Helter Skelter" | 2018 | Helter Skelter ( with Rob Zombie ) |
| Manual Scan | "For No One" | 2020 | Music For Gloves |
| Manny Manuel | "I Want to Hold Your Hand" | 1996 | Tropical Tribute to the Beatles |
| The Manvils | "Helter Skelter" | 2007 | Strange Disaster EP |
| Marillion | "Blackbird" | 1999 | Unplugged at the Walls |
| Marillion | "Good Morning Good Morning" | 2007 | This Strange Convention |
| Marillion | "Let It Be" | 2000 | A Piss-Up in a Brewery |
| Marmalade | "Ob-La-Di, Ob-La-Da" | 1968 | single |
| Maroon 5 | "If I Fell" | 2004 | 1.22.03.Acoustic |
| Martha & the Vandellas | "Something" | 1970 | Natural Resources |
| George Martin Orchestra | "Yellow Submarine" | | Yellow Submarine; incorporated in 'Yellow Submarine in Pepperland' |
| George Martin Orchestra | "Ticket to Ride" | 1965 | Help! |
| George Martin Orchestra | "Help!" | 1965 | Help! |
| George Martin Orchestra | "Another Girl" | 1965 | Help! |
| George Martin Orchestra | "You're Going To Lose That Girl" | 1965 | Help! |
| George Martin Orchestra | "I Need You" | 1965 | Help! |
| George Martin Orchestra | "You've Got to Hide Your Love Away" | 1965 | Help! |
| George Martin Orchestra | "The Night Before" | 1965 | Help! |
| George Martin Orchestra | "I've Just Seen a Face" | 1965 | Help! |
| George Martin Orchestra | "It's Only Love" | 1965 | Help! |
| George Martin Orchestra | "Tell Me What You See" | 1965 | Help! |
| George Martin Orchestra | "Yesterday" | 1965 | Help! |
| George Martin Orchestra | "Eleanor Rigby" | 1966 | George Martin Instrumentally Salutes "The Beatle Girls" |
| George Martin Orchestra | "Girl" | 1966 | George Martin Instrumentally Salutes "The Beatle Girls" |
| George Martin Orchestra | "She Said, She Said" | 1966 | George Martin Instrumentally Salutes "The Beatle Girls" |
| George Martin Orchestra | "I'm Only Sleeping" | 1966 | George Martin Instrumentally Salutes "The Beatle Girls" |
| George Martin Orchestra | "Michelle" | 1966 | George Martin Instrumentally Salutes "The Beatle Girls" |
| George Martin Orchestra | "Got to Get You into My Life" | 1966 | George Martin Instrumentally Salutes "The Beatle Girls" |
| George Martin Orchestra | "Yellow Submarine" | 1966 | George Martin Instrumentally Salutes "The Beatle Girls" |
| George Martin Orchestra | "Here, There and Everywhere" | 1966 | George Martin Instrumentally Salutes "The Beatle Girls" |
| George Martin Orchestra | "And Your Bird Can Sing" | 1966 | George Martin Instrumentally Salutes "The Beatle Girls" |
| George Martin Orchestra | "Good Day Sunshine" | 1966 | George Martin Instrumentally Salutes "The Beatle Girls" |
| Moon Martin | "All I've Got to Do" | 1978 | Shots from a Cold Nightmare |
| Ricky Martin | "Day Tripper" | 1995 | Hey Jude (Tributo A Los Beatles) |
| Steve Martin | "Maxwell's Silver Hammer" | 1978 | Sgt. Pepper's Lonely Hearts Club Band soundtrack |
| Melanie Martinez | "Strawberry Fields Forever" | | |
| Hank Marvin | "A Hard Day's Night" | 2000 | Marvin at the Movies |
| Hank Marvin | "Eleanor Rigby" | 2002 | The Guitar Player |
| Hank Marvin | "Here, There and Everywhere" | 2007 | Guitar Man |
| Hank Marvin | "While My Guitar Gently Weeps" | 2007 | Guitar Man |
| Richard Marx | "Help!" | 1989 | Live at the Berlin Wall |
| Richard Marx | "And I Love Her" | 2008 | Sundown (with Vince Gill) |
| Matchbox Twenty | "She Came in Through the Bathroom Window" | 2008 | Soundstage and Live from Abbey Road TV shows |
| Matchbox Twenty | "Don't Let Me Down" | | |
| Johnny Mathis | "Michelle" | 1966 | The Shadow of Your Smile |
| Johnny Mathis | "Yesterday" | 1966 | The Shadow of Your Smile |
| Johnny Mathis | "We Can Work It Out" | 1971 | You've Got a Friend |
| Matia Bazar | "Yesterday" | 1977 | Gran Bazar |
| Dave Matthews | "In My Life" | 2001 | Come Together: A Night for John Lennon's Words and Music |
| Paul Mauriat | "Lady Madonna" | 1967 | Prevailing Airs |
| Paul Mauriat | "Michelle" | 1967 | Mauriat Magic |
| Paul Mauriat | "Hey Jude" | 1969 | Doing My Thing |
| Paul Mauriat | "Let It Be" | 1970 | Gone is Love |
| Paul Mauriat | "Penny Lane" | 1967 | Blooming Hits |
| Paul Mauriat | "Get Back" | 1969 | L.O.V.E. |
| John Mayer with Keith Urban | "Don't Let Me Down" | 2013 | Eric Clapton Guitar Festival Crossroads |
| Jesse McCartney | "Blackbird" | 2005 | Off the Record EP |
| Mary McCaslin | "Things We Said Today" | 1977 | Old Friends |
| Delbert McClinton | "Come Together" | 1995 | Come Together: America Salutes The Beatles |
| Marilyn McCoo and Billy Davis Jr. | "Blackbird" | 2021 | Blackbird Lennon-McCartney Icons |
| Marilyn McCoo and Billy Davis Jr. | "Got To Get You Into My Life" | 2021 | Blackbird Lennon-McCartney Icons |
| Marilyn McCoo and Billy Davis Jr. | "And I Love Her" | 2021 | Blackbird Lennon-McCartney Icons |
| Marilyn McCoo and Billy Davis Jr. | "The Long and Winding Road" | 2021 | Blackbird Lennon-McCartney Icons |
| Marilyn McCoo and Billy Davis Jr. | "Yesterday" | 2021 | Blackbird Lennon-McCartney Icons |
| Marilyn McCoo and Billy Davis Jr. | "The Fool on the Hill" | 2021 | Blackbird Lennon-McCartney Icons |
| Marilyn McCoo and Billy Davis Jr. | "Ticket to Ride" | 2021 | Blackbird Lennon-McCartney Icons |
| Marilyn McCoo and Billy Davis Jr. | "Help!" | 2021 | Blackbird Lennon-McCartney Icons |
| Del McCoury Band | "When I'm 64" | 2008 | Moneyland |
| Martin Luther McCoy | "While My Guitar Gently Weeps" | 2007 | Across the Universe soundtrack |
| Martin Luther McCoy | "Oh! Darling" | 2007 | Across the Universe soundtrack |
| Martin Luther McCoy | "Don't Let Me Down" | 2007 | Across the Universe soundtrack |
| Martin Luther McCoy | "Because" | 2007 | Across the Universe soundtrack |
| The McCrary Sisters with Amy Helm, Fiona McBain and Allison Moorer | "Let It Be" | 2013 | Let Us In Americana: The Music of Paul McCartney |
| Scotty McCreery | "Hello, Goodbye" | 2011 | American Idol Las Vegas Round |
| Ian McCulloch | "For No One" | 2014 | The Art of McCartney |
| Bobby McFerrin | "Blackbird" | 1984 | The Voice |
| Bobby McFerrin | "From Me to You" | 1985 | Spontaneous Inventions |
| Bobby McFerrin | "Drive My Car" | 1988 | Simple Pleasures |
| McFly | "Help!" | 2004 | "Obviously" single |
| McFly | "She Loves You" | 2004 | "That Girl" single |
| McFly | "I Want to Hold Your Hand" | 2006 | Children in Need 2006 telethon |
| Maureen McGovern | "Rocky Raccoon" | 2008 | A Long and Winding Road |
| Maureen McGovern | "Let It Be" | 2008 | A Long and Winding Road |
| Maureen McGovern | "The Long and Winding Road" | 2008 | A Long and Winding Road |
| Ewan McGregor | "All You Need Is Love" | 2001 | Part of "Elephant Love Medley" in Moulin Rouge! Music from Baz Luhrmann's Film soundtrack |
| Jimmy McGriff and Junior Parker | "The Inner Light" | 1970 | The Dudes Doin' Business |
| Roger McGuinn | "If I Needed Someone" | 2004 | Limited Edition |
| Nellie McKay | "If I Needed Someone" | 2005 | This Bird Has Flown – A 40th Anniversary Tribute to the Beatles' Rubber Soul |
| Sarah McLachlan | "Blackbird" | 2002 | I Am Sam soundtrack |
| Harold McNair | "Here, There And Everywhere" | 1970 | The Fence |
| Katharine McPhee | "Something" | 2008 | American Idol performance (with David Foster) |
| Carmen McRae | "Got To Get You Into My Life" | 1967 | For Once In My Life |
| Carmen McRae | "Something" | 1970 | Just a Little Lovin' |
| Carmen McRae | "Here, There and Everywhere" | 1970 | Just a Little Lovin' |
| Carmen McRae | "Carry That Weight" | 1970 | Just a Little Lovin' |
| Ralph McTell | "Michelle" | 2006 | Rubber Folk |
| Me First and the Gimme Gimmes | "All My Loving" | 2001 | Blow in the Wind |
| Me First and the Gimme Gimmes | "Strawberry Fields Forever" | 2004 | Ruin Jonny's Bar Mitzvah |
| Meat Loaf | "Let It Be" | 1995 | "Not a Dry Eye in the House" single |
| Meat Loaf | "Come Together" | 1995 | "Not a Dry Eye in the House" single |
| Brad Mehldau | "I Am the Walrus" | 2023 | Your Mother Should Know: Brad Mehldau Plays The Beatles |
| Brad Mehldau | "Your Mother Should Know" | 2023 | Your Mother Should Know: Brad Mehldau Plays The Beatles |
| Brad Mehldau | "I Saw Her Standing There" | 2023 | Your Mother Should Know: Brad Mehldau Plays The Beatles |
| Brad Mehldau | "For No One" | 2023 | Your Mother Should Know: Brad Mehldau Plays The Beatles |
| Brad Mehldau | "Baby's in Black" | 2023 | Your Mother Should Know: Brad Mehldau Plays The Beatles |
| Brad Mehldau | "She Said She Said" | 2023 | Your Mother Should Know: Brad Mehldau Plays The Beatles |
| Brad Mehldau | "Here, There and Everywhere" | 2023 | Your Mother Should Know: Brad Mehldau Plays The Beatles |
| Brad Mehldau | "If I Needed Someone" | 2023 | Your Mother Should Know: Brad Mehldau Plays The Beatles |
| Brad Mehldau | "Maxwell's Silver Hammer" | 2023 | Your Mother Should Know: Brad Mehldau Plays The Beatles |
| Brad Mehldau | "Golden Slumbers" | 2023 | Your Mother Should Know: Brad Mehldau Plays The Beatles |
| Brad Mehldau | "Dear Prudence" | 2002 | Largo |
| Brad Mehldau | "Mother Nature's Son" | 2002 | Largo |
| Brad Mehldau | "And I Love Her" | 2023 | Step Inside Love - a Jazzy Tribute to the Beatles |
| Brad Mehldau | "She's Leaving Home" | 2023 | Step Inside Love - a Jazzy Tribute to the Beatles |
| Brad Mehldau | "Martha My Dear" | 2023 | Step Inside Love - a Jazzy Tribute to the Beatles |
| Brad Mehldau | "Dear Prudence" | 2023 | Step Inside Love - a Jazzy Tribute to the Beatles |
| Brad Mehldau Trio | "Blackbird" | 1996 | Art of the Trio, vol. 1 |
| Rose Melberg | "I Will" | 1998 | Portola |
| Melanie | "We Can Work It Out" | 1978 | Phonogenic – Not Just Another Pretty Face |
| Melvins | "I Want to Tell You" | 2016 | Basses Loaded |
| Melvins | "I Want to Hold Your Hand" | 2018 | Pinkus Abortion Technician |
| Men Without Hats | "I Am the Walrus" | 1991 | Sideways |
| Sergio Mendes & Brasil '66 | "Daytripper" | 1966 | Herb Alpert Presents Sergio Mendes & Brasil '66 |
| Sergio Mendes & Brasil '66 | "With a Little Help from My Friends" | 1968 | Look Around |
| Sergio Mendes & Brasil '66 | "The Fool on the Hill" | 1968 | Fool on the Hill |
| Sergio Mendes & Brasil '66 | "Norwegian Wood" | 1970 | Ye Me Le |
| Sergio Mendes & Brasil '77 | "Here Comes The Sun" | 1973 | Sergio Mendes |
| Meninas Cantoras de Petrópolis | "Ticket to Ride" | 1998 | In My Life |
| Syesha Mercado | "Got to Get You into My Life" | 2008 | American Idol performance |
| Syesha Mercado | "Yesterday" | 2008 | American Idol performance |
| Natalie Merchant | "Nowhere Man" | 2001 | Come Together: A Night for John Lennon's Words and Music |
| MercyMe | "Ob-La-Di, Ob-La-Da" | 2011 | |
| Helen Merrill | "Let It Be" | 1970 | Helen Merrill Sings The Beatles |
| Helen Merrill | "Lady Madonna" | 1970 | Helen Merrill Sings The Beatles |
| Helen Merrill | "Because" | 1970 | Helen Merrill Sings The Beatles |
| Helen Merrill | "The Word" | 1970 | Helen Merrill Sings The Beatles |
| Helen Merrill | "Norwegian Wood (This Bird Has Flown)" | 1970 | Helen Merrill Sings The Beatles |
| Helen Merrill | "Here, There And Everywhere" | 1970 | Helen Merrill Sings The Beatles |
| Helen Merrill | "Golden Slumbers" | 1970 | Helen Merrill Sings The Beatles |
| Helen Merrill | "And I Love Him" | 1970 | Helen Merrill Sings The Beatles |
| Helen Merrill | "In My Life" | 1970 | Helen Merrill Sings The Beatles |
| Helen Merrill | "Mother Nature's Son" | 1970 | Helen Merrill Sings The Beatles |
| Helen Merrill | "If I Fell" | 1970 | Helen Merrill Sings The Beatles |
| Helen Merrill | "I Want You (She's So Heavy)" | 1970 | Helen Merrill Sings The Beatles |
| Metallica | "Hey Jude" | 1995 | Fan Can 1 fan club release |
| Metallica | "In My Life" | 2009 | MusiCares |
| Pat Metheny | "And I Love Her" | 2001 | What's It All About |
| George Michael | "The Long and Winding Road" | 1999 | Concert for Linda |
| Lea Michele | "Yesterday" | 2013 | Glee ("Love Love Love") |
| Bette Midler | "In My Life" | 1991 | For the Boys soundtrack |
| Buddy Miller | "Yellow Submarine" | 2013 | Let Us In Americana: The Music of Paul McCartney |
| Marcus Miller | "Come Together" | 1995 | Tales |
| Mike Miller | "Julia" | 2008 | Step Inside Love - a Jazzy Tribute to the Beatles |
| Mike Miller | "I Am the Walrus" | 2008 | Step Inside Love - a Jazzy Tribute to the Beatles |
| Mrs. Miller | "A Hard Day's Night" | 1966 | Mrs. Miller's Greatest Hits |
| Mrs. Miller | "Yellow Submarine" | 1966 | Will Success Spoil Mrs. Miller? |
| Rhett Miller | "Girl" | 2005 | This Bird Has Flown – A 40th Anniversary Tribute to the Beatles' Rubber Soul |
| Steve Miller | "Hey Jude" | 2014 | The Art of McCartney |
| The Minions | "Revolution" | 2015 | Minions: Original Motion Picture Soundtrack |
| Liza Minnelli | "For No One" | 1968 | Liza Minnelli |
| Kylie Minogue | "Help!" | 1990 | John Lennon: The Tribute Concert |
| The Miracles | "And I Love Her" | 1970 | What Love Has...Joined Together |
| The Miracles | "Yesterday" | 1968 | Special Occasion |
| The Mission | "Tomorrow Never Knows" | 1987 | B-side to "Severina" single |
| Chad Mitchell Trio | "She Loves You" | 1967 | Alive |
| Eddy Mitchell | "Le fou sur la colline" ("The Fool on the Hill" in French) | 1968 | Sept Colts pour Schmoll |
| Mocca | "I Will" | | Untuk Rena/For Rena Korean Release on Beatball Records |
| Moka Only | "And I Love Her" | 2008 | Clap Trap |
| Brian Molko | "Across the Universe" | 2010 | |
| Taylor Momsen | "All You Need Is Love" | 2010 | John Lennon Bus Live |
| MonaLisa Twins | "Revolution" | 2014 | Play Beatles & More |
| MonaLisa Twins | "This Boy" | 2014 | Play Beatles & More |
| MonaLisa Twins | "In My Life" | 2014 | Play Beatles & More |
| MonaLisa Twins | "Blackbird" | 2014 | Play Beatles & More |
| MonaLisa Twins | "Drive My Car" | 2014 | Play Beatles & More |
| MonaLisa Twins | "Can't Buy Me Love" | 2014 | Play Beatles & More |
| MonaLisa Twins | "While My Guitar Gently Weeps" | 2014 | Play Beatles & More |
| MonaLisa Twins | "Day Tripper" | 2014 | Play Beatles & More |
| MonaLisa Twins | "I'll Follow the Sun" | 2018 | Play Beatles & More Vol. 2 |
| MonaLisa Twins | "Please Please Me" | 2018 | Play Beatles & More Vol. 2 |
| MonaLisa Twins | "I Saw Her Standing There" | 2018 | Play Beatles & More Vol. 2 |
| MonaLisa Twins | "Maxwell's Silver Hammer" | 2018 | Play Beatles & More Vol. 2 |
| MonaLisa Twins | "When I'm Sixty-Four" | 2018 | Play Beatles & More Vol. 2 |
| MonaLisa Twins | "Two of Us" | 2018 | Play Beatles & More Vol. 2 |
| MonaLisa Twins | "I'll Be Back" | 2018 | Play Beatles & More Vol. 2 |
| MonaLisa Twins | "If I Fell" | 2018 | Play Beatles & More Vol. 3 |
| MonaLisa Twins | "The Night Before" | 2018 | Play Beatles & More Vol. 3 |
| MonaLisa Twins | "You're Going to Lose That Girl" | 2018 | Play Beatles & More Vol. 3 |
| MonaLisa Twins | "Glass Onion" | 2018 | Play Beatles & More Vol. 3 |
| MonaLisa Twins | "Hey Bulldog" | 2018 | Play Beatles & More Vol. 3 |
| MonaLisa Twins | "Yesterday" | 2018 | Play Beatles & More Vol. 3 |
| Eddie Money | "She Came In Through The Bathroom Window" | 2009 | The Covers EP Volume One |
| Eddie Money | "Ticket To Ride" | 2009 | The Covers EP Volume Two |
| Matt Monro | "Yesterday" | 1965 | Hits of Yesterday |
| Matt Monro | "Michelle" | 1973 | Complete Emi Recordings 1971–1984 |
| Monsoon | "Tomorrow Never Knows" | 1983 | Third Eye |
| Wes Montgomery | "A Day in the Life" | 1967 | A Day in the Life |
| Wes Montgomery | "Eleanor Rigby" | 1967 | A Day in the Life |
| Keith Moon | "In My Life" | 1975 | Two Sides of the Moon |
| Keith Moon | "When I'm Sixty-Four" | 1976 | All This and World War II (Soundtrack) |
| R. Stevie Moore | "Getting Better" | 1988 | ...warning: r. stevie moore... |
| R. Stevie Moore | "I'm Only Sleeping" | 1988 | ...warning: r. stevie moore... |
| R. Stevie Moore | "And Your Bird Can Sing" | 1988 | ...warning: r. stevie moore... |
| R. Stevie Moore | "Eleanor Rigby" | 1975 | Reforms the Beatles (instrumentals) |
| R. Stevie Moore | "Here, There and Everywhere" | 1975 | Reforms the Beatles (instrumentals) |
| R. Stevie Moore | "Help!" | 1975 | Reforms the Beatles (instrumentals) |
| R. Stevie Moore | "I'm Happy Just to Dance with You" | 1975 | Reforms the Beatles (instrumentals) |
| R. Stevie Moore | "She Said She Said" | 1975 | Reforms the Beatles (instrumentals) |
| R. Stevie Moore | "Within You Without You" | 1975 | Reforms the Beatles (instrumentals) |
| Jim Moray | "Drive My Car" | 2006 | Rubber Folk |
| Lee Morgan | "Yesterday" | 1965 | Blue Beat: Blue Note Plays the Music of Lennon and McCartney |
| Alanis Morissette | "Happiness Is a Warm Gun" | | |
| Alanis Morissette | "Dear Prudence" | 2001 | Come Together: A Night for John Lennon's Words and Music |
| Alanis Morissette | "Norwegian Wood (This Bird Has Flown)" | | |
| Chisato Moritaka | "Everybody's Got Something to Hide Except Me and My Monkey" | 1994 | Step by Step |
| Chisato Moritaka | "Here Comes the Sun" | 1996 | Taiyo |
| Alison Mosshart and Carla Azar | "Tomorrow Never Knows" | 2011 | Sucker Punch-Original Motion Picture Soundtrack |
| Mötley Crüe | "Helter Skelter" | 1983 | Shout at the Devil |
| Mötley Crüe | "Paperback Writer" | 1981 | Live performance |
| Nana Mouskouri | "Let It Be" | 1973 | Presenting Nana Mouskouri ...Songs From Her TV Series |
| Nana Mouskouri | "Yesterday" | 1989 | The Magic Of Nana Mouskouri |
| Moving Sidewalks | "I Want to Hold Your Hand" | 1968 | Flash |
| Jason Mraz | "In My Life" | 2009 | Live performance |
| Maria Muldaur and Chris Duarte | "Ob-La-Di Ob-La-Da" | 2006 | The Blues White Album |
| Megan Mullally and Supreme Music Program | "Bathroom Window" | | Big as a Berry |
| Gerry Mulligan | "Can't Buy Me Love" | 2010 | Beatles Vs. Stones |
| The Muppets | "All Together Now" | 1994 | Kermit Unpigged |
| The Muppets | "Octopus's Garden" | 1976 | Single ( B- Side ) |
| The Muppets | "While My Guitar Gently Weeps" | 1979 | " Jim Henson's Muppet Show Music Album " |
| The Muppets | "Blackbird" | | (Floyd Pepper, Janice) |
| Anne Murray | "You Won't See Me" | 1974 | Love Song |
| Anne Murray | "Day Tripper" | 1974 | Highly Prized Possession |
| Anne Murray | "I'm Happy Just to Dance with You" | 1980 | Somebody's Waiting |
| Anne Murray | "Let It Be" | 1999 | What a Wonderful World |
| Charlie Musselwhite and Colin Linden | "Dear Prudence" | 2006 | The Blues White Album |
| MxPx | "I Saw Her Standing There" | | (titled "17" on the 7" vinyl disc) |
| Nação Zumbi | "Tomorrow Never Knows" | 2017 | Radiola NZ Vol. 1 |
| Nada Surf | "All You Need Is Love" | 2006 | " Chase " Credit Card Commercial |
| Youssou N'Dour | "Ob-La-Di, Ob-La-Da" | 2004 | 7 Seconds : The Best Of Youssou N'Dour |
| Kenny Neal, Lucky Peterson and Tab Benoit | "Revolution" | 2002 | The Blues White Album |
| Ricky Nelson | "One After 909" | | |
| Willie Nelson | "Yesterday" | 2014 | The Art of McCartney |
| Willie Nelson | "One After 909" | 1995 | Come Together: America Salutes The Beatles |
| Nevershoutnever! | "I Want to Hold Your Hand" | | |
| Nevershoutnever! | "Hey Jude" | | |
| Nevershoutnever! | "Yesterday" | | |
| The New Seekers | "Yesterday" | 1996 | A Tribute To The Beatles |
| The New Seekers | "Ticket to Ride" | 1972 | We'd Like to Teach the World to Sing Part of a medley with "Georgy Girl" |
| Tom Newman | "She Said She Said" | 1975 | Fine Old Tom |
| Olivia Newton-John | "The Long and Winding Road" | 1976 | Come On Over |
| Tito Nieves and Tito Puente | "Let It Be" | 1996 | Tropical Tribute to the Beatles |
| Night Ranger | "Tomorrow Never Knows" (medley with Peter Frampton's "Do You Feel Like We Do") | 1995 | Feeding off the Mojo |
| Ninja Sex Party | "Hey Jude" | 2022 | Live performances |
| Harry Nilsson | "You Can't Do That" | 1967 | Pandemonium Shadow Show |
| Harry Nilsson | "She's Leaving Home" | 1967 | Pandemonium Shadow Show |
| Harry Nilsson | "Mother Nature's Son" | 1969 | Harry |
| Nirvana | "All You Need Is Love" | 1990 | Performed small part between songs in live performance |
| Nirvana | "If I Fell" | | Live performances |
| Nirvana | "I Want to Hold Your Hand" | 1990 | Performed small part between songs in live performance |
| Nirvana | "I Feel Fine" | 1991 | Performed small part between songs in live performance |
| The Nits | "Norwegian Wood (This Bird Has Flown)" | 1995 | Bonus CD with " Broken Wing " Single |
| No Doubt | "Hello Goodbye" | 2010 | Live at Kennedy Center Honors |
| No Doubt | "Ob-La-Di, Ob-La-Da" | 2003 | Boom Box |
| No Doubt | "Penny Lane" | 2010 | Live at Kennedy Center Honors |
| Emmerson Nogueira | "A Hard Day's Night" | 2004 | Emmerson Nogueira – Beatles |
| Emmerson Nogueira | "You've Got to Hide Your Love Away" | 2004 | Emmerson Nogueira – Beatles |
| Emmerson Nogueira | "Mother Nature's Son" | 2004 | Emmerson Nogueira – Beatles |
| Emmerson Nogueira | "With a Little Help from My Friends" | 2004 | Emmerson Nogueira – Beatles |
| Emmerson Nogueira | "Nowhere Man" | 2004 | Emmerson Nogueira – Beatles |
| Emmerson Nogueira | "Blackbird" | 2004 | Emmerson Nogueira – Beatles |
| Emmerson Nogueira | "I've Just Seen a Face" | 2004 | Emmerson Nogueira – Beatles |
| Emmerson Nogueira | "Golden Slumbers" | 2004 | Emmerson Nogueira – Beatles |
| Emmerson Nogueira | "Love Me Do" | 2004 | Emmerson Nogueira – Beatles |
| Emmerson Nogueira | "We Can Work It Out" | 2004 | Emmerson Nogueira – Beatles |
| Emmerson Nogueira | "Norwegian Wood (This Bird Has Flown)" | 2004 | Emmerson Nogueira – Beatles |
| Emmerson Nogueira | "Across the Universe" | 2004 | Emmerson Nogueira – Beatles |
| Emmerson Nogueira | "From Me to You" | 2004 | Emmerson Nogueira – Beatles |
| Emmerson Nogueira | "Help!" | 2004 | Emmerson Nogueira – Beatles |
| Noir Désir | "I Want You (She's So Heavy)" | 1994 | Dies Irae (live) |
| Noir Désir | "Helter Skelter" | 1994 | Soyons Désinvoltes N’ayons l’Air de Rien |
| Heather Nova | "We Can Work It Out" | 2002 | I Am Sam soundtrack |
| Ted Nugent | "I Want to Tell You" | 1979 | State of Shock |
| Adam Nussbaum | "Yesterday" | 1993 | Guitar Tribute To The Beatles |
| The Nylons | "This Boy" | 1984 | Seamless |
| Sinéad O'Connor | "Eleanor Rigby" | 1994 | Verse quoted in the song "Famine" from Universal Mother |
| Oasis | "I Am the Walrus" | 1994 | "Cigarettes & Alcohol" single |
| Oasis | "You've Got to Hide Your Love Away" | 1995 | "Some Might Say" Japanese single |
| Oasis | "Tomorrow Never Knows" | 2000 | Instrumental intro to "Cigarettes & Alcohol" on Familiar to Millions |
| Oasis | "Helter Skelter" | 2000 | "Who Feels Love?" single |
| Oasis | "Within You Without You" | 2007 | Sgt. Pepper's Lonely Hearts Club Band – 40th Anniversary BBC Broadcast |
| Oasis | "Octopus's Garden" | 1995 | Included in part of "The Masterplan" |
| Oasis | "Strawberry Fields Forever" | 2006 | Live performances on "Stop the Clocks" tour |
| Billy Ocean | "The Long and Winding Road" | 1984 | Suddenly |
| Ocean Colour Scene | "Day Tripper" | 1996 | "The Circle" single (with Liam Gallagher & Noel Gallagher) |
| Tom Odell | "Real Love" | 2014 | Spending All My Christmas With You |
| Odetta | "Strawberry Fields Forever" | 1967 | Odetta |
| of Montreal | "I'm So Tired | | |
| of Montreal | "I Will" | | |
| Oingo Boingo | "I Am the Walrus" | 1994 | Boingo |
| The O'Jays | "Something" | 1970 | In Philadelphia |
| OK Go | "Any Time At All" | 2012 | Twelve Days of OK Go |
| Ollabelle | "Get Back" | 2013 | Let Us In Americana: The Music of Paul McCartney |
| Omar | "She's a Woman" | 1990 | Monkey Land |
| One Direction | "All You Need is Love" | 2010 | X Factor UK performance |
| Anders Osborne | "Happiness Is a Warm Gun" | 2002 | The Blues White Album |
| Joan Osborne | "Lady Madonna" | 1991 | Soul Show: Live at Delta 88 |
| Ozzy Osbourne | "In My Life" | 2005 | Under Cover |
| Our Lady Peace | "Tomorrow Never Knows" | 1996 | The Craft soundtrack |
| Outside Royalty | "Eleanor Rigby" | 2009 | B-side to "Lightbulb (Turning Off)" |
| The Overlanders | "Michelle" | 1966 | single |
| Amanda Overmyer | "You Can't Do That" | 2008 | American Idol performance |
| Amanda Overmyer | "Back In the U.S.S.R." | 2008 | American Idol performance |
| P.M. Dawn | "Norwegian Wood (This Bird Has Flown)" | 1993 | The Bliss Album…? (Vibrations of Love and Anger and the Ponderance of Life and Existence) |
| Pain | "Eleanor Rigby" | 2002 | Nothing Remains the Same |
| Robert Palmer | "Not a Second Time" | 1980 | Clues |
| Robert Palmer | "You Won't See Me" | | |
| Panic! at the Disco | "Eleanor Rigby" | | live performance |
| Junior Parker | "Taxman" | 1970 | The Outside Man |
| Junior Parker | "Tomorrow Never Knows" | 2006 | Children of Men soundtrack |
| Doug Parkinson | "Dear Prudence" | 1969 | Doug Parkinson in Focus |
| Dolly Parton | "Help!" | 1979 | Great Balls of Fire |
| Jaco Pastorius | "Blackbird" | 1981 | Word of Mouth |
| Himesh Patel | "Yesterday" | 2019 | Yesterday: Original Motion Picture Soundtrack |
| Himesh Patel | "I Saw Her Standing There" | 2019 | Yesterday: Original Motion Picture Soundtrack |
| Himesh Patel | "Let It Be" | 2019 | Yesterday: Original Motion Picture Soundtrack |
| Himesh Patel | "Something" | 2019 | Yesterday: Original Motion Picture Soundtrack |
| Himesh Patel | "Carry That Weight" | 2019 | Yesterday: Original Motion Picture Soundtrack |
| Himesh Patel | "The Long And Winding Road" | 2019 | Yesterday: Original Motion Picture Soundtrack |
| Himesh Patel | "Help!" | 2019 | Yesterday: Original Motion Picture Soundtrack |
| Himesh Patel | "She Loves You" | 2019 | Yesterday: Original Motion Picture Soundtrack |
| Himesh Patel | "A Hard Day's Night" | 2019 | Yesterday: Original Motion Picture Soundtrack |
| Himesh Patel | "I Want To Hold Your Hand" | 2019 | Yesterday: Original Motion Picture Soundtrack |
| Himesh Patel | "Back In The USSR" | 2019 | Yesterday: Original Motion Picture Soundtrack |
| Himesh Patel | "All You Need Is Love" | 2019 | Yesterday: Original Motion Picture Soundtrack |
| Himesh Patel | "Hey Jude" | 2019 | Yesterday: Original Motion Picture Soundtrack |
| Himesh Patel | "Ob-La-Di, Ob-La-Da" | 2019 | Yesterday: Original Motion Picture Soundtrack |
| Pearl Jam | "I've Got a Feeling" | 1991 | Ten Japanese bonus track |
| Pearl Jam | "You've Got to Hide Your Love Away" | 2003 | live performances |
| Pearl Jam | "Don't Let Me Down" | | |
| Pearl Jam | "I've Just Seen a Face" | 1995 | live on Vitalogy Tour |
| Pearl Jam | "Eleanor Rigby" | 2005 | North American and Latin American Tour |
| Marti Pellow | "Don't Let Me Down" | 2003 | Between the Covers |
| Miles Pena | "With a Little Help from My Friends" | 1996 | Tropical Tribute to the Beatles |
| Joe Perry | "Sgt. Pepper's Lonely Hearts Club Band" | 2006 | American Idol Finale |
| Pert Near Sandstone | "I Am the Walrus" | 2010 | Minnesota Beatles Project, Vol. 2 |
| Bernadette Peters | "Blackbird" | 1996 | I'll Be Your Baby Tonight |
| Peters and Lee | "If I Fell" | 1975 | Favourites |
| Lucky Peterson | "Yer Blues" | 2002 | The Blues White Album |
| Oscar Peterson | "Yesterday" | 2010 | Beatles Vs. Stones |
| Tom Petty and the Heartbreakers | "Taxman" | 2002 | Concert for George |
| Tom Petty and the Heartbreakers | "I Need You" | 2002 | Concert for George |
| Tom Petty and the Heartbreakers, Jeff Lynne and Prince | "While My Guitar Gently Weeps" | 2004 | Rock and Roll Hall of Fame ceremony |
| Madeleine Peyroux | "Martha My Dear" | 2011 | Standing on the Rooftop |
| Esther Phillips | "And I Love Her" as "And I Love Him" | 1965 | And I Love Him! |
| Phish | "Back In the U.S.S.R." | 1994 | Live Phish Volume 13 |
| Phish | "Dear Prudence" | 1994 | Live Phish Volume 13 |
| Phish | "Glass Onion" | 1994 | Live Phish Volume 13 |
| Phish | "Ob-La-Di, Ob-La-Da" | 1994 | Live Phish Volume 13 |
| Phish | "Wild Honey Pie" | 1994 | Live Phish Volume 13 |
| Phish | "The Continuing Story of Bungalow Bill" | 1994 | Live Phish Volume 13 |
| Phish | "While My Guitar Gently Weeps" | 1994 | Live Phish Volume 13 |
| Phish | "Happiness Is a Warm Gun" | 1994 | Live Phish Volume 13 |
| Phish | "Martha My Dear" | 1994 | Live Phish Volume 13 |
| Phish | "I'm So Tired" | 1994 | Live Phish Volume 13 |
| Phish | "Blackbird" | 1994 | Live Phish Volume 13 |
| Phish | "Piggies" | 1994 | Live Phish Volume 13 |
| Phish | "Rocky Raccoon" | 1994 | Live Phish Volume 13 |
| Phish | "Don't Pass Me By" | 1994 | Live Phish Volume 13 |
| Phish | "Why Don't We Do It in the Road?" | 1994 | Live Phish Volume 13 |
| Phish | "I Will" | 1994 | Live Phish Volume 13 |
| Phish | "Julia" | 1994 | Live Phish Volume 13 |
| Phish | "Birthday" | 1994 | Live Phish Volume 13 |
| Phish | "Yer Blues" | 1994 | Live Phish Volume 13 |
| Phish | "Mother Nature's Son" | 1994 | Live Phish Volume 13 |
| Phish | "Everybody's Got Something to Hide Except Me and My Monkey" | 1994 | Live Phish Volume 13 |
| Phish | "Sexy Sadie" | 1994 | Live Phish Volume 13 |
| Phish | "Helter Skelter" | 1994 | Live Phish Volume 13 |
| Phish | "Long, Long, Long" | 1994 | Live Phish Volume 13 |
| Phish | "Revolution 1" | 1994 | Live Phish Volume 13 |
| Phish | "Honey Pie" | 1994 | Live Phish Volume 13 |
| Phish | "Savoy Truffle" | 1994 | Live Phish Volume 13 |
| Phish | "Cry Baby Cry" | 1994 | Live Phish Volume 13 |
| Phish | "Revolution 9" | 1994 | Live Phish Volume 13 |
| Phish | "A Day in the Life" | 1995 | Live Phish Volume 14 |
| Phoenix | "Lady Madonna" | 1968 | Vremuri |
| Wilson Pickett | "Hey Jude" | 1969 | Hey Jude |
| Courtney Pine Quartet | "When I'm Sixty-Four" | 1988 | Sgt. Pepper Knew My Father |
| Pink | "Lucy in the Sky with Diamonds" | 2016 | The Beat Bugs: Complete Season 1 |
| Pink Fairies | "I Saw Her Standing There" | 1972 | What a Bunch of Sweeties |
| Pink Fairies | "Tomorrow Never Knows" | 1998 | The Golden Years: 1969–1971 |
| Pink Lady | Medley: "Hey Jude", "Get Back", "Back in the U.S.S.R.", "I Want to Hold Your Hand", "Lady Madonna", "Help!", "Yesterday", "Yellow Submarine", "Ob-La-Di, Ob-La-Da", "Lucy in the Sky with Diamonds", "Michelle", "With a Little Help from My Friends", "All My Loving", "Penny Lane" | 1978 | '78 Jumping Summer Carnival |
| Bonnie Pink | "Blackbird" | 1998 | In My Life |
| Pixies | "Wild Honey Pie" | 1998 | Pixies at the BBC |
| The Plague | "Come Together" | 2005 | The X Tapes |
| Plain White T's | "We Can Work It Out" | 2007 | Every Second Counts |
| Robert Plant | "Back In the U.S.S.R." | | (live) |
| Polyrock | "Rain" | 1981 | Changing Hearts |
| David Porter | "Help!" | 1971 | Victim of the Joke? An Opera |
| Power Station | "Taxman" | 1996 | Living in Fear |
| Pozo-Seco Singers | "You've Got to Hide Your Love Away" | 1968 | Shades of Time |
| Pozo-Seco Singers | "Strawberry Fields Forever/"Something" medley | 1970 | Spend Some Time With Me |
| The Presidents of the United States of America | "Baby, You're a Rich Man" | | live performance |
| Elvis Presley | "Yesterday" | 1970 | On Stage |
| Elvis Presley | "Hey Jude" | 1972 | Elvis Now |
| Elvis Presley | "Something" | 1973 | Aloha from Hawaii: Via Satellite |
| Elvis Presley | "Get Back" | 2000 | That's the Way It Is special edition |
| Elvis Presley | "Lady Madonna" | 1995 | Walk a Mile in My Shoes: The Essential 70's Masters |
| Billy Preston | "Blackbird" | 1972 | Music Is My Life |
| Billy Preston | "A Hard Day's Night" | 1966 | Wildest Organ in Town! |
| Billy Preston | "I've Got a Feeling" | 1970 | Encouraging Words |
| Billy Preston | "Day Tripper" | 1971 | Live European Tour |
| Billy Preston | "Let It Be" | 1971 | Live European Tour |
| Billy Preston | "Here, There and Everywhere" | 1984 | On the Air |
| Billy Preston | "Eight Days a Week" | 1965 | Early Hits of 1965 |
| Billy Preston | "Get Back" | 1978 | Sgt. Pepper's Lonely Hearts Club Band soundtrack |
| Prince Buster | "All My Loving" | 1968 | "Try A Little Tenderness" Single ( B-Side / Test pressing ) |
| Disney Princesses (featuring Queen Minnie Mouse, Alice, Anna, Elsa, Moana, and Vanellope Von Schweetz) | "Let It Be" | TBA | TBA |
| Disney Princesses (featuring Queen Minnie Mouse, Alice, Anna, Elsa, Moana, and Vanellope Von Schweetz) | "Help!" | TBA | TBA |
| Procol Harum | "Eight Days a Week" | 1975 | Procol's Ninth |
| Gary Puckett | "Lady Madonna" | 1968 | Gary Puckett and the Union Gap |
| Marlisa Punzalan | "Help!" | 2014 | The X Factor Australia |
| Marlisa Punzalan | "Yesterday" | 2014 | The X Factor Australia |
| Josh Pyke | "Blackbird" | 2024 | Covers |
| Suzi Quatro | "I Wanna Be Your Man" | 1973 | Suzi Quatro |
| Queen | "I Feel Fine" | 1986 | played guitar riff in Magic Tour concert |
| Domingo Quinones | "Day Tripper" | 1996 | Tropical Tribute to the Beatles |
| R.E.M. | "Christmas Time (Is Here Again)" | 2000 | R.E.M. Holiday Single 2000 |
| The Radiators | "Revolution" | 1984 | Life's a Gamble |
| Corinne Bailey Rae | "Golden Slumbers" | 2006 | 2006 UK Hall Of Fame Ceremony |
| Corinne Bailey Rae | "Carry That Weight" | 2006 | 2006 UK Hall Of Fame Ceremony |
| Corinne Bailey Rae | "The End" | 2006 | 2006 UK Hall Of Fame Ceremony |
| Corinne Bailey Rae | "Blackbird" | 2010 | Live with Herbie Hancock at the Gershwin Prize Ceremony at the White House |
| Rajaton | "Eleanor Rigby" | 2015 | Rajaton Sings The Beatles With The Lahti Symphony Orchestra |
| Zé Ramalho | "The Fool on the Hill" as "O Tolo na Colina (The Full on the hill)" | 1984 | Por Aquelas que Foram Bem Amadas |
| Zé Ramalho | "This Boy" as "Ser Boy (To Be Boy)" | 1987 | Décimas de um Cantador |
| Zé Ramalho | "Lucy in the Sky with Diamonds" as "Você ainda pode sonhar (You Still Can Dream)" | 2001 | Zé Ramalho canta Raul Seixas |
| Marky Ramone and the Intruders | "Nowhere Man" | 1999 | The Answer to Your Problems? |
| Rancid | "Ob-La-Di, Ob-La-Da" | | |
| Peter Randall and the Raindogs | "I'll Be Back" | 1994 | Peter Randall and the Raindogs |
| Nelson Rangell | "Let It Be" | 1995 | (I Got No Kick Against) Modern Jazz |
| Kenny Rankin | "Blackbird" | 1974 | Silver Morning |
| Kenny Rankin | "Penny Lane" | 1974 | Silver Morning |
| Kenny Rankin | "While My Guitar Gently Weeps" | 1977 | The Kenny Rankin Album |
| Rare Earth | "Eleanor Rigby" | 1970 | Ecology |
| Rascal Flatts | "Revolution" | 2007 | Still Feels Good Japan bonus track |
| Collin Raye | "Let It Be" | 1995 | Come Together: America Salutes The Beatles |
| Razorlight | "With a Little Help from My Friends" | 2007 | It Was 40 Years Ago Today |
| The Real Group | "Drive My Car" | 1989 | Nothing but The Real Group |
| The Real Group | "Strawberry Fields Forever" | 1996 | Jazz: Live |
| Reckless Kelly | "Revolution" | 2006 | Reckless Kelly Was Here |
| Red Hot Chili Peppers | "Dig a Pony" | 2002 | Live performances on the By the Way tour |
| Red Hot Chili Peppers | "I've Just Seen A Face" | 2003 | Live performance on the By the Way tour |
| Red Hot Chili Peppers | "Birthday" | 2011 | Live performance on the I'm with You Tour |
| Redd Kross | "It Won't Be Long" | 1994 | "Visionary" b-side |
| Otis Redding | "Day Tripper" | 1966 | Complete & Unbelievable: The Otis Redding Dictionary of Soul |
| Otis Redding | "A Hard Day's Night" | 1993 | Good to Me: Live at the Whisky a Go Go, Vol. 2 |
| Helen Reddy | "The Fool on the Hill" | 1976 | All This and World War II (Soundtrack) |
| Helen Reddy | "One After 909" | 1978 | We'll Sing In The Sunshine |
| The Redwalls | "One After 909" | | |
| Eric Reed | "Yesterday" | 2014 | The Beatles: A Jazz Tribute, Celebrating 50 Years |
| Elis Regina | "Golden Slumbers" | 1971 | Ela |
| Jim Reid | "And Your Bird Can Sing" | | Mojo magazine compilation |
| The Residents | "Revolution 9" | 1976 | The Third Reich 'n Roll |
| The Residents | "Hey Jude" | 1976 | The Third Reich 'n Roll |
| The Residents | "Being for the Benefit of Mr. Kite!" | | Live performance 40th Anniversary celebration of Sgt. Pepper with the London Sinfonietta |
| The Residents | "Beyond the Valley of a Day in the Life" (collage of Beatles recordings) | 1977 | "The Beatles Play The Residents and The Residents Play The Beatles" single |
| The Residents | "Flying" | 1977 | B-side to "The Beatles Play The Residents and The Residents Play The Beatles" single |
| Restless Heart | "The Night Before" | 2004 | Still Restless |
| Buddy Rich Big Band | "Something" | 1972 | Stick It |
| Buddy Rich Big Band | "Norwegian Wood" | 1967 | Big Swing Face |
| Cliff Richard | "And I Love Her" | 2001 | Wanted |
| Cliff Richard | "Things We Said Today" | 1966 | LA LA LA LA LA (EP) |
| Cliff Richard | "I'll Be Back" | 1967 | Don't Stop Me Now! |
| Cliff Richard | "I Saw Her Standing There" | 1967 | Don't Stop Me Now! |
| Joshua Rifkin | "I Want to Hold Your Hand" | 1965 | The Baroque Beatles Book |
| Joshua Rifkin | "You're Gonna Lose That Girl" | 1965 | The Baroque Beatles Book |
| Joshua Rifkin | "I'll Cry Instead" | 1965 | The Baroque Beatles Book |
| Joshua Rifkin | "Things We Said Today" | 1965 | The Baroque Beatles Book |
| Joshua Rifkin | "You've Got to Hide Your Love Away" | 1965 | The Baroque Beatles Book |
| Joshua Rifkin | "Hold Me Tight" | 1965 | The Baroque Beatles Book |
| Joshua Rifkin | "Please Please Me" | 1965 | The Baroque Beatles Book |
| Joshua Rifkin | "Help!" | 1965 | The Baroque Beatles Book |
| Joshua Rifkin | "I'll Be Back" | 1965 | The Baroque Beatles Book |
| Joshua Rifkin | "Eight Days a Week" | 1965 | The Baroque Beatles Book |
| Joshua Rifkin | "She Loves You" | 1965 | The Baroque Beatles Book |
| Joshua Rifkin | "Thank You Girl" | 1965 | The Baroque Beatles Book |
| Joshua Rifkin | "A Hard Day's Night" | 1965 | The Baroque Beatles Book |
| Stevie Riks | "With a Little Help from My Friends" | | |
| Stevie Riks | "All Together Now" | | |
| Stevie Riks | "Nowhere Man" | | |
| Stevie Riks | "Yesterday" | | |
| Stevie Riks | "I Want To Hold Your Hand" | | |
| Stevie Riks | "Two of Us" | | |
| Stevie Riks | "I Saw Her Standing There" | | |
| Stevie Riks | "Across the Universe" | | |
| Stevie Riks | "A Day in the Life" | | |
| Stevie Riks | "In My Life" | | |
| Stevie Riks | "Hey Bulldog" | | |
| Stevie Riks | "From Me To You" | | |
| Stevie Riks | "Hello, Goodbye" | | |
| Stevie Riks | "The Long and Winding Road" | | |
| Stevie Riks | "Baby, You're a Rich Man" | | |
| Stevie Riks | "I'll Get You" | | |
| Stevie Riks | White Album Medley | | |
| Stevie Riks | Abbey Road Medley | | |
| LeAnn Rimes | "Yesterday" | 1994 | All That |
| Joe Ritchie | "Got to Get You Into My Life" | 1968 | Little Joe Sure Can Sing! |
| Joe Ritchie | "The Fool on the Hill" | 1968 | Little Joe Sure Can Sing! |
| Joe Ritchie | "Fixing a Hole" | 1968 | Little Joe Sure Can Sing! |
| Lee Ritenour | "A Day in the Life" | 1995 | (I Got No Kick Against) Modern Jazz |
| Johnny Rivera | "A Hard Day's Night" | 1996 | Tropical Tribute to the Beatles |
| Smokey Robinson and the Miracles | "Something" | 1970 | A Pocket Full of Miracles |
| Smokey Robinson and the Miracles | "Hey Jude" | 1969 | Four in Blue |
| Lourdes Robles | "The Long and Winding Road" (El Largo Caminar) | 1995 | Hey Jude (Tributo A Los Beatles) |
| Rockwell | "Taxman" | 1984 | Somebody's Watching Me |
| Johnny Rodriguez | "Something" | 1974 | My Third Album |
| Kenny Rogers and the First Edition | "The Long and Winding Road" | 1973 | Rollin |
| The Rolling Stones | "I Wanna Be Your Man" | 1963 | Milestones |
| Rooney | "Helter Skelter" | | Live performance |
| Rootjoose | "Taxman" | 1997 | Rhubarb |
| The Roots | "Come Together" | 2006 | Sampled on Best of The Roots |
| Axl Rose & Bruce Springsteen | "Come Together" | 1994 | Rock n' Roll Hall of Fame ceremony |
| Rosenberg Trio | "Help!" | 1992 | Impressions |
| Diana Ross | "Come Together" | 1970 | Everything Is Everything |
| Diana Ross | "The Long and Winding Road" | 1970 | Everything Is Everything |
| Diana Ross | "Something" | 2008 | Everything Is Everything expanded edition |
| Diana Ross | "I Will" | 2006 | I Love You |
| Diana Ross & the Supremes and The Temptations | "Got to Get You into My Life" | 1968 | Joined Together: The Complete Studio Duets |
| Tino Rossi | "Yesterday" | 1978 | Les Plus Belles Chansons du Monde |
| David Lee Roth | "That Beatles Tune" (Tomorrow Never Knows) | 2003 | Diamond Dave |
| Roxette | "Help!" | 2006 | The Rox Box/Roxette 86–06 |
| Rubblebucket | "Michelle" | 2010 | Triangular Daisies |
| Steve Rucker | "A Day in the Life" | 2006 | Best of the Beatles (Classical Interpretations) |
| Steve Rucker | "Day Tripper" | 2006 | Best of the Beatles (Classical Interpretations) |
| Todd Rundgren | "Rain" | 1976 | Faithful |
| Todd Rundgren | "Strawberry Fields Forever" | 1976 | Faithful |
| Todd Rundgren | "While My Guitar Gently Weeps" | 2003 | Songs from the Material World: A Tribute to George Harrison |
| Running Wild | "Revolution" | 2000 | Victory |
| John Rutter | "Yesterday" | 1979 | The Beatles Concerto |
| John Rutter | "She Loves You" | 1979 | The Beatles Concerto |
| John Rutter | "Eleanor Rigby" | 1979 | The Beatles Concerto |
| John Rutter | "All My Loving" | 1979 | The Beatles Concerto |
| John Rutter | "Hey Jude" | 1979 | The Beatles Concerto |
| John Rutter | "Here, There and Everywhere" | 1979 | The Beatles Concerto |
| John Rutter | "Something" | 1979 | The Beatles Concerto |
| John Rutter | "Can't Buy Me Love" | 1979 | The Beatles Concerto |
| John Rutter | "The Long and Winding Road" | 1979 | The Beatles Concerto |
| John Rutter | "The Fool on the Hill" | 1979 | The Beatles Concerto |
| John Rutter | "Lucy in the Sky with Diamonds" | 1979 | The Beatles Concerto |
| John Rutter | "Michelle" | 1979 | The Beatles Concerto |
| John Rutter | "Maxwell's Silver Hammer" | 1979 | The Beatles Concerto |
| John Rutter | "Here Comes the Sun" | 1979 | The Beatles Concerto |
| John Rutter | "A Hard Day's Night" | 1979 | The Beatles Concerto |
| S Club 7 | "The Long and Winding Road" | 2002 | "You (S Club 7 song)" single |
| S Club 7 | "Yesterday" | | |
| S Club 7 | "Hey Jude" | | |
| S Club 7 | "Come Together" | | |
| S Club 7 | "Blackbird" | | |
| Saga | "Taxman" | 1997 | Pleasure & the Pain |
| Sam & Mark | "With a Little Help from My Friends" | 2004 | single |
| Samael | "Helter Skelter" | 2021 | Hegemony |
| David Sanborn | "The Word" | 2021 | Step Inside Love - a Jazzy Tribute to the Beatles |
| Adam Sandler | "Real Love" | 2009 | Funny People soundtrack |
| Arturo Sandoval | "Blackbird" | 1995 | (I Got No Kick Against) Modern Jazz |
| The Sandpipers | "Things We Said Today" | 1966 | Guantanamera |
| The Sandpipers | "Yesterday" | 1967 | The Sandpipers |
| The Sandpipers | "Michelle" | 1967 | The Sandpipers |
| The Sandpipers | "And I Love Her" | 1967 | Misty Roses |
| The Sandpipers | "All My Loving" | 1969 | Softly |
| Santana | "With a Little Help from My Friends" | 1991 | The Big Jams |
| Santo & Johnny | "A Hard Day's Night" | 1964 | The Beatles Greatest Hits Played by Santo & Johnny |
| Santo & Johnny | "Do You Want to Know a Secret?" | 1964 | The Beatles Greatest Hits Played by Santo & Johnny |
| Santo & Johnny | "She Loves You" | 1964 | The Beatles Greatest Hits Played by Santo & Johnny |
| Santo & Johnny | "I Want to Hold Your Hand" | 1964 | The Beatles Greatest Hits Played by Santo & Johnny |
| Santo & Johnny | "I Saw Her Standing There" | 1964 | The Beatles Greatest Hits Played by Santo & Johnny |
| Santo & Johnny | "And I Love Her" | 1964 | The Beatles Greatest Hits Played by Santo & Johnny |
| Santo & Johnny | "All My Loving" | 1964 | The Beatles Greatest Hits Played by Santo & Johnny |
| Santo & Johnny | "P.S. I Love You" | 1964 | The Beatles Greatest Hits Played by Santo & Johnny |
| Santo & Johnny | "Please Please Me" | 1964 | The Beatles Greatest Hits Played by Santo & Johnny |
| Santo & Johnny | "Can't Buy Me Love" | 1964 | The Beatles Greatest Hits Played by Santo & Johnny |
| Telly Savalas | "Something" | 1974 | Telly |
| Say Hi | "I'm So Tired" | 2004 | Numbers & Mumbles |
| Leo Sayer | "I Am the Walrus" | 1976 | All This and World War II (Soundtrack) |
| Leo Sayer | "Let It Be" | 1976 | All This and World War II (Soundtrack) |
| Leo Sayer | "The Long and Winding Road" | 1976 | All This and World War II (Soundtrack) |
| Saxon | "Paperback Writer" | 2021 | Inspirations |
| Wesley Schultz | "Honey Pie" | 2016 | The Beat Bugs: Complete Season 1 |
| Scorpions | "Across the Universe" | 2011 | Comeblack |
| Tom Scott | "The Fool on the Hill" | 1995 | (I Got No Kick Against) Modern Jazz |
| B.B. Seaton & The Gaylads | "Eleanor Rigby" | 1972 | Thin Line Between Love & Hate |
| The Secret Machines | "Blue Jay Way" | 2007 | Across the Universe soundtrack |
| The Secret Machines | "Flying" | 2007 | Across the Universe soundtrack |
| Seether | "Across the Universe" | | iTunes Original album |
| Shigeo Sekito | "Yesterday" | 1975 | Special Sound Series Vol. II |
| Peter Sellers | "A Hard Day's Night" | 1965 | Parlophone single |
| Peter Sellers | "Help!" | 1965 | single ( Parlophone R 5393 ) |
| Peter Sellers | "She Loves You" | 1993 | A Celebration Of Sellers ( 3 Versions ) |
| Peter Sellers | "Can't Buy Me Love" | 1993 | A Hard Day's Night ( UK EP ) |
| Ray Sepulveda | "The Fool on the Hill" | 1996 | Tropical Tribute to the Beatles |
| Camilo Sesto | "Day Tripper" | 1981 | Live at the Viña del Mar International Song Festival |
| Sfinx | "Sgt. Pepper's Lonely Hearts Club Band" | 1968 | Video recording at the Romanian Television |
| The Shadows | "Paperback Writer" | 1970 | Shades Of Rock |
| The Shadows | "Get Back" | 1970 | Shades Of Rock |
| The Shadows | "Something" | 1970 | Shades Of Rock |
| The Shadows | "Hey Jude" | 1986 | Moonlight Shadows |
| The Shadows | "Strawberry Fields Forever" | 1990 | Reflections |
| The Shambles (band) | "I've Just Seen A Face" | 1996 | Clouds All Day |
| The Shambles (band) | "Fixing A Hole" | 2007 | Ansia De Color |
| Shampoo | "Nowhere Man" (N'omm 'e nient) | 1980 | In Naples 1980/81(Italian album) |
| Shampoo | "Please Please Me" (Che guaio si' tu) | 1980 | In Naples 1980/81(Italian album) |
| Shampoo | "From Me To You" (Quaccosa 'e 'cchiù) | 1980 | In Naples 1980/81(Italian album) |
| Shampoo | "She Loves You" (Si 'e llave tu) | 1980 | In Naples 1980/81(Italian album) |
| Shampoo | "No Reply" (So' fesso) | 1980 | In Naples 1980/81(Italian album) |
| Shampoo | "Tell Me Why" (Tengo e' guaie) | 1980 | In Naples 1980/81(Italian album) |
| Shampoo | "Help!" (Peppe) | 1980 | In Naples 1980/81(Italian album) |
| Shampoo | "Because" (Si fosse 'o Re) | 1980 | In Naples 1980/81(Italian album) |
| Shampoo | "A Hard Day's Night" (Si scinne abbascie e' night) | 1980 | In Naples 1980/81(Italian album) |
| Shampoo | "Day Tripper" ('E zizze) | 1980 | In Naples 1980/81(Italian album) |
| Shampoo | "Ob-La-Di, Ob-La-Da" | 1985 | Ob-La-Di, Ob-La-Da (Italian album) |
| Bud Shank | "Michelle" | 1966 | Michelle |
| Bud Shank | "Girl" | 1966 | Michelle |
| Bud Shank | "Yesterday" | 1966 | Michelle |
| Del Shannon | "From Me to You" | 1963 | single |
| William Shatner | "Lucy in the Sky with Diamonds" | 1968 | The Transformed Man |
| Sandie Shaw | "Love Me Do" | 1969 | Reviewing the Situation |
| She & Him | "I Should Have Known Better" | 2008 | Volume One |
| Ed Sheeran | "In My Life" | 2014 | Performed at a tribute concert for The Beatles |
| Shenandoah | "Can't Buy Me Love" | 1995 | Come Together: America Salutes The Beatles |
| Sherbet | "Nowhere Man" | 1978 | single |
| Ringo Shiina | "Yer Blues" | 2002 | Utaite Myōri: Sono Ichi |
| Jake Shimabukuro | "While My Guitar Gently Weeps" | 2006 | Gently Weeps |
| Jake Shimabukuro | "In My Life" | 2007 | My Life |
| Jake Shimabukuro | "Here, There and Everywhere" | 2007 | My Life |
| The Shins | "The Word" | 2016 | The Beat Bugs: Complete Season 1 |
| Michelle Shocked | "Lovely Rita" | 1988 | Sgt. Pepper Knew My Father |
| Shonen Knife | "Rain" | 1991 | 712 |
| Show of Hands | "If I Needed Someone" | 2006 | Witness |
| Sia | "Blackbird" | 2016 | The Beat Bugs: Complete Season 1 |
| Frank Sidebottom | "Being for the Benefit of Mr. Kite!" | 1988 | Sgt. Pepper Knew My Father |
| The Silkie | "You've Got to Hide Your Love Away" | 1965 | single |
| Silverstein | "Help!" | 2009 | A Shipwreck in the Sand |
| Norman Simmons | "Eleanor Rigby" | 2014 | The Beatles: A Jazz Tribute, Celebrating 50 Years |
| Nina Simone | "The Long and Winding Road" | 1993 | A Single Woman |
| Nina Simone | "Here Comes the Sun" | 1971 | Here Comes the Sun |
| Nina Simone | "Here Comes the Sun (Francois K. Remix)" | 2006 | Remixed and Reimagined |
| Martin Simpson | "I'm Looking Through You" | 2006 | Rubber Folk |
| Valerie Simpson | "We Can Work It Out" | 1971 | Exposed |
| Frank Sinatra | "Something" | 1972 | Frank Sinatra's Greatest Hits, Vol. 2, rerecorded on Trilogy: Past Present Future |
| Nancy Sinatra | "Day Tripper" | 1966 | Boots |
| Nancy Sinatra | "Run for Your Life" | 1966 | Boots |
| The Singers Unlimited | "Michelle" | 1971 | A Capella |
| Siouxsie and the Banshees | "Blue Jay Way" | 2003 | The Seven Year Itch |
| Siouxsie and the Banshees | "Dear Prudence" | 1983 | single |
| Siouxsie and the Banshees | "Helter Skelter" | 1978 | The Scream |
| The Skatalites | "This Boy" | 1997 | Foundation Ska |
| Bria Skonberg | "Julia" | 2014 | Introducing Bria Skonberg |
| The Slackers | "We Can Work It Out" | 2009 | Lost & Found |
| Slade | "Getting Better" | 1972 | Live at the BBC |
| Slade | "Martha My Dear" | 1969 | Beginnings |
| Slaughter | "Revolution" | | covered live acoustically |
| Smash Mouth | "Getting Better" | 2003 | The Cat in the Hat soundtrack |
| Elliott Smith | "Blackbird" | | |
| Elliott Smith | "Because" | 1999 | American Beauty soundtrack |
| Elliott Smith | "I Me Mine" | | |
| Elliott Smith | "Long, Long, Long" | | |
| Elliott Smith | "Something" | | |
| Elliott Smith | "Yer Blues" | | |
| Elliott Smith | "For No One" | | |
| Elliott Smith | "I'm So Tired" | | |
| Kate Smith | "Beatles Medley" | | |
| Lonnie Smith | "Eleanor Rigby" | 1969 | Blue Beat: Blue Note Plays the Music of Lennon and McCartney |
| Mindy Smith | "The Word" | 2005 | This Bird Has Flown – A 40th Anniversary Tribute to the Beatles' Rubber Soul |
| Patti Smith | "Within You Without You" | 2007 | Twelve |
| The Smithereens | "I Want to Hold Your Hand" | 2007 | Meet The Smithereens! |
| The Smithereens | "I Saw Her Standing There" | 2007 | Meet The Smithereens! |
| The Smithereens | "This Boy" | 2007 | Meet The Smithereens! |
| The Smithereens | "It Won't Be Long" | 2007 | Meet The Smithereens! |
| The Smithereens | "All I've Got to Do" | 2007 | Meet The Smithereens! |
| The Smithereens | "All My Loving" | 2007 | Meet The Smithereens! |
| The Smithereens | "Don't Bother Me" | 2007 | Meet The Smithereens! |
| The Smithereens | "Little Child" | 2007 | Meet The Smithereens! |
| The Smithereens | "Hold Me Tight" | 2007 | Meet The Smithereens! |
| The Smithereens | "I Wanna Be Your Man" | 2007 | Meet The Smithereens! |
| The Smithereens | "Not a Second Time" | 2007 | Meet The Smithereens! |
| The Smithereens | "One After 909" | 2014 | Covers |
| The Smithereens | "I Want to Tell You" | 2005 | God Save The Smithereens Deluxe edition |
| The Smithereens | "Thank You Girl" | 2008 | B-Sides The Beatles |
| The Smithereens | "There's a Place" | 2008 | B-Sides The Beatles |
| The Smithereens | "I'll Get You" | 2008 | B-Sides The Beatles |
| The Smithereens | "You Can't Do That" | 2008 | B-Sides The Beatles |
| The Smithereens | "Ask Me Why" | 2008 | B-Sides The Beatles |
| The Smithereens | "Cry for a Shadow" | 2008 | B-Sides The Beatles |
| The Smithereens | "P.S. I Love You" | 2008 | B-Sides The Beatles |
| The Smithereens | "I'm Happy Just to Dance with You" | 2008 | B-Sides The Beatles |
| The Smithereens | "If I Fell" | 2008 | B-Sides The Beatles |
| The Smithereens | "I Don't Want to Spoil the Party" | 2008 | B-Sides The Beatles |
| The Smithereens | "A Hard Day's Night" | | live only |
| Carly Smithson | "Come Together" | 2008 | American Idol performance |
| Carly Smithson | "Blackbird" | 2008 | American Idol performance |
| The Smokin' Mojo Filters | "Come Together" | 1995 | The Help Album |
| Smothers Brothers | "Yesterday" | 1966 | The Smothers Brothers Play It Straight |
| Phoebe Snow | "Don't Let Me Down" | 1976 | It Looks Like Snow |
| Soda Stereo | "I Want You (She's So Heavy)" | 1991 | Av. 9 de Julio – Buenos Aires |
| Sonic Youth | "Ticket to Ride" | 1988 | Master-Dik EP |
| Sonic Youth | "Within You Without You" | 1988 | Sgt. Pepper Knew My Father |
| Sonny & Cher | "Got to Get You into My Life" | 1971 | Sonny & Cher Live |
| Sonny & Cher | "Hey Jude" | 1971 | Sonny & Cher Live |
| Sonny & Cher | "Something" | 1971 | Sonny & Cher Live |
| The Soulful Strings | "The Inner Light" | 1968 | Another Exposure |
| The Soulful Strings | "Within You Without You" | 1967 | Groovin' with the Soulful Strings |
| Soundgarden | "Helter Skelter" | | Live performance |
| Soundgarden | "Come Together" | 1990 | "Hands All Over" single |
| Soundgarden | "Everybody's Got Something to Hide Except Me and My Monkey" | 1989 | Peel Sessions Outtakes |
| Sparks | "I Want to Hold Your Hand" | 2006 | Big Beat re-release bonus track |
| Ronnie Spector | "P.S. I Love You" | 2014 | The Art of McCartney |
| Regina Spektor | "Real Love" | 2007 | Instant Karma: The Amnesty International Campaign to Save Darfur |
| Regina Spektor | "While My Guitar Gently Weeps" | 2016 | Kubo and the Two Strings (Original Motion Picture Soundtrack) |
| Spineshank | "While My Guitar Gently Weeps" | 1998 | Strictly Diesel |
| Luis Alberto Spinetta | "Don't Bother Me" | 2002 | Obras en vivo |
| The Spokesmen | "Michelle" | 1965 | single |
| The Spokesmen | "You've Got to Hide Your Love Away" | 1965 | The Dawn of Correction |
| Spooky Tooth | "I Am the Walrus" | 1970 | The Last Puff |
| Rick Springfield | "For No One" | 2005 | The Day After Yesterday |
| Bruce Springsteen | "Come Together" | | featuring Jon Bon Jovi |
| Bruce Springsteen | "Something" | 2001 | Live performance |
| Spyro Gyra | "In My Life" | 1995 | (I Got No Kick Against) Modern Jazz |
| St. Louis Union | "Girl" | 1966 | single |
| St. Vincent | "Dig a Pony" | | Live performances |
| Stackridge | "Hold Me Tight" | 1976 | Mr. Mick |
| Stackridge | "Old Brown Shoe" | 2001 | Pick of the Crop |
| Michael Stanley | "Eleanor Rigby" | 2000 | Eighteen Down |
| Michael Stanley | "Help!" | 1973 | Friends And Legends |
| Stars on 45 | For a complete list, see "Stars on 45 Medley" | 1981 | The entire first side of the album Stars on Long Play is a medley of snippets of Beatles songs |
| Status Quo | "Getting Better" | 1976 | All This and World War II (Soundtrack) |
| Status Quo | "Get Back" | 1996 | Don't Stop |
| Steel Pulse | "We Can Work It Out" | 2002 | The Tide is High |
| Stereophonics | "Sgt. Pepper's Lonely Hearts Club Band (Reprise)" | 2007 | 40th Anniversary Sgt. Pepper |
| Stereophonics | "Don't Let Me Down" | 2002 | I Am Sam soundtrack |
| Stereophonics | "Revolution" | | Jools Holland's Big Band Rhythm & Blues |
| Stereophonics | "I'm Only Sleeping" | | live featuring Noel Gallagher |
| Leni Stern | "Norwegian Wood (This Bird Has Flown)" | 1993 | Come Together: Guitar tribute To The Beatles |
| Sufjan Stevens | "What Goes On" | 2005 | This Bird Has Flown: 40th Anniversary of Rubber Soul |
| Rod Stewart | "Get Back" | 1976 | All This and World War II (Soundtrack) |
| Rod Stewart | "In My Life" | 1986 | Every Beat of My Heart |
| Stephen Stills | "In My Life" | 1991 | Stills Alone |
| Sting | "A Day in the Life" | 1993 | Demolition Man soundtrack |
| Sting | "Penny Lane" | | |
| Sting & Jeff Beck | "While My Guitar Gently Weeps" | | live performance |
| Rod Stokes & Maelyn Jarmon | "Yesterday" | 2019 | The Voice live performance |
| Stone Temple Pilots | "Revolution" | 2001 | Come Together: A Night for John Lennon's Words and Music / single |
| Barbra Streisand | "Good Night" | 1969 | What About Today? |
| Barbra Streisand | "Honey Pie" | 1969 | What About Today? |
| Barbra Streisand | "With a Little Help from My Friends" | 1969 | What About Today? |
| String Driven Thing | "Things We Said Today" | 1975 | Keep Your 'and On It |
| Jim Sturgess | "Girl" | 2007 | Across the Universe soundtrack |
| Jim Sturgess | "All My Loving" | 2007 | Across the Universe soundtrack |
| Jim Sturgess | "With a Little Help from My Friends" | 2007 | Across the Universe soundtrack |
| Jim Sturgess | "I've Just Seen a Face" | 2007 | Across the Universe soundtrack |
| Jim Sturgess | "Dear Prudence" | 2007 | Across the Universe soundtrack |
| Jim Sturgess | "Because" | 2007 | Across the Universe soundtrack |
| Jim Sturgess | "Something" | 2007 | Across the Universe soundtrack |
| Jim Sturgess | "Strawberry Fields Forever" | 2007 | Across the Universe soundtrack |
| Jim Sturgess | "Revolution" | 2007 | Across the Universe soundtrack |
| Jim Sturgess | "Across the Universe" | 2007 | Across the Universe soundtrack |
| Jim Sturgess | "All You Need Is Love" | 2007 | Across the Universe soundtrack |
| Styx | "I Am the Walrus" | 2005 | Big Bang Theory |
| Suede | "Across the Universe" | | |
| Sugababes | "Come Together" | | |
| Sugarcult | "A Hard Day's Night" | 2005 | A Hard Day's Night (EP) |
| Suggs | "I'm Only Sleeping" | 1995 | The Lone Ranger |
| Sum 41 | "I'm a Loser" | 2003 | |
| Sum 41 | "Oh! Darling" | | |
| Donna Summer | "With a Little Help from My Friends" | 2005 | Greatest Hits Tour |
| The Supremes | "I Want to Hold Your Hand" | 1964 | A Bit of Liverpool |
| The Supremes | "You Can't Do That" | 1964 | A Bit of Liverpool |
| The Supremes | "Can't Buy Me Love" | 1964 | A Bit of Liverpool |
| The Supremes | "A Hard Day's Night" | 1964 | A Bit of Liverpool |
| The Supremes | "Come Together" | 1970 | New Ways but Love Stays |
| The Supremes | "Yesterday" | 1966 | I Hear a Symphony |
| The Supremes | "Medley: Michelle/Yesterday" | 1968 | Live at London's Talk of the Town |
| The Supremes | "I Saw Him Standing There" | 2008 | Let The Music Play: Supreme Rarities 1960–1969 (Motown Lost & Found) |
| The Supremes | "Hey Jude" | 1969 | Cream of the Crop |
| Sweet | "Paperback Writer" | 1973 | Japanese Single (RCA SS – 2380) |
| Matthew Sweet | "She Said She Said" | 1993 | Born to Choose |
| Matthew Sweet & Susanna Hoffs | "And Your Bird Can Sing" | 2006 | Under the Covers, Vol. 1 |
| The Swinging Blue Jeans | "A Hard Day's Night" | 1990 | Live Shakin' |
| The Swinging Blue Jeans | "Eight Days a Week" | 1965 | The Swinging Blue Jeans Live aus dem Cascade Beat Club in Köln (German album) |
| The Swinging Blue Jeans | "I Saw Her Standing There" | 1990 | Live Shakin' |
| The Swinging Blue Jeans | "She Loves You" | 1990 | Live Shakin' |
| The Swinging Blue Jeans | "This Boy" | 1966 | Don't Make Me Over (Canadian album) |
| The Swingle Singers | "Ticket To Ride" | 1999 | Ticket To Ride – A Beatles Tribute |
| The Swingle Singers | "Penny Lane" | 1999 | Ticket To Ride – A Beatles Tribute |
| The Swingle Singers | "Revolution" | 1999 | Ticket To Ride – A Beatles Tribute |
| The Swingle Singers | "Day Tripper" | 1999 | Ticket To Ride – A Beatles Tribute |
| The Swingle Singers | "Norwegian Wood (This Bird Has Flown)" | 1999 | Ticket To Ride – A Beatles Tribute |
| The Swingle Singers | "Birthday" | 1999 | Ticket To Ride – A Beatles Tribute |
| The Swingle Singers | "Lady Madonna" | 1999 | Ticket To Ride – A Beatles Tribute |
| The Swingle Singers | "Yesterday" | 1999 | Ticket To Ride – A Beatles Tribute |
| The Swingle Singers | "Strawberry Fields Forever" | 1999 | Ticket To Ride – A Beatles Tribute |
| The Swingle Singers | "Drive My Car" | 1999 | Ticket To Ride – A Beatles Tribute |
| The Swingle Singers | "Blackbird/I Will" | 1999 | Ticket To Ride – A Beatles Tribute |
| The Swingle Singers | "When I'm Sixty-Four" | 1999 | Ticket To Ride – A Beatles Tribute |
| The Swingle Singers | "The Fool On The Hill" | 1999 | Ticket To Ride – A Beatles Tribute |
| The Swingle Singers | "All My Loving" | 1999 | Ticket To Ride – A Beatles Tribute |
| The Swingle Singers | "I Am The Walrus" | 1999 | Ticket To Ride – A Beatles Tribute |
| The Swingle Singers | "Good Night" | 1999 | Ticket To Ride – A Beatles Tribute |
| Syreeta | "She's Leaving Home" | 1972 | Syreeta |
| T-Square | "Hello, Goodbye" | 1983 | The Water of the Rainbow |
| June Tabor | "In My Life" | 2006 | Rubber Folk |
| Aki Takahashi | "Golden Slumbers" | 2017 | Plays Hyper Beatles Volume 1 |
| Aki Takahashi | "Michelle" | 2017 | Plays Hyper Beatles Volume 1 |
| Aki Takahashi | "Blue Jay Way" | 2017 | Plays Hyper Beatles Volume 1 |
| Aki Takahashi | "Norwegian Wood (This Bird Has Flown)" | 2017 | Plays Hyper Beatles Volume 1 |
| Aki Takahashi | "Blackbird" | 2017 | Plays Hyper Beatles Volume 1 |
| Aki Takahashi | "Blue Jay Way" | 2017 | Plays Hyper Beatles Volume 1 |
| Aki Takahashi | "Yesterday" | 2017 | Plays Hyper Beatles Volume 1 |
| Aki Takahashi | "Do You Want to Know a Secret" | 2017 | Plays Hyper Beatles Volume 1 |
| Aki Takahashi | "Because" | 2017 | Plays Hyper Beatles Volume 1 |
| Aki Takahashi | "Happiness Is a Warm Gun" | 2017 | Plays Hyper Beatles Volume 1 |
| Aki Takahashi | "Julia" | 2017 | Plays Hyper Beatles Volume 1 |
| Aki Takahashi | "Let It Be" | 2017 | Plays Hyper Beatles Volume 1 |
| Aki Takahashi | "Across the Universe" | 2017 | Plays Hyper Beatles Volume 1 |
| Aki Takahashi | "Come Together" | 2017 | Plays Hyper Beatles Volume 1 |
| Yukihiro Takahashi | "It's All Too Much" | 1982 | What, Me Worry? |
| Yukihiro Takahashi | "Tomorrow Never Knows" | 1988 | Ego |
| Yukihiro Takahashi | "Taxman" | 1994 | Mr YT |
| Yukihiro Takahashi | "I Need You" | 1998 | A Ray Of Hope |
| Yukihiro Takahashi | "You've Got to Hide Your Love Away" | 2009 | Page by Page |
| Take That | "A Hard Day's Night" | 1994 | UK Single " Everything Changes " (Part Of a Beatles Medley) |
| Take That | "Hey Jude" | | |
| Take That | "I Feel Fine" | | |
| Take That | "I Want To Hold Your Hand" | 1994 | UK Single " Everything Changes " (Part of a Beatles Medley) |
| Take That | "She Loves You" | 1994 | UK Single " Everything Changes " (Part of a Beatles medley) |
| The Tallest Man on Earth | "In My Life" | 2022 | Too Late for Edelweiss |
| Tally Hall | "The Continuing Story of Bungalow Bill" | | |
| Tally Hall | "Why Don't We Do It in the Road?" | | |
| John Tams | "Girl" | 2006 | Rubber Folk |
| Serj Tankian | "Girl" | | |
| Ben Taylor | "I Will" | 1995 | Bye Bye, Love (Soundtrack) |
| James Taylor | "Yesterday" | | |
| James Taylor | "Day Tripper" | 1979 | Flag |
| James Taylor | "In My Life" | 2010 | 82nd Academy Awards |
| Martin Taylor | "Here, There And Everywhere" | | |
| Martin Taylor | "Day Tripper" | | |
| Roger Taylor | "Golden Slumbers/Carry That Weight/The End" | 2006 | UK Music Hall of Fame Induction Ceremony |
| Tea Leaf Green | "Helter Skelter" | | |
| Tea Leaf Green | "While My Guitar Gently Weeps" | | |
| Tea Leaf Green | "Ticket to Ride" | | |
| Tea Leaf Green | "I've Got a Feeling" | | |
| Tea Leaf Green | "Everybody's Got Something to Hide Except Me and My Monkey" | | |
| Tea Leaf Green | "The Continuing Story of Bungalow Bill" | | |
| Tea Leaf Green | "It's All Too Much" | | |
| Tea Leaf Green | "Hey Bulldog" | | |
| Tears for Fears | "All You Need Is Love" | 1990 | Going to California |
| Teenage Fanclub | "The Ballad of John and Yoko" | 1990 | single |
| Teenage Fanclub | "Tell Me What You See" | 2001 | Why Don't We Do It In The Road |
| Hans Teeuwen | Beatles Medley | | Live performance |
| The Temptations | "Hey Jude" | 1969 | Puzzle People |
| Tenacious D | "You Never Give Me Your Money" / "The End" | | Live performances |
| Bobby Tench | "We Can Work It Out" | | |
| Tesla | "We Can Work It Out" | 1990 | Five Man Acoustical Jam |
| Texas | "Revolution" | 1993 | "You Owe It All to Me" CD single |
| Texas Lightning | "Norwegian Wood (This Bird Has Flown)" | 2005 | Meanwhile, Back at the Ranch (album) |
| Jimmy Thackery | "Why Don't We Do It in the Road?" | 2002 | The Blues White Album |
| They Might Be Giants | "Savoy Truffle" | 2003 | Songs From The Material World : A Tribute To George Harrison |
| They Might Be Giants | "Yellow Submarine" | | |
| Nicky Thomas | "Let It Be" | 1970 | B -Side of "Turn Back The Hands Of Time" single |
| Richard Thompson | "It Won't Be Long" | 2003 | 1000 Years of Popular Music |
| Thompson Twins | "Revolution" | 1985 | Here's to Future Days |
| Three Good Reasons | "Nowhere Man" | 1966 | Single |
| The Three Sounds | "Get Back" | 1991 | Blue Beat: Blue Note Plays the Music of Lennon and McCartney |
| Thrice | "Eleanor Rigby" | | |
| Thrice | "I've Just Seen a Face" | | |
| Thrice | "Helter Skelter" | 2009 | Beggars |
| Thrice | "The Ballad of John and Yoko" | | |
| Tiffany | "I Saw Her Standing There" as "I Saw Him Standing There" | 1987 | Tiffany |
| Tiny Tim | "Girl" | 1996 | Girl |
| Tiny Tim | "Hey Jude" | 1996 | Girl |
| Andy Timmons | "She's Leaving Home" | 1998 | Orange Swirl |
| Titãs | "The Ballad of John and Yoko" as "Balada para John e Yoko" | 1984 | Titãs |
| Cal Tjader | "Lady Madonna" | 1969 | Cal Tjader Plugs In |
| Toad the Wet Sprocket | "Hey Bulldog" | 1997 | I Know What You Did Last Summer |
| Toadies | "Don't Let Me Down" | 2010 | Feeler iTunes bonus track |
| Tok Tok Tok | "Come Together" | 2009 | Revolution 69 |
| Tok Tok Tok | "We Can Work It Out" | 2009 | Revolution 69 |
| Tok Tok Tok | "Blackbird" | 2009 | Revolution 69 |
| Tok Tok Tok | "Taxman" | 2009 | Revolution 69 |
| Tok Tok Tok | "Get Back" | 2009 | Revolution 69 |
| Tok Tok Tok | "Dear Prudence" | 2009 | Revolution 69 |
| Tok Tok Tok | "I Will" | 2009 | Revolution 69 |
| Tok Tok Tok | "Lady Madonna" | 2009 | Revolution 69 |
| Tok Tok Tok | "Being for the Benefit of Mr. Kite!" | 2009 | Revolution 69 |
| Tok Tok Tok | "She's Leaving Home" | 2009 | Revolution 69 |
| Tok Tok Tok | "Help!" | 2009 | Revolution 69 |
| Tok Tok Tok | "Run for Your Life" | 2009 | Revolution 69 |
| Tok Tok Tok | "Why Don't We Do It in the Road?" | 2009 | Revolution 69 |
| Tok Tok Tok | "Revolution 1" | 2009 | Revolution 69 |
| Tok Tok Tok | "I'll Follow the Sun" | 2009 | Revolution 69 |
| Tongo | "Let it Be" as "Lady bi" | 2011 | single |
| Néstor Torres | "She's Leaving Home" | 1995 | Hey Jude (Tributo A Los Beatles) |
| Peter Tosh | "Here Comes the Sun" | 1971 | Single |
| Toto | "With a Little Help from My Friends" | 1993 | Absolutely Live |
| Toto | "While My Guitar Gently Weeps" | 2002 | Through the Looking Glass |
| Allen Toussaint | "Lady Madonna" | 2014 | The Art of McCartney |
| Ralph Towner | "Here, There and Everywhere" | 1993 | Come Together – Guitar Tribute to The Beatles, Vol. 1 |
| Transatlantic | "And I Love Her" | 2001 | Bridge Across Forever |
| Transatlantic | "Abbey Road medley" (within "Suite Charlotte Pike Medley") | 2003 | Live in Europe |
| Transatlantic | Beatles Medley ("Magical Mystery Tour", "Strawberry Fields Forever") | 2001 | Live in America |
| Translator | "Cry for a Shadow" | 1983 | Break Down The Barriers 12" Single |
| Trashcan Sinatras | "Tomorrow Never Knows" | | On A B Road |
| Travis | "Lovely Rita" | 2007 | Sgt. Pepper's Lonely Hearts Club Band – 40th Anniversary BBC Broadcast |
| Travis | "You've Got to Hide Your Love Away" | | |
| Travis | "Here Comes the Sun" | 2002 | "Flowers In The Window" single |
| Randy Travis | "Nowhere Man" | 1995 | Come Together: America Salutes The Beatles |
| The Tremeloes | "Good Day Sunshine" | 1967 | Here Come The Tremeloes |
| The Triffids | "Good Morning Good Morning" | 1988 | Sgt. Pepper Knew My Father |
| Trixter | "Revolution" | 1994 | Undercovers |
| Trouble | "Tomorrow Never Knows" | 1995 | Plastic Green Head |
| The Tubes | "I Saw Her Standing There" | 1978 | What Do You Want from Live |
| Tanya Tucker | "Something" | 1995 | Come Together: America Salutes The Beatles |
| Mike Herrera's Tumbledown | "I've Just Seen a Face" | | (performed live on a regular basis) |
| Ike & Tina Turner | "With a Little Help from my Friends" | 1969 | B-side to "I Wish It Would Rain" |
| Ike & Tina Turner | "Come Together" | 1970 | Come Together |
| Ike & Tina Turner | "Get Back" | 1970 | Workin' Together |
| Ike & Tina Turner | "Let It Be" | 1970 | Workin' Together |
| Ike & Tina Turner | "She Came in Through the Bathroom Window" | 1972 | Feel Good |
| Ike & Tina Turner | "With a Little Help from my Friends" | 1973 | Live! The World of Ike & Tina |
| Ike & Tina Turner | "Something" | | |
| Joe Lynn Turner | "Helter Skelter" | 1999 | Under Cover 2 |
| Tina Turner | "Come Together" | 1976 | All This and World War II (Soundtrack) |
| Tina Turner | "Help!" | 1984 | Private Dancer |
| Tina Turner | "Beatles Medley" | | |
| Stanley Turrentine | "Can't Buy Me Love" | 1964 | Mr. Natural |
| Stanley Turrentine | "Hey Jude" | 1968 | Blue Beat: Blue Note Plays the Music of Lennon and McCartney |
| Twenty 4 Seven | "Something" | 2009 | A New Abbey Road – A Tribute To The Beatles |
| Bonnie Tyler | "In My Life" | 2002 | Heart Strings |
| Steven Tyler | "Across the Universe" | 2005 | 47th Grammy Awards |
| McCoy Tyner | "She's Leaving Home" | 1995 | I Got No Kick Against Modern Jazz |
| Type O Negative | "Day Tripper" / "If I Needed Someone" / "I Want You (She's So Heavy)" | 1999 | World Coming Down |
| Judie Tzuke | "Hey Jude" | 2003 | The Beauty of Hindsight |
| U2 | "You've Got to Hide Your Love Away" | | |
| U2 | "Helter Skelter" | 1988 | Rattle and Hum |
| U2 | "Rain" | | |
| U2 | "Help!" | | |
| U2 | "Blackbird" | | |
| U2 | "Sgt. Pepper's Lonely Hearts Club Band" | | |
| U2 | "Happiness Is a Warm Gun" | 1997 | "Last Night On Earth" single |
| U2 | "Dear Prudence" | | |
| U2 | "Norwegian Wood (This Bird Has Flown)" | | |
| UB40 | "I'll Be Back" | 2008 | TwentyFourSeven |
| Umphrey's McGee | "I Want You (She's So Heavy)" | 2015 | The London Sessions |
| The Undead | "All You Need Is Love" | 1998 | Til Death! |
| Underground Sunshine | "Birthday" | 1969 | Single |
| Usher | "With a Little Help from my Friends" | 2011 | William J. Clinton A Decade of Difference |
| Frankie Valli | "A Day in the Life" | 1976 | All This and World War II (Soundtrack) |
| Vampiri | "I Saw Her Standing There" | 1992 | Be-Be |
| The Johnny Van Zant Band | "Drive My Car" | 1981 | Round Two |
| Vanilla Fudge | "Ticket to Ride" | 1967 | Vanilla Fudge |
| Vanilla Fudge | "Eleanor Rigby" | 1967 | Vanilla Fudge |
| Vanilla Fudge | "I Want to Hold Your Hand/I Feel Fine/Day Tripper/She Loves You" (medley) | 1968 | The Beat Goes On |
| Sarah Vaughan | "Michelle" | 1966 | The New Scene |
| Sarah Vaughan | "Get Back" | 1981 | Songs of The Beatles |
| Sarah Vaughan | "And I Love Her" | 1981 | Songs of The Beatles |
| Sarah Vaughan | "Eleanor Rigby" | 1981 | Songs of The Beatles |
| Sarah Vaughan | "The Fool on the Hill" | 1981 | Songs of The Beatles |
| Sarah Vaughan | "You Never Give Me Your Money" | 1981 | Songs of The Beatles |
| Sarah Vaughan | "Come Together" | 1981 | Songs of The Beatles |
| Sarah Vaughan | "I Want You (She's So Heavy)" | 1981 | Songs of The Beatles |
| Sarah Vaughan | "Blackbird" | 1981 | Songs of The Beatles |
| Sarah Vaughan | "Something" | 1981 | Songs of The Beatles |
| Sarah Vaughan | "Here, There and Everywhere" | 1981 | Songs of The Beatles |
| Sarah Vaughan | "The Long and Winding Road" | 1981 | Songs of The Beatles |
| Sarah Vaughan | "Yesterday" | 1981 | Songs of The Beatles |
| Sarah Vaughan | "Hey Jude" | 1981 | Songs of The Beatles |
| Stevie Ray Vaughan & Double Trouble | "Taxman" | 1995 | Greatest Hits |
| Billy Vaughn | "Michelle" | 1966 | Michelle |
| Tony Vega | "Hey Jude" | 1996 | Tropical Tribute to the Beatles |
| Eddie Vedder | "You've Got to Hide Your Love Away" | 2002 | I Am Sam soundtrack |
| Eddie Vedder | "Day Tripper" | | |
| Eddie Vedder | "Magical Mystery Tour" | 2016 | The Beat Bugs: Complete Season 1 |
| Caetano Veloso | "Eleanor Rigby" | 1975 | QualQuer Coisa |
| Caetano Veloso | "For No One" | 1975 | QualQuer Coisa |
| Caetano Veloso | "Lady Madonna" | 1975 | QualQuer Coisa |
| Caetano Veloso | "You're Going to Lose That Girl" | | |
| The Ventures | "Eleanor Rigby" | 1970 | 10th Anniversary Album |
| The Ventures | "Hey Jude" | 1970 | 10th Anniversary Album |
| The Ventures | "I Feel Fine" | 1965 | Knock Me Out ! |
| The Ventures | "Let it Be" | 1970 | 10th Anniversary Album |
| The Ventures | "Michelle" | 1970 | 10th Anniversary Album |
| The Ventures | "Strawberry Fields Forever" | 1967 | Liberty 55967 single |
| Carl Verheyen | "Yes It Is" | 2003 | SIX |
| The Verve Pipe | "Strawberry Fields Forever" | 1996 | "Photograph" single |
| The View | "I've Just Seen a Face" | 2007 | " The Don/Skag Trendy" Maxi – Single CD |
| The Vines | "I'm Only Sleeping" | 2002 | I Am Sam soundtrack |
| The Vines | "Helter Skelter" | 2007 | Live performance |
| Anne Sofie von Otter | "For No One" | 2001 | For The Stars |
| Anne Sofie von Otter and Brad Mehldau | "Blackbird" | 2010 | Love Songs |
| Anne Sofie von Otter and Brad Mehldau | "Because" | 2010 | Love Songs |
| Cornelis Vreeswijk | "Get Back" | | |
| Voodoo Glow Skulls | "Here Comes the Sun" | 1993 | Who Is, This Is ? |
| Vow Wow | "Helter Skelter" | 1989 | Helter Skelter |
| The Wailers | "And I Love Her" | 1965 | The Wailing Wailers at Studio One |
| Rufus Wainwright | "Across the Universe" | 2002 | I Am Sam soundtrack |
| Rick Wakeman | "Norwegian Wood (This Bird Has Flown)" | 1997 | Tribute |
| Rick Wakeman | "You've Got To Hide Your Love Away" | 1997 | Tribute |
| Rick Wakeman | "The Fool On The Hill" | 1997 | Tribute |
| Rick Wakeman | "Eleanor Rigby" | 1997 | Tribute |
| Rick Wakeman | "Come Together" | 1997 | Tribute |
| Rick Wakeman | "While My Guitar Gently Weeps" | 1997 | Tribute |
| Rick Wakeman | "We Can Work It Out" | 1997 | Tribute |
| Rick Wakeman | "Help!" | 1997 | Tribute |
| Rick Wakeman | "Things We Said Today" | 1997 | Tribute |
| Rick Wakeman | "Blackbird" | 1997 | Tribute |
| Rick Wakeman | "She's Leaving Home" | 1997 | Tribute |
| Joe Louis Walker | "While My Guitar Gently Weeps" | 2006 | The Blues White Album |
| The Wallflowers | "I'm Looking Through You" | 2002 | I Am Sam soundtrack |
| Wang Chung | "Rain" | 2010 | The Beatles Complete On Ukulele |
| Steve Wariner | "Get Back" | 1995 | Come Together: America Salutes The Beatles |
| Jennifer Warnes (as Jennifer Warren) | "Here, There and Everywhere" | 1968 | I Can Remember Everything (Parrot 71020) |
| Dionne Warwick | "We Can Work It Out" | 1969 | Soulful |
| Dionne Warwick | "A Hard Day's Night" | 1969 | Soulful |
| Dionne Warwick | "Hey Jude" | 1969 | Soulful |
| Dionne Warwick | "Something" | 1970 | I'll Never Fall in Love Again |
| The Waterboys | "Blackbird" | | |
| Roger Waters | "Across the Universe" | | |
| Newton Wayland | "Penny Lane" | 2006 | Best of the Beatles (Classical Interpretations) |
| Newton Wayland | "When I'm Sixty-Four" | 2006 | Best of the Beatles (Classical Interpretations) |
| Stan Webb | "I Saw Her Standing There" | 2002 | The Beatles Tribute – Come Together |
| The Wedding Present with Amelia Fletcher | "Getting Better" | 1988 | Sgt. Pepper Knew My Father |
| Ween | "Something" | | |
| Lawrence Welk | "Hey Jude" | 1969 | Galveston |
| Lawrence Welk | "Yesterday" | 1965 | Today's Great Hits |
| Paul Weller | "All You Need Is Love" | | (Live with Noel Gallagher) |
| Paul Weller | "Birthday" | 2012 | promo single on Paul McCartney's 70th |
| Paul Weller | "Come Together" | | |
| Paul Weller | "Don't Let Me Down" | | |
| Paul Weller | "Sexy Sadie" | 1994 | Out Of The Sinking |
| Paul Weller | "Sexy Sadie" | 1994 | Out Of The Sinking |
| Mary Wells | "Ticket to Ride" | 1965 | Love Songs to the Beatles |
| Mary Wells | "All My Loving" | 1965 | Love Songs to the Beatles |
| Mary Wells | "She Loves You" | 1965 | Love Songs to the Beatles Recorded as "He Loves You" |
| Mary Wells | "Please Please Me" | 1965 | Love Songs to the Beatles |
| Mary Wells | "Do You Want to Know a Secret" | 1965 | Love Songs to the Beatles |
| Mary Wells | "Can't Buy Me Love" | 1965 | Love Songs to the Beatles |
| Mary Wells | "I Should Have Known Better" | 1965 | Love Songs to the Beatles |
| Mary Wells | "Help!" | 1965 | Love Songs to the Beatles |
| Mary Wells | "Eight Days a Week" | 1965 | Love Songs to the Beatles |
| Mary Wells | "Yesterday" | 1965 | Love Songs to the Beatles |
| Mary Wells | "I Saw Her Standing There" | 1965 | Love Songs to the Beatles Recorded as "I Saw Him Standing There" |
| Leslie West | "Eleanor Rigby" | 2015 | Soundcheck |
| Mae West | "Day Tripper" | 1966 | Way Out West |
| Paul Westerberg | "Nowhere Man" | 2002 | I Am Sam soundtrack |
| Wet Wet Wet | "With a Little Help from My Friends" | 1988 | Sgt. Pepper Knew My Father |
| Wet Wet Wet | "Yesterday" | 1997 | Ten Again (Bonus Disc) |
| Chris While | "Nowhere Man" | 2006 | Rubber Folk |
| Brooke White | "Let It Be" | 2008 | American Idol performance |
| Brooke White | "Here Comes the Sun" | 2008 | American Idol performance |
| Jack White | "While My Guitar Gently Weeps" | | |
| Jack White | "Mother Nature's Son" | | |
| Lenny White | "Lady Madonna" | 1978 | Streamline |
| White Zombie | "Helter Skelter" | 1993 | Resurrection Day |
| Whitesnake | "Day Tripper" | 1978 | Trouble |
| Wesla Whitfield | "In My Life" | 2014 | The Beatles: A Jazz Tribute, Celebrating 50 Years |
| The Who | "I Saw Her Standing There" | | |
| Widespread Panic | "Across the Universe" | | |
| Widespread Panic | "The Ballad of John and Yoko" | 2012 | Wood |
| Widespread Panic | "Come Together" | 2005 | 2005-06-11 Bonnaroo Manchester, TN USA |
| Widespread Panic | "Run For Your Life" | | |
| Widespread Panic | "Why Don't We Do It in the Road?" | | |
| Widespread Panic | "Yer Blues" | | |
| Andy Williams | "Michelle" | 1968 | The Shadow of Your Smile |
| Andy Williams | "Yesterday" | 1968 | The Shadow of Your Smile |
| Dar Williams | "You Won't See Me" | 2005 | This Bird Has Flown – A 40th Anniversary Tribute to the Beatles' Rubber Soul |
| John Williams | "The Fool on the Hill" | | |
| John Williams | "Here Comes the Sun" | 1998 | In My Life |
| Robbie Williams | "Good Day Sunshine" | 2016 | The Beat Bugs: Complete Season 1 |
| Robin Williams with Bobby McFerrin | "Come Together" | 1998 | In My Life |
| Brian Wilson | "She's Leaving Home" | | |
| Brian Wilson | "Across the Universe" | 2005 | 47th Grammy Awards |
| Cassandra Wilson | "Blackbird" | 2010 | Silver Pony |
| Jackie Wilson | "Eleanor Rigby" | 1969 | Do Your Thing |
| Kai Winding | "Penny Lane" | 1967 | Penny Lane & Time |
| Kai Winding | "Eleanor Rigby" | 1967 | Penny Lane & Time |
| Kai Winding | "Here, There and Everywhere" | 1967 | Penny Lane & Time |
| Amy Winehouse | "All My Loving" | 2016 | All My Lovin' |
| Bill Withers | "Let It Be" | 1971 | Just as I Am |
| Tom Wolk | "Don't Pass Me By" | 1971 | The Blues White Album |
| Stevie Wonder | "We Can Work It Out" | 1970 | Signed, Sealed & Delivered |
| Stevie Wonder | "Across the Universe" | 2005 | 47th Grammy Awards |
| Stevie Wonder | "She Loves You" | 2012 | |
| Evan Rachel Wood | "Hold Me Tight" | 2007 | Across the Universe: Music from the Motion Picture |
| Evan Rachel Wood | "It Won't Be Long" | 2007 | Across the Universe: Music from the Motion Picture |
| Evan Rachel Wood | "If I Fell" | 2007 | Across the Universe: Music from the Motion Picture |
| Evan Rachel Wood | "Blackbird" | 2007 | Across the Universe: Music from the Motion Picture |
| Roy Wood | "Lovely Rita" | 1976 | All This and World War II (Soundtrack) |
| Roy Wood | "Polythene Pam" | 1976 | All This and World War II (Soundtrack) |
| Carol Woods with Timothy T. Mitchum | "Let It Be" | 2007 | Across the Universe: Music from the Motion Picture |
| Victor Wooten | "Norwegian Wood (This Bird Has Flown)" | 1997 | What Did He Say? |
| World Party | "Happiness Is a Warm Gun" | 1991 | Thank You World EP |
| Link Wray and his Ray Men | "Please Please Me" | 2004 | The Swan Singles Collection 1963 – 1967 |
| Charles Wright | "Here Comes the Sun" | 1972 | Rhythm & Poetry |
| Wu-Tang Clan (with Erykah Badu, John Frusciante, and Dhani Harrison) | Elements of "While My Guitar Gently Weeps" in "The Heart Gently Weeps" | | |
| Bill Wyman | "Taxman" | 2004 | Just For A Thrill |
| XTC | "Strawberry Fields Forever" | 2003 | Fuzzy Warbles Volume 3 |
| XTC | "I Am the Walrus" | | |
| "Weird Al" Yankovic | "Taxman" | | Parodied as "Pacman" |
| "Weird Al" Yankovic | "Free as a Bird" | | Parodied as "Gee, I'm a Nerd" (Live Only) |
| Yanni | "Nowhere Man" | 1988 | Steal The Sky ( Soundtrack ) |
| Yeah Yeah Yeahs | "While My Guitar Gently Weeps" | | |
| Yellow Magic Orchestra | "Day Tripper" | 1979 | Solid State Survivor |
| Yellow Magic Orchestra | "All You Need Is Love" | 1996 | World Tour 1980 In the intro, instead of La Marseillaise, the Star-Spangled Banner is played in its place. |
| Yellow Magic Orchestra | "Hello, Goodbye" | | |
| Yellow Matter Custard | "A Day in the Life" | 2003 | One Night In New York City |
| Yellow Matter Custard | "Baby's in Black" | 2003 | One Night In New York City |
| Yellow Matter Custard | "Come Together" | 2003 | One Night In New York City |
| Yellow Matter Custard | "Dear Prudence" | 2003 | One Night In New York City |
| Yellow Matter Custard | "Dig a Pony" | 2003 | One Night In New York City |
| Yellow Matter Custard | "Everybody's Got Something to Hide Except Me and My Monkey" | 2003 | One Night In New York City |
| Yellow Matter Custard | "Free as a Bird" | 2003 | One Night In New York City |
| Yellow Matter Custard | "Good Morning Good Morning" | 2003 | One Night In New York City |
| Yellow Matter Custard | "I Am the Walrus" | 2003 | One Night In New York City |
| Yellow Matter Custard | "I'll Be Back" | 2003 | One Night In New York City |
| Yellow Matter Custard | "I Call Your Name" | 2003 | One Night In New York City |
| Yellow Matter Custard | "I Want You (She's So Heavy)" | 2003 | One Night In New York City |
| Yellow Matter Custard | "Lovely Rita" | 2003 | One Night In New York City |
| Yellow Matter Custard | "Magical Mystery Tour" | 2003 | One Night In New York City |
| Yellow Matter Custard | "The Night Before" | 2003 | One Night In New York City |
| Yellow Matter Custard | "No Reply" | 2003 | One Night In New York City |
| Yellow Matter Custard | "Nowhere Man" | 2003 | One Night In New York City |
| Yellow Matter Custard | "Oh! Darling" | 2003 | One Night In New York City |
| Yellow Matter Custard | "Rain" | 2003 | One Night In New York City |
| Yellow Matter Custard | "Revolution" | 2003 | One Night In New York City |
| Yellow Matter Custard | "Sgt. Pepper's Lonely Hearts Club Band (Reprise)" | 2003 | One Night In New York City |
| Yellow Matter Custard | "She Said She Said" | 2003 | One Night In New York City |
| Yellow Matter Custard | "Think for Yourself" | 2003 | One Night In New York City |
| Yellow Matter Custard | "Ticket to Ride" | 2003 | One Night In New York City |
| Yellow Matter Custard | "Wait" | 2003 | One Night In New York City |
| Yellow Matter Custard | "When I Get Home" | 2003 | One Night In New York City |
| Yellow Matter Custard | "While My Guitar Gently Weeps" | 2003 | One Night In New York City |
| Yellow Matter Custard | "You're Going to Lose That Girl" | 2003 | One Night In New York City |
| Yellow Matter Custard | "You Can't Do That" | 2003 | One Night In New York City |
| Yellow Matter Custard | "You Know My Name (Look Up the Number)" | 2003 | One Night In New York City |
| Yes | "Every Little Thing" | 1969 | Yes ( 1st LP ) |
| Yes | "I'm Down" | 1991 | (live) + Yesyears Box Set – Disc 3 |
| Dwight Yoakam | "Things We Said Today" | 1997 | Under the Covers |
| Yonder Mountain String Band | "Think for Yourself" | 2005 | This Bird Has Flown – A 40th Anniversary Tribute to the Beatles' Rubber Soul |
| Pete York | "Something" | 1990 | String Time In New York |
| Pete York | "Mother Nature's Son" | 1990 | String Time In New York |
| Neil Young | "A Day in the Life" | | |
| Neil Young | "Blackbird" | | |
| Yuri | "Ob-La-Di Ob-La-Da" | 1995 | Hey Jude (Tributo A Los Beatles) |
| Yusuf | "The Long and Winding Road" | 2014 | The Art of McCartney |
| Dweezil Zappa | "Any Time at All" | 2009 | Abbey Road: A Tribute to the Beatles |
| Frank Zappa | "The Texas Motel Medley":"Norwegian Wood, Lucy in the Sky with Diamonds (Louisiana Hooker with Herpes), Strawberry Fields Forever" | | (Unreleased) Zappa's parody versions of the songs about Jimmy Swaggart's travails |
| Frank Zappa | "I Am the Walrus" | | |
| Zoot | "Eleanor Rigby" | 1971 | Zoot Out + 1970 Single ( A Side ) |
| The Zutons | "Good Morning Good Morning" | 2007 | Sgt. Pepper's Lonely Hearts Club Band – 40th Anniversary BBC Broadcast |
| Zwan | "Don't Let Me Down" | 2002 | The True Poets Of Zwan |
| Char | "Taxman" | 2011 | TRADROCK "The B" |
| Char | "And Your Bird Can Sing" | 2011 | TRADROCK "The B" |
| Char | "A Hard Day's Night" | 2011 | TRADROCK "The B" |
| Char | "Tomorrow Never Knows" | 2011 | TRADROCK "The B" |
| Char | "Ticket to Ride" | 2011 | TRADROCK "The B" |
| Char | "I Feel Fine" | 2011 | TRADROCK "The B" |
| Char | "Help!" | 2011 | TRADROCK "The B" |
| Rita Eriksen | "Glass Onion" | 2009 | The White Concert |
| The Analogues | "Glass Onion" | 2018 | Live performances |
| Dave Grohl and Jeff Lynne | "Hey Bulldog" | 2014 | The Night That Changed America: A Grammy Salute to the Beatles |
| Imagine Dragons | "Revolution 1" | 2014 | The Night That Changed America: A Grammy Salute to the Beatles |
| Katy Perry | "Yesterday" | 2014 | The Night That Changed America: A Grammy Salute to the Beatles |
| John Legend and Alicia Keys | "Let It Be" | 2014 | The Night That Changed America: A Grammy Salute to the Beatles |
| Brad Paisley and Pharrell Williams | "Here Comes the Sun" | 2014 | The Night That Changed America: A Grammy Salute to the Beatles |
| Eurythmics | "The Fool on the Hill" | 2014 | The Night That Changed America: A Grammy Salute to the Beatles |
| Dave Grohl, Joe Walsh and Gary Clark Jr. | "While My Guitar Gently Weeps" | 2014 | The Night That Changed America: A Grammy Salute to the Beatles |
| Joe Walsh, Jeff Lynne and Dhani Harrison | "Something" | 2014 | The Night That Changed America: A Grammy Salute to the Beatles |
| Maroon 5 | "Ticket to Ride" | 2014 | The Night That Changed America: A Grammy Salute to the Beatles |
| Maroon 5 | "All My Loving" | 2014 | The Night That Changed America: A Grammy Salute to the Beatles |
| Maroon 5 | "Yesterday" | 2012 | The Howard Stern Show |
| Lorne Balfe and Adam Price | "Now and Then" | 2024 | Argylle Original Motion Picture Soundtrack |
| The Kennedys | "Now and Then" | 2023 | 43rd Annual John Lennon Tribute |
| The Kennedys | "A Day In The Life" | 2007 | 27th Annual John Lennon Tribute |
| Martin Sexton | "A Day In The Life" | 2022 | 42nd Annual John Lennon Tribute |
| Martin Sexton | "Dear Prudence" | 2015 | 35th Annual John Lennon Tribute |
| Catherine Russell | "I'm Only Sleeping" | 2022 | 42nd Annual John Lennon Tribute |
| Jimmy Vivino | "Rain" | 2021 | 41st Annual John Lennon Tribute |
| Susanna Hoffs | "All I've Got to Do" | 2012 | Live performance |
| The Bangles | "Because" | 2014 | Live performance |
| Ronnie Wood and Kelly Jones | "Don't Let Me Down" | 2012 | The Ronnie Wood Show |
| Seal | "Lucy In The Sky With Diamonds" | 2007 | The Royal Variety Performance |
| Natalie Cole | "Lucy In The Sky With Diamonds" | 1978 | Natalie Live! |
| Russell Brand and Bond | "I Am the Walrus" | 2012 | Olympics Closing Ceremony |
| Pearl Jam | "Rain" | 2014 | Live performance |
| Heart | "Rain" | 2014 | Live performance |
| Matthew Sweet and Susanna Hoffs | "Rain" | | |
| Geoff Tate | "Lucy In The Sky With Diamonds" | 2006 | Butchering The Beatles: A Headbashing Tribute |
| Natasha Bedingfield | "Day Tripper" | 2019 | The Radio 2 Breakfast Show |
| Holly Cole | "I'm Only Sleeping" | 1996 | Strawberry Fields |
| Lobo | "I'm Only Sleeping" | 1974 | Just a Singer |
| The Analogues | "All You Need Is Love" | 2023 | Silvester 2023 am Brandenburger Tor |
| The Mamas & the Papas | "Nowhere Man" | 1966 | Hullabaloo (TV series) |
| MonaLisa Twins | "Nowhere Man" | 2021 | |
| Billy Idol | "Tomorrow Never Knows" | 2006 | Butchering The Beatles: A Headbashing Tribute |
| Chris Smither | "She Said She Said" | 2018 | Call Me Lucky |
| Gilby Clarke | "Happiness Is a Warm Gun" | 1997 | The Hangover |
| Marc Ribot | "Happiness Is a Warm Gun" | 2002 | Saints |
| The Analogues | "Happiness Is a Warm Gun" | 2018 | The White Album (Live in Liverpool) |
| Dianne Reeves & Cassandra Wilson | "Come Together" | 1996 | Strawberry Fields |
| Tom Jones and Jennifer Hudson, will.i.am, Olly Murs | "Come Together" | 2018 | The Voice UK |
| Shakira and Adam Levine, Usher, Blake Shelton | "Come Together" | 2013 | The Voice |
| Henry Mancini | "If I Fell" | 1965 | The Music of Lennon & McCartney |
| Shakey Graves | "Real Love" | 2020 | Real Love |
| The Last Shadow Puppets | "I Want You (She's So Heavy)" | 2008 | Live performance |
| Joan Osborne | "Tomorrow Never Knows" | 2019 | 39th Annual John Lennon Tribute |
| Joan Osborne | "I Am The Walrus" | 2009 | 29th Annual John Lennon Tribute |
| Dana Fuchs | "Across the Universe" | 2013 | 33rd Annual John Lennon Tribute |
| Natalie Merchant | "I'm Only Sleeping" | 2019 | 39th Annual John Lennon Tribute |
| Jackson Browne | "You've Got To Hide Your Love Away" | 2010 | 30th Annual John Lennon Tribute |
| Keb' Mo' | "In My Life" | 2010 | 30th Annual John Lennon Tribute |
| Lisa Bouchelle | "Don't Let Me Down" | 2007 | Annual John Lennon Tribute |
| Katy Perry | "All You Need Is Love" | 2021 | All You Need Is Love |
| Taj Mahal with Deva Mahal | "Come Together" | 2010 | 30th Annual John Lennon Tribute |
| Charlie Byrd | "Girl" | 1966 | Byrdland |
| Dalida | "Girl" | 1966 | Dalida |
| David Broza | "Girl" | 2022 | 42nd Annual John Lennon Tribute |
| Mike Douglas with Joe Harnell & Band | "Michelle" | | The Mike Douglas Show |
| Rod Stewart and Joe Cocker, Paul McCartney, Eric Clapton, Brian May | "All You Need Is Love" | 2002 | Golden Jubilee of Elizabeth II |
| Anita Kerr | "All You Need Is Love" | 1967 | All You Need Is Love |
| Iiro Rantala | "All You Need Is Love" | 2015 | My Working Class Hero |
| Sheryl Crow and Steven Tyler, Aloe Blacc, Eric Church, Kris Kristofferson, Peter Frampton, Willie Nelson, John Fogerty, Pat Monahan, Brandon Flowers, The Roots , Chris Stapleton, Tom Morello, Juanes, Spoon | "All You Need Is Love" | 2015 | Imagine: John Lennon 75th Birthday Concert |
| Sheryl Crow | "A Hard Day's Night" | 2015 | Imagine: John Lennon 75th Birthday Concert |
| Peter Frampton | "Norwegian Wood (This Bird Has Flown)" | 2015 | Imagine: John Lennon 75th Birthday Concert |
| Rosanne Cash | "I'll Be Back" | 2018 | 38th Annual John Lennon Tribute |
| Shelby Lynne and Joan Osborne | "Julia" | 2012 | 32nd Annual John Lennon Tribute |
| Florence and the Machine | "All You Need Is Love" | 2015 | Live performance |
| Gábor Szabó | "Dear Prudence" | 1969 | 1969 |
| Gábor Szabó | "In My Life" | 1969 | 1969 |
| Leslie West | "Dear Prudence" | 1976 | The Leslie West Band |
| Willie Nile | "Dear Prudence" | 2018 | 38th Annual John Lennon Tribute |
| Doug Parkinson | "Dear Prudence" | 1969 | Doug Parkinson in Focus |
| Quinn Sullivan | "Dear Prudence" | 2023 | Live performance |
| Kenny Rankin | "Dear Prudence" | 1969 | Family |
| Chris Stapleton with Willie Nelson and Kris Kristofferson | "You've Got to Hide Your Love Away" | 2015 | Imagine: John Lennon 75th Birthday Concert |
| Chris Stapleton with Brandon Flowers and Sheryl Crow | "Don't Let Me Down" | 2015 | Imagine: John Lennon 75th Birthday Concert |
| Spoon | "Hey Bulldog" | 2015 | Imagine: John Lennon 75th Birthday Concert |
| Living Colour | "Tomorrow Never Knows" | 2003 | Collideøscope |
| The Milk Carton Kids | "I'm Only Sleeping" | 2016 | Howard Stern's Tribute to the Beatles’ ‘Revolver’ |
| Cheap Trick | "She Said She Said" | 2016 | Howard Stern's Tribute to the Beatles’ ‘Revolver’ |
| Joan Osborne | "Hey Bulldog" | 2010 | The 30th Annual John Lennon Tribute |
| The Jaded Hearts Club | "Hey Bulldog" | 2020 | Live at The 100 Club |
| Bill Deal & the Rhondels | "Hey Bulldog" | 1969 | Bill Deal and the Rhondels |
| Baltimoore | "Hey Bulldog" | 1989 | There Is No Danger On the Roof |
| Laurence Juber | "Hey Bulldog" | 2017 | LJ Can't Stop Playing the Beatles! |
| Van Duren | "Hey Bulldog" | 2006 | Fried Glass Onions Vol. 3 Memphis Rocks The Beatles |
| The Jaded Hearts Club | "Please Please Me" | 2020 | Live at The 100 Club |
| Keely Smith | "Please Please Me" | 1964 | Keely Smith Sings the John Lennon—Paul McCartney Songbook |
| The Punkles | "Please Please Me" | 2002 | Beat The Punkles |
| Miley Cyrus | "Help!" | 2020 | |
| Love Psychedelico | "Help!" | 2007 | Golden Grapefruit |
| Flamin' Groovies | "And Your Bird Can Sing" | 1999 | Sixteen Tunes |
| Fab Faux | "And Your Bird Can Sing" | 2009 | Live performance |
| Spanky & Our Gang | "And Your Bird Can Sing" | 1966 | And Your Bird Can Sing |
| I Fight Dragons | "And Your Bird Can Sing" | 2009 | Dragon Fight! I Fight Dragons Live At The Metro |
| Gov’t Mule | "And Your Bird Can Sing" | 2016 | Howard Stern's Tribute to the Beatles’ ‘Revolver’ |
| Wilco | "And Your Bird Can Sing" | 2013 | Live performance |
| Guadalcanal Diary | "And Your Bird Can Sing" | 1987 | 2×4 |
| David Lee Roth | "Tomorrow Never Knows" | 2003 | Diamond Dave |
| The Claypool Lennon Delirium | "Tomorrow Never Knows" | 2019 | Live performance |
| Juliet Prowse | "Tomorrow Never Knows" | 1970 | The Engelbert Humperdinck Show |
| Luciano Pavarotti | "All You Need Is Love" | 2000 | Pavarotti & Friends |
| Willie Nile | "Tomorrow Never Knows" | 2022 | 42nd Annual John Lennon Tribute |
| The Kennedys | "And Your Bird Can Sing" | 2010 | The 30th Annual John Lennon Tribute: Live from the Beacon Theatre, NYC |
| Alejandro Escovedo | "Help!" | 2010 | The 30th Annual John Lennon Tribute: Live from the Beacon Theatre, NYC |
| Johnny Rivers | "Run for Your Life" | 1966 | ...And I Know You Wanna Dance |
| Gary Lewis & the Playboys | "Run for Your Life" | 1966 | She's Just My Style |
| The Punkles | "I'm a Loser" | 2004 | Pistol |
| The Buckinghams | "I'm a Loser" | 1997 | Places in Five |
| Lost Dogs | "I'm a Loser" | 1993 | Little Red Riding Hood |
| Doug Kershaw | "I'm a Loser" | 1977 | Flip, Flop, and Fly |
| David Broza | "You've Got to Hide Your Love Away" | 2023 | 43rd Annual John Lennon Tribute |
| David Broza | "All You Need Is Love" | 2023 | 43rd Annual John Lennon Tribute |
| Lisa Fischer | "Come Together" | 2023 | 43rd Annual John Lennon Tribute |
| Rosanne Cash | "And Your Bird Can Sing" | 2023 | 43rd Annual John Lennon Tribute |
| The Kennedys | "Real Love" | 2023 | 43rd Annual John Lennon Tribute |
| The Kennedys | "Norwegian Wood (This Bird Has Flown)" | 2022 | 42nd Annual John Lennon Tribute |
| The Kennedys | "Nowhere Man" | 2022 | 42nd Annual John Lennon Tribute |
| Larry Campbell and Teresa Williams | "You've Got to Hide Your Love Away" | 2022 | 42nd Annual John Lennon Tribute |
| Larry Campbell and Teresa Williams | "And Your Bird Can Sing" | 2022 | 42nd Annual John Lennon Tribute |
| Leo Sayer | "Norwegian Wood (This Bird Has Flown)" | 2021 | Northern Songs |
| Ani DiFranco | "Run for Your Life" | 2021 | 41st Annual John Lennon Tribute |
| Ani DiFranco | "Help!" | 2021 | 41st Annual John Lennon Tribute |
| Raul Midón | "Dear Prudence" | 2021 | 41st Annual John Lennon Tribute |
| Joan Osborne | "Dig a Pony" | 2021 | 41st Annual John Lennon Tribute |
| Rich Pagano | "Happiness Is A Warm Gun" | 2021 | 41st Annual John Lennon Tribute |
| Bettye LaVette | "All You Need Is Love" | 2021 | 41st Annual John Lennon Tribute |
| Leo Sayer | "Across the Universe" | 2021 | Northern Songs |
| Hikaru Utada | "Across the Universe" | 2010 | Live performance |
| Hootie & The Blowfish | "The Ballad of John and Yoko" | 2019 | Cracked Rear View (The 25th anniversary edition) |
| Leo Sayer | "Girl" | 2021 | Northern Songs |
| Leo Sayer | "Nowhere Man" | 2021 | Northern Songs |
| Leo Sayer | "I Feel Fine" | 2021 | Northern Songs |
| Osamu Kitajima | "I Feel Fine" | 1989 | Sweet Chaos |
| Sweethearts of the Rodeo | "I Feel Fine" | 1988 | One Time, One Night |
| John Pizzarelli | "I Feel Fine" | 2012 | Double Exposure |
| Leo Sayer | "A Hard Day's Night" | 2021 | Northern Songs |
| Keely Smith | "A Hard Day's Night" | 1964 | Keely Smith Sings the John Lennon-Paul McCartney Songbook |
| The Kelly Family | "A Hard Day's Night" | 1992 | Street Life |
| Eddie Cano & Nino Tempo | "A Hard Day's Night" | 2003 | GLASS ONION: SONGS OF THE BEATLES |
| Elliott Smith | "I'll Be Back" | 2012 | Grand Mal: Studio Rarities |
| Wes Montgomery | "I'll Be Back" | 1968 | Road Song |
| Chad & Jeremy | "I'll Be Back" | 2010 | Live performance |
| Johnny Rivers | "I'll Be Back" | 2004 | Reinvention Highway |
| Leo Sayer | "Revolution" | 2021 | Northern Songs |
| Elliott Smith | "Revolution" | 2012 | Grand Mal Studio Rarities |
| Andy Timmons Band | "Lucy in the Sky With Diamonds" | 2011 | Andy Timmons Band Plays Sgt. Pepper |
| Ewa Bem | "Strawberry Fields Forever" | 1984 | Ewa Bem Loves The Beatles |
| Andy Timmons Band | "Strawberry Fields Forever" | 2011 | Andy Timmons Band Plays Sgt. Pepper |
| Rick Wakeman | "Strawberry Fields Forever" | 2018 | Piano Odyssey |
| Leo Sayer | "Strawberry Fields Forever" | 2021 | Northern Songs |
| The Real Group | "Strawberry Fields Forever" | 1996 | Live In Stockholm |
| The King's Singers | "Strawberry Fields Forever" | | Live performance |
| Gábor Szabó | "Lucy in the Sky With Diamonds" | 1968 | Wind, Sky and Diamonds |
| The Moffatts | "This Boy" | 1995 | The Moffatts |
| The Cactus Blossoms | "This Boy" | 2013 | Minnesota Beatle Project, Vol. 5 |
| Robson & Jerome | "This Boy" | 1995 | Robson & Jerome |
| Chris Cornell | "A Day In The Life" | 2018 | Chris Cornell |
| Gothenburg Symphony Orchestra | "A Day In The Life" | 2013 | Live performance |
| Andy Timmons Band | "A Day In The Life" | 2011 | Andy Timmons Band Plays Sgt. Pepper |
| Gábor Szabó | "A Day In The Life" | 1968 | Wind, Sky and Diamonds |
| Al Di Meola | "A Day In The Life" | 2013 | All Your Life: A Tribute to the Beatles |
| Brian Auger & The Trinity | "A Day In The Life" | 1968 | Definitely What! |
| Russian Red | "A Day In The Life" | | Live performance |
| Reba McEntire | "If I Fell" | 2001 | I'll Be |
| Nellie McKay | "If I Fell" | 2015 | My Weekly Reader |
| Al Di Meola | "If I Fell" | 2013 | All Your Life: A Tribute to the Beatles |
| Peter and Gordon | "If I Fell" | 1967 | Lady Godiva |
| Keely Smith | "If I Fell" | 1964 | Keely Smith Sings the John Lennon—Paul McCartney Songbook |
| Julian Lennon | "Day Tripper" | 1985 | Live performance |
| Billie Eilish | "Michelle" | 2025 | Live performance |
| The Surfrajettes | "She Loves You" | 2018 | Live performance |
| Ania | "Strawberry Fields Forever" | 2010 | Ania Movie |
| Keely Smith | "She Loves You" | 1964 | Keely Smith Sings the John Lennon—Paul McCartney Songbook |
| Keely Smith | "And I Love Her" | 1964 | Keely Smith Sings the John Lennon—Paul McCartney Songbook |
| Keely Smith | "All My Loving" | 1964 | Keely Smith Sings the John Lennon—Paul McCartney Songbook |
| Keely Smith | "I Want to Hold Your Hand" | 1964 | Keely Smith Sings the John Lennon—Paul McCartney Songbook |
| Keely Smith | "Can't Buy Me Love" | 1964 | Keely Smith Sings the John Lennon—Paul McCartney Songbook |
| Keely Smith | "Do You Want to Know a Secret" | 1964 | Keely Smith Sings the John Lennon—Paul McCartney Songbook |
| Keely Smith | "A World Without Love" | 1964 | Keely Smith Sings the John Lennon—Paul McCartney Songbook |
| Keely Smith | "P.S. I Love You" | 1964 | Keely Smith Sings the John Lennon—Paul McCartney Songbook |
| Liam Gallagher | "Cry Baby Cry" | 2020 | Live performance |
| Commander Cody and His Lost Planet Airmen | "Cry Baby Cry" | 1987 | Flying Dreams |
| Samiam | "Cry Baby Cry" | 1997 | You Are Freaking Me Out |
| Throwing Muses | "Cry Baby Cry" | 1992 | Red Heaven |
| Adam Levine and Jesse Carmichael | "Don't Let Me Down" | 2022 | The Howard Stern Show |
| Ben E. King | "Don't Let Me Down" | 1970 | Rough Edges |
| Annie Lennox | "Don't Let Me Down" | 1992 | Walking on Broken Glass |
| Lake Street Dive and Eilen Jewell | "Don't Let Me Down" | 2014 | Live performance |
| Lucky Chops | "Don't Let Me Down" | 2023 | |
| Steve Earle | "Cry Baby Cry" | 2013 | 33rd Annual John Lennon Tribute |
| Fats Domino | "Everybody's Got Something to Hide Except Me and My Monkey" | 1969 | |
| Larry Harlow | "Everybody's Got Something to Hide Except Me and My Monkey" | 1969 | Me and My Monkey |
| My Brightest Diamond | "Everybody's Got Something to Hide Except Me and My Monkey" | 2008 | The White Album Recovered |
| Linda Ronstadt | "Good Night" | 1996 | Dedicated to the One I Love |
| Caroline Henderson | "Good Night" | 2008 | Live The White Concert |
| Robert Gordon | "Run for Your Life" | 1998 | The Lost Album, Plus... |
| Alice Cooper with Johnny Depp | "Revolution" | 2012 | Live performance |
| Soundgarden | "I Want You (She's So Heavy)" | 1995 | Live performance |
| Ween | "She Said, She Said" | 1987 | Ween II (Axis: Bold as Boognish) |
| The Fevers | "The Ballad of John and Yoko" | 1968 | The Fevers vol.III |
| Ofra Harnoy | "Free as a Bird" | 1996 | Imagine |
| Ofra Harnoy | "Hey Jude" | 1996 | Imagine |
| Haley Reinhart ＆ Casey Abrams | "Free as a Bird" | 2020 | |
| Rogerio Skylab | "Revolution 9" | 2008 | Branco, Vol. 2 (A Beatles '68 Tribute) |
| Def FX | "Revolution 9" | 1996 | Majick |
| The Neil Cowley Trio | "Revolution 9" | 2012 | Mojo magazine. |
| Rosalie Cunningham | "Strawberry Fields Forever" | 2017 | |
| The Unthanks | "Sexy Sadie" | 2009 | |
| Lee Rocker | "I'll Cry Instead" | 2012 | Hot n' Greasy, Vol. 1 |
| Kelly Clarkson | "Come Together" | 2024 | The Kelly Clarkson Show |
| Foo Fighters Feat. Joe Perry and Liam Gallagher | "Come Together" | 2017 | Live performance |
| The Castellows | "Come Together" | 2024 | Live performance |
| Yes Sir Boss feat. Joss Stone | "Come Together" | 2012 | Live performance |
| Jake Shimabukuro | "All You Need Is Love" | 2021 | Jake & Friends |
| The Pretenders | "Not a Second Time" | 2006 | Pirate Radio |
| R. Stevie Moore | "Not a Second Time" | 1978 | The North |
| Five Man Electrical Band | "You're Going To Lose That Girl" | 1969 | Five Man Electrical Band |
| The Cryan' Shames | "You're Going To Lose That Girl" | 1967 | |
| Gene Simmons | "You're Going To Lose That Girl" | 2017 | Live performance |
| Realm | "Eleanor Rigby" | 1988 | Endless War |
| The Quick | "It Won't Be Long" | 1976 | Mondo Deco |
| RC Succession | "Help!" | 1988 | COBRA IN TROUBLE |
| Southern All Stars | "Help!" | 2015 | Live performance |
| Letters from the Fire | "Eleanor Rigby" | 2014 | Letters from the Fire - EP |

== See also ==
- List of songs covered by The Beatles
