= Tributes to the Beatles =

Tributes to English rock band

The Beatles were originally a quartet, but only Paul McCartney and Ringo Starr remain.

John Lennon was murdered in December 1980 and George Harrison died of lung cancer in 2001. There have been numerous tributes to both.

== The Beatles ==
During the mid 1960s, Beatlemania was an unprecedented global phenomenon, and two songs devoted to them reached the charts: "We Love You Beatles" by The Carefrees (#39) and "A Letter to the Beatles" by The Four Preps (#85).

Over the years, many other songs mention the group in their lyrics:

- The Police – "Born In the 50s"
- The House of Love – "The Beatles and the Stones"
- Run-DMC – "King of Rock"
- The Who – "The Seeker"
- Jellyfish – "All I Want is Everything"
- The Clash – "1977"
- The Dream Academy – "Life in a Northern Town"
- Leonardo Favio – "Ding Dong, Ding Dong, Estas Cosas del Amor"
- Billy Joel – "All You Wanna Do Is Dance"
- Marie Laforêt – "Il a neigé sur Yesterday"

The Beatles have inspired a number of tribute acts and theatrical productions; among them are the American Beatles tribute band Rain (originally Reign), which evolved into the stage production Rain: A Tribute to the Beatles; California tribute The Fab Four, British tribute The Bootleg Beatles, American tribute 1964: The Tribute, Dutch tribute The Analogues, the Cirque du Soleil stage production Love, which utilizes music from an accompanying 2006 remix album of the same name produced by George Martin and his son Giles Martin; and the Japanese tribute band the Parrots, whom in 2013 McCartney booked for and played alongside at a birthday party for his wife Nancy Shevell.

== John Lennon ==
On December 8, 1980, Lennon was murdered in New York City. After his death, a crowd gathered in mourning to pay tribute to him in ten minutes of silence as requested by his widow, Yoko Ono.

=== Posthumous recognition ===
Lennon has been the subject of numerous posthumous awards. His album Double Fantasy was awarded a 1982 Grammy Award for Album of the Year and a 1982 Brit Award for outstanding contribution to music. Rolling Stone magazine ranked Lennon in sixth place in a countdown of the greatest artists of all time, and Lennon's song "Imagine" was voted the third greatest song of all time. Several posthumous compilation albums have been released, such as Lennon Legend and Working Class Hero: The Definitive Lennon.

=== Concerts and albums ===
==== Instant Karma: The Campaign to Save Darfur ====
In 2006, a selection of modern recording artists released versions of Lennon's songs on a charitable album called Instant Karma: The Amnesty International Campaign to Save Darfur, named after a John Lennon song. Performers included U2, Lenny Kravitz, The Cure, Green Day, R.E.M., Christina Aguilera, Duran Duran, and The Black Eyed Peas, among others. U2 recorded the title track.

=== Songs ===
==== "All Those Years Ago" ====
George Harrison had written "All Those Years ago" before the death of Lennon. The lyrics were originally different, however; upon hearing the news of Lennon's death, Harrison changed the lyrics and rewrote the song as a tribute to Lennon. Surviving Beatles, Ringo Starr and Paul McCartney, along with McCartney's wife Linda and Wings member Denny Laine, contributed to the recording.

==== "Here Today" ====
McCartney recorded his own personal tribute to Lennon, titled "Here Today," on his 1982 album, Tug of War. McCartney had been affected by Lennon's death to the extent that he became reluctant about touring.

==== "Life Is Real (Song for Lennon)" ====
Freddie Mercury of Queen wrote "Life Is Real" as a tribute to Lennon. The title may be a reference to the lyric 'love is real', from Lennon's 1970 song "Love", or the line 'nothing is real', from The Beatles' "Strawberry Fields Forever".

==== "Hey John" ====
The GDR rock band Die Puhdys dedicated Lennon their song "Hey John", performed and recorded in 1981. The band describes their fan feelings about John Lennon, especially to his song "Give Peace a Chance". The song contains Lennon samples from "Give Peace a Chance" and "Imagine".

==== "Roll On John" ====
Bob Dylan wrote "Roll On John" as a tribute to Lennon on his 2012 album entitled Tempest.

==== "Empty Garden (Hey, Hey Johnny)" ====
Elton John wrote "Empty Garden (Hey, Hey Johnny)" for Lennon, a dedication for Lennon to show a love for their friendship. Elton John titled it "Empty Garden," as Lennon told him stories how he was going to create a garden outside of The Dakota, which was the building where Lennon lived, and how he never was able to grow it as he was shot by a crazed fan outside of his home in 1980.

==== "The Late Great Johnny Ace" ====
Paul Simon wrote this song about both the fifties singer Johnny Ace and John Lennon in 1981. It was first performed for the concert in Central Park in 1981, as seen in the film, but not included on the album. It was finally released on his 1982 album "Hearts and Bones".

== George Harrison ==
George Harrison died from lung cancer on 29 November 2001. Tributes were performed by some of the most well known musicians of the time.

=== Posthumous recognition ===
A year after Harrison's death, his final album, Brainwashed, was released. The Dark Horse Years 1976–1992, a compilation set of a selection of his albums, was released in 2004. Harrison was voted the 21st greatest Guitarist of all time by Rolling Stone magazine and was inducted into the Rock and Roll Hall of Fame in 2004. Film director Martin Scorsese directed a feature-length documentary about Harrison's life, George Harrison: Living in the Material World (2011).

=== Concerts and albums ===
==== Concert for George ====
A year after his death Harrison's friends commemorated him in a tribute concert held at the Royal Albert Hall. The show featured musicians Ravi Shankar, Eric Clapton, Jeff Lynne, Ringo Starr, Tom Petty, and Paul McCartney among others. Harrison's son Dhani performed, playing the guitar. Jim Keltner, a session drummer who had played with Harrison in the Traveling Wilburys, also appeared.

=== Songs ===
==== "Never Without You" ====
Ringo Starr wrote and recorded a tribute song to Harrison titled "Never Without You", released on Ringo Rama in 2003.

== See also ==
- The Beatles in film
- The Beatles in popular culture
