= Graham Alexander (album) =

Studio album by Graham Alexander
- Released: December 28, 2011
- Recorded: 2009–2011
- Studios: Lair Studio 1, Lair Studio (Perkins Dairy), Studio 4, The Studio, Philadelphia
- Genres: Pop; rock; funk; soul
- Length: 31:13
- Labels: self-released, ThisTime Records (Japan)
- Producers: Graham Alexander, Fran Smith Jr., Andy Kravitz

Graham Alexander chronology
Graham Alexander (2011)	Repeat Deceiver (2014)

Graham Alexander is the debut album by the American singer-songwriter Graham Alexander, self-released on December 28, 2011. It was released in Japan on ThisTime Records in 2013. Recording sessions for the album took place at several locations from 2009 to 2011. The album's production was credited to songwriter Graham Alexander, Fran Smith Jr., and Andy Kravitz. Spotify's top 100 songs chosen by fans playlist included the first single from the album "Biggest Fan" at No. 6 in its 2011 list.

== Background ==
Before joining the Broadway show, Rain, Alexander built a following with his band, The Roadrunners and developed a following in the New York City and Philadelphia areas. Members of the Philadelphia rock band, The Hooters, joined in the recording sessions. Andy Kravitz, a Grammy award-winning producer, were enlisted to drum as well as produce. Arthur Barrow, a member of Frank Zappa's band added bass to "Hang Around". The record was mastered at Sterling Sound in NYC.

== Track listing ==
No.	Title	Writer(s)	Length
1.	"Don't Give in Tonight"	Graham Alexander; Adam Belling	3:11
2.	"Biggest Fan"	Graham Alexander; Kravitz	2:51
3.	"Only Fools Rush In"	Alexander	3:12
4.	"Paralyzed"	Alexander	3:41
5.	"The Light That Guides You Home"	Alexander	2:19
6.	"Replace Me"	Graham Alexander; Fran Smith Jr.	2:42
7.	"World Without You"	Alexander	2:41
8.	"Hang Around"	Alexander	3:08
9.	"Have A Good Life"	Graham Alexander; Fran Smith Jr.; Edwards	4:20
10.	"On The Outside Looking In"	Graham Alexander; Zach Harski; Joe Nocco	4:28

2013 Japan Release bonus tracks

"Time To Let It Go" – 3:40
1. "Cursed with the Faith of a Child" – 3:31
2. "You've Got To Make Up Your Mind" – 2:42
3. "Baby Let Me Follow You Down" (Traditional arr. Alexander) – 3:41

Spotify bonus tracks

"Remembering Talking All Night" – 2:06
1. "You've Got To Make Up Your Mind" – 2:42
2. "Long Way Home" – 3:40

== Personnel ==
- Graham Alexander – electric guitar (all songs except 5, 7), acoustic guitar (1, 4, 5, 6, 7, 9), piano (2, 3, 4, 9, 10) bass (all songs except 2 and 9), organ (1), guitar solo (4), trumpet (3, 4), clarinet (4), mandolin (5), keyboards (4, 6), percussion (all songs except 3, 8, 9), horn arrangement, string arrangement, assistant engineer
- Zach Harski – guitar solo (1), electric guitar (all songs except 5, 7, 9), acoustic guitar (3, 7, 9), saxophone (3, 4, 8), mandolin (5), backing vocals (6, 8, 10), percussion (6, 10), horn arrangement, string arrangement, assistant engineer
- Fran Smith Jr. – bass (2), backing vocal (4)
- Eric Bazilian – guitar (9), hurdy gurdy (7)
- Rob Hyman – piano solo (3)
- Ally Jenkins – violin – (9)
- Kaitlyn Raitz – cello – (9)
- Andy Kravitz – drums (all songs except 7), percussion (7), engineer
- Teresa McCann – backing vocals (2, 8, 9, 10 ), piano (7), keyboards (7, 8)
- Adam Belling – percussion (1, 5, 6), assistant engineer
- John Forster – percussion (1, 5, 10), assistant engineer
- Colin Newell – trombone, trumpet (3)
- Arthur Barrow – bass (8), clavinet (8)
- Dr. Dave Appleby – electric guitar (8)
- String and Horn arrangements – Graham Alexander and Zach Harski
- Ryan Moys – engineer (4, 9)
- Tom Coyne – mastering
- Plink Giglio – mastering, engineer (4)
- Kelsey Larzelere – assistant engineer
