= The Linda McCartney Story =

- U.S. promotional poster
- Written by: Christine Berardo
- Directed by: Armand Mastroianni
- Starring: Elizabeth Mitchell; Gary Bakewell; David Lewis; Nicole Oliver
- Music by: J. Peter Robinson
- Country of origin: United States
- Original language: English

Production
- Producers: Barnet Bain; Stephen Deutsch; Darren Frankel; Tom Patricia; Jacobus Rose
- Cinematography: David Burr
- Editor: Terry Blythe
- Running time: 120 minutes
- Production companies: Metafilmics; Mandalay Television; Lions Gate Television; Columbia TriStar Television

Original release
- Network: CBS
- Release: May 21, 2000

The Linda McCartney Story is a 2000 British-American drama television film directed by Armand Mastroianni, starring Elizabeth Mitchell and Gary Bakewell who reprises his role from Backbeat. Based on the book Linda McCartney: The Biography, presenting the life story of Linda McCartney and her romance and marriage to Beatles member Paul McCartney. The film was shot in Vancouver, British Columbia, Canada, and premiered on CBS on May 21, 2000.

== Cast ==
- Elizabeth Mitchell as Linda McCartney
- Gary Bakewell as Paul McCartney
- David Lewis as Danny Field
- Nicole Oliver as Felicia
- Tim Piper as John Lennon
- Matthew Harrison as Mick Jagger
- Claude Duhamel as Keith Richards
- Aaron Grain as Jim Morrison
- George Segal as Lee Eastman
- Jodelle Ferland as Heather

== Soundtrack ==
Song	Written by	Performed by
I Want to Hold Your Hand	John Lennon and Paul McCartney	The Fab Four (Ron McNeil, Rolo Sandoval, Michael Amador, and Ardy Sarraf)
Please Please Me	John Lennon and Paul McCartney	The Fab Four
Kansas City	Jerry Leiber and Mike Stoller	The Fab Four
Yeh Yeh	Rodgers Grant, Jon Hendricks & Pat Patrick	Georgie Fame and the Blue Flames
Back Door Man	Willie Dixon	Peace Frog
