= Repeat Deceiver =

Studio album by Graham Alexander
- Released: December 19, 2014
- Recorded: 2013–2014
- Studios: Victor Studios, Studio 4 West
- Genres: Pop; rock; funk; soul
- Length: 31:26
- Label: Victrola
- Producer: Graham Alexander

Graham Alexander chronology
Graham Alexander (2011)	Repeat Deceiver (2014)

Repeat Deceiver is the second album by the American singer-songwriter Graham Alexander, released on December 19, 2014, by Victor Talking Machine Company. Recording sessions for the album took place at several locations from 2013 to 2014. The album's production was credited to songwriter Graham Alexander.

== Background ==
After the release of his debut album Graham Alexander in December 2011, Alexander and his band embarked on a tour throughout 2012 and 2013, including stops at the Abbey Road on the River Festival, the Black Potato Music Festival, Non-COMMvention, Quick Chek Festival of Ballooning, and Musikfest. Graham Alexander started performing in his second Broadway show, Let It Be during the recording of his second album.

== Track listing ==
No.	Title	Writer(s)	Length
1.	"Repeat Deceiver"	Graham Alexander	3:01
2.	"Romeo Blue"	Alexander; Zach Harski	3:28
3.	"Games"	Alexander	3:48
4.	"She's A Chameleon"	Alexander	3:39
5.	"Two Ships (Passing in the Night)"	Alexander	3:41
6.	"Third Wheel"	Alexander; Harski	3:04
7.	"American Au Pair in Paris"	Alexander	3:08
8.	"People Are Only Sorry When They're Caught"	Alexander	2:57
9.	"Total Cartography"	Alexander	2:54
10.	"Wait in the Rain"	Alexander	3:46

== Personnel ==
- Graham Alexander – electric guitar, acoustic guitar, acoustic 12 string (1, 4, 5, 7, 8, 9, 10), piano (3, 5, 9), bass, 6 string bass, mandocello (5), string arrangements (2, 3, 6), drums (5), lead guitar (2, 7), synths, percussion
- Zach Harski – lead guitar (1, 2, 3, 4, 7, 8, 9, 10), piano (1), organ (1, 6, 8), bass on (6), backing vocals (1, 2, 4, 9, 10), strings arrangements (2, 3, 6), handclaps, mandolin (10)
- Fran Smith Jr. – bass, backing vocals
- Mike Crawford – drums on (6, 8)
- Ben Barclay – bass (8), backing vocals (10)
- Rob Fini – piano (8), backing vocals (2, 3, 5, 7, 10)
- Ally Jenkins – violin, string arrangements (2, 3, 5, 6)
- Jay Davidson – tenor and baritone saxophones (4, 6) horn arrangements, sax solo (6)
- Adam Flicker – trumpet (4, 6)
- John Forster – percussion, handclaps
- Dr. Dave Appleby – backing vocals (10)
