= Gary Bakewell =

British television actor

Gary Bakewell (born December 1968) is a Scottish television actor who is best known for his role as Paul McCartney in the film Backbeat.

As well as twice portraying Paul McCartney (in Backbeat and The Linda McCartney Story) he has appeared in a number of television series including Chef!, Doctors and Spooks.

Gary starred in Neverwhere, the 1996 BBC TV fantasy series written by Neil Gaiman, playing the lead character, Richard Mayhew.

He appears in the Gallifrey series of audio dramas, spin-offs of the television series Doctor Who by Big Finish Productions. He has also been in movies such as Man and Boy (2002 film).

Bakewell has done work as a voice-over artist and has worked as an Audio Describer.
