= Neverwhere =

British television series

- DVD cover
- Genre: Adventure; Comedy-drama; Urban fantasy
- Created by: Neil Gaiman; Lenny Henry
- Starring: Gary Bakewell; Laura Fraser; Hywel Bennett; Clive Russell; Paterson Joseph; Trevor Peacock; Elizabeth Marmur; Tanya Moodie; Peter Capaldi; Earl Cameron
- Composer: Brian Eno
- Country of origin: United Kingdom
- Original language: English
- No. of episodes: 6

Production
- Running time: 30 minutes

Original release
- Network: BBC 2
- Release: 12 September – 17 October 1996

Neverwhere is an urban fantasy television six-part drama by Neil Gaiman that first aired in 1996 on BBC2. The series is set in "London Below", a magical realm coexisting with the more familiar London, referred to as "London Above". It was devised by Neil Gaiman and Lenny Henry and directed by Dewi Humphreys. Gaiman adapted the series into a novel, which was released in September 1996. The series and book were partially inspired by Gene Wolfe's novel Free Live Free.

== Plot ==
Richard Mayhew, a Scottish man living in London, encounters an injured girl named Door on the street one night. Despite his fiancée's protests, he decides to help her; upon doing so he ceases to exist on Earth and becomes real only to the denizens of "London Below", whose inhabitants are generally invisible and non-existent to the people of "London Above". He loses his flat, his job, and nearly his mind as he travels to London Below to make sense of it all, find a way back, and help Door survive as she is hunted by assassins.

In London Below, the various familiar names of London all take on a new significance, Knightsbridge becomes "Night's Bridge", a stone bridge whose darkness takes its toll in human life; The Angel, Islington is an angel. London Below is a parallel world in and beneath the sewers. Its inhabitants are the homeless and people from other times, such as Roman legionaries and medieval monks, as well as fictional and fantastical characters.

== Characters and cast ==
- Richard Mayhew (Gary Bakewell) – a young businessman, who discovers the world of London Below one day after helping the injured Door recover in his flat.
- Door (Laura Fraser) – a young woman from London Below, the daughter of a noble family who were all murdered shortly before the beginning of the story. She possesses her family's innate ability to "open" things (and not just doors).
- Mr Croup (Hywel Bennett) – the talkative half of the pair of assassins. He is short, fat, and speaks in a pompous and verbose manner. Like his partner, Mr Vandemar, he seems to be able to simply move from one place to another very quickly despite his ungainly appearance. He is the brains of the pair and seems to be the one calling the shots, and he apparently has a taste (literally) for fine china. Much of the imagery used to describe him is that of a fox.
- Mr Vandemar (Clive Russell) – dull-witted, tall, and gangly, Vandemar is Croup's polar opposite. He does not speak much, and when he does, his statements are often laconic and blunt. He is quite brutish and seems to enjoy nothing more than killing and destroying things (even practising his golf swing with live toads). He also has a tendency to eat live animals. The descriptive imagery likens him to a hound or a wolf, and he even howls at one point when catching up with his mark.
- The Marquis de Carabas (Paterson Joseph) – The Marquis is arrogant, cunning, and very self-confident. Though very much the trickster, he is a loyal friend of Door and her family. This character was inspired by Puss in Boots, in which the cat invokes a fictional character of this name. Gaiman stated this as the starting point for the character, and imagining "Who would own a cat like this?"
- The Angel Islington (Peter Capaldi) – an angel dwelling in the sewers of London Below. Its duty is to watch over London Below, though (or maybe because) it failed at its previous task: guarding the city of Atlantis.
- Hunter (Tanya Moodie) – a warrior of London Below; her feats are legendary. Her lifelong obsession is to slay the great Beast of London. The imagery used to describe her likens her to a lioness.
- Old Bailey (Trevor Peacock) – an old friend of the Marquis, he keeps the company of pigeons on the rooftops and wears clothing made of feathers. He became indebted to the Marquis long ago, and so is charged with keeping a portion of his life safe for him.
- Lamia (Tamsin Greig) – the leader of a group of vampire-like seductresses, dressed in dark velvet, who "suck the warmth" from their victims.
- The Earl (Freddie Jones) – the leader of Earl's Court, an Underground train in London Below, who also holds a grudge against the Marquis.
- The Abbott (Earl Cameron) – the leader of a group of armed black friars guarding a special key at Blackfriars.
- Anaesthesia (Amy Marston) – a young member of the Rat-speakers group who accompanies Richard when he first arrives in London Below.

== Episodes ==
Neverwhere was first broadcast on BBC Two from 12 September 1996. There are six half-hour episodes:

No.	Title	Original release date
1	"Door"	11 September 1996
2	"Knightsbridge"	19 November 1996
3	"Earl's Court to Islington"	26 September 1996
4	"Blackfriars"	3 October 1996
5	"Down Street"	10 October 1996
6	"As Above, So Below"	17 October 1996

== Background ==
The idea for the story came from a conversation between Gaiman and Henry about a possible television series. Henry suggested a story with tribes of homeless people in London. Gaiman was initially reluctant to commit, as he feared that making the homeless appear "cool" might cause more young people to attempt to emulate the characters, but decided that the effect could be avoided by making the story more removed from reality.

Neverwhere received some criticism for its appearance. One major problem lay in the original plan to shoot on video (for budgetary reasons), and then later "filmise" the footage to make it look as if it had been shot on film. For this reason, the programme had been lit and shot in a manner appropriate to a film-based production, but the decision to apply the filmisation process was later reversed. In addition to what some considered the old-fashioned appearance of un-filmised video, the lighting set up with film in mind appeared garish and unsubtle on the more clinical medium. Gaiman himself commented that the loss of quality resulting from multi-generational VHS copies actually improved the appearance in this respect.

== Production ==
=== Locations ===
- Abbey Mills Pumping Station was used as the Angel Islington's lair.
- The scene where Richard meets Old Bailey was filmed on the roof of the Midland Grand Hotel at St Pancras railway station. The hotel interior was also used as "Down Street".
- The exteriors for the first Market were filmed at Battersea Power Station, though a different location was used for the interiors. HMS Belfast was the scene of the second Market.
- The scene where Richard saves a man from suicide was filmed on the Albert Bridge.
- The scenes where Croup and Vandemar capture the Marquis and where Richard bids farewell to Door and London Below were filmed at the abandoned Crystal Palace station.

== DVD releases ==
After a two-cassette VHS video release, the six episodes were released in the US and Canada to DVD as a two-disc set in September 2003 in conjunction with A&E Network. Despite the DVDs often being advertised as region 1, some of the actual discs are region zero. The BBC released the series on DVD on 23 April 2007. The opening theme tune on the original BBC2 transmission was the same as the music over the closing credits. The opening theme on the Region 2 DVD version is a series of abstract sounds, while the closing music remains intact. The music for the series was made by Brian Eno.

== Adaptations ==
=== Novelisation ===
Neil Gaiman wrote a novelisation of the television series that was first released in 1996, during the television show's transmission. This was accompanied by a spoken word release on CD and cassette. The text was later re-written for the US market (Gaiman's publisher insisting that many of the references of London were too obscure for US tastes) and a third version is now available which combines elements of both earlier versions of the novel.

=== Graphic novel ===
A nine-issue graphic novel limited series began in June 2005, written by Mike Carey (who had worked on Lucifer, a spin-off from Gaiman's The Sandman), with art by Glenn Fabry. Vertigo changed a character, the Marquis De Carabas, that had been portrayed in the TV series and on the radio as a man from the African Diaspora into a creature with a black skin tone not seen in the real world. The comic is an adaptation inspired by the novelisation, rather than the original TV series. Thus the characters and settings do not generally resemble those seen in the series. The series was published by DC Comics's Vertigo imprint. The collected volume was also published by Vertigo, in February 2007 (ISBN 1-4012-1007-4).

=== Stage ===
In 2006, a world-premiere stage adaptation of the novel, developed by writer and actress Eve Butler and director Sasha Travis, was produced by the Savannah Actor's Theatre in Savannah, Georgia. In 2008, a stage adaptation of the novel was created and performed by the Actors Gymnasium in Evanston, Illinois. In 2010, Lifeline Theatre in Chicago performed an adaptation written by Robert Kauzlaric. The eight-week run proved so successful that it was extended another four weeks. The play was viewed by Neil Gaiman and the co-creator of the original BBC series, Lenny Henry, during the extension. In February 2012, Calgary-based theatre company Mob Hit Productions performed a two-week run of Kauzlaric's adaptation. In May 2011, the first school production of Kauzlaric's adaptation was performed at Northwest Academy in Portland, Oregon. In February 2013, Kauzlaric's adaption was performed at Friends Academy in Locust Valley, New York. On 5 April 2013, the Sacred Fools Theater Company in Los Angeles performed the American West Coast premiere of Kauzlaric's adaptation. Originally scheduled to run through 11 May, it was extended an additional two weeks due to its popularity. The play was viewed by Neil Gaiman. In August 2013, Washington, D.C.–based company Rorschach Theatre performed Kauzlaric's adaptation after a successful Kickstarter campaign.

=== Film ===
A script was written for a film version in 2009 and was optioned by The Weinstein Company. The project has been abandoned since.

=== Radio ===
A radio dramatisation in six parts was first broadcast on BBC Radio 4 and BBC Radio 4 Extra in March 2013, written by Dirk Maggs and co-directed with producer Heather Larmour. During one of his book signings Gaiman indicated that it would be released for sale in late 2013. The radio play starred James McAvoy as Richard Mayhew and Natalie Dormer as Lady Door.

== Sequels ==
Since at least 2014, Gaiman said a sequel to the book titled The Seven Sisters was a possibility, later confirming in 2017 that he was in fact writing it.

"How the Marquis Got His Coat Back" is a short story written by Neil Gaiman and set in the Neverwhere universe. It was published in Rogues, a short story anthology edited by Gardner Dozois and George RR Martin. Audible adapted it as an audio story as well.

== See also ==
- List of films about angels
- Undone, a radio series featuring a number of parallel universe versions of London between which the protagonists may pass by means of hidden "gaps". It was described by one of its authors as "a kind of comic Neverwhere".
