= Ron McNeil (musician) =

American musician and singer-songwriter

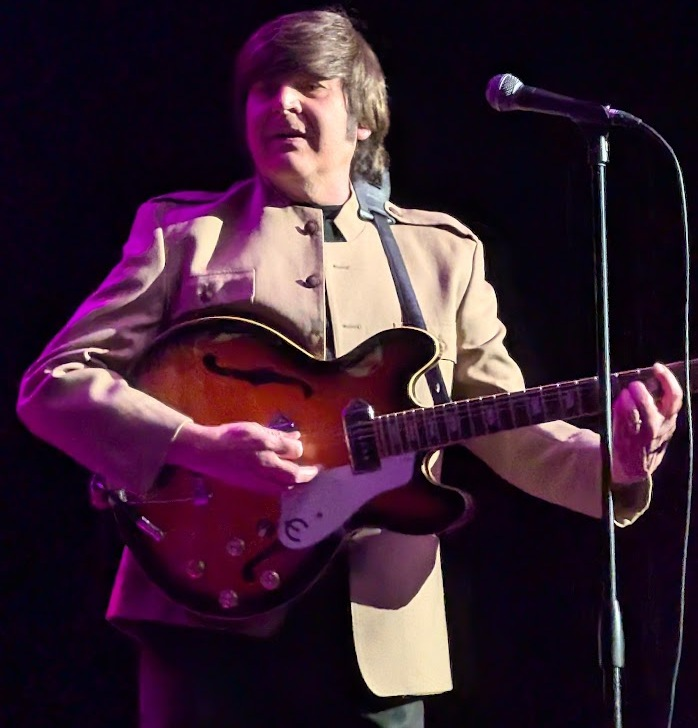
- McNeil in 2026
- Occupations: Singer; songwriter; musician; actor; musical director; writer; vocalist
- Known for: The Fab Four; The Monkee Men

Ron McNeil is an American singer-songwriter, musician, actor, musical director, writer, and vocalist. He is best known for being the co-founder of The Fab Four, a California tribute band dedicated to the Beatles, and The Monkee Men, a tribute band dedicated to The Monkees. He impersonates John Lennon.

== Early life and childhood ==
In his early childhood, McNeil would often spend time in his house watching episodes of The Monkees, and would sometimes go around the house singing their theme song. He often listened and "borrowed" some of his older sisters' records of the Beatles, he once recalled the first song he listened to was "I Saw Her Standing There".

=== Beatlemania performance and inspiration ===
When he was thirteen, his father took him to a performance of Beatlemania in Los Angeles, and he mentioned in an interview that he was inspired by that to form a Beatles tribute band. He also mentioned in another interview that after seeing Beatlemania he went to see Rain: A Tribute to the Beatles, in which he was interested. Shortly after, his father brought him a guitar (which was imported from Mexico) and keyboard, and McNeil learned to play them all by ear. Realizing this, his parents later brought him an organ. McNeil later brought his first John Lennon guitar in 1992.

== Career ==
=== Imagine: A Tribute to The Beatles ===
In early 1992, McNeil and his friends Stu Forman (George) and Neil Burg (Ringo), formed a Beatles tribute band called "Imagine: A Tribute to The Beatles". They recorded a demo cassette tape playing Love Me Do, Please Please Me, and I Feel Fine with McNeil doing the John and Paul parts. They would later recruit Robert "Mac" Ruffing (who is now in 1964 the Tribute) as Paul. Their first gig was at Cheers Entertainment, Simi Valley on September 6, 1992.

=== The Fab Four ===
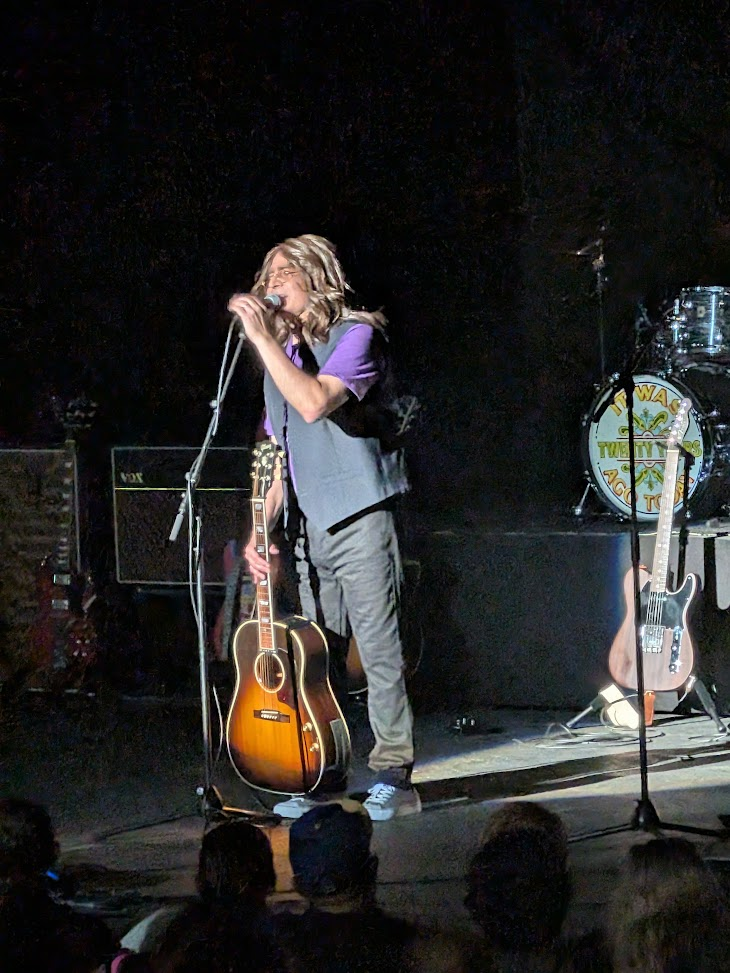
McNeil portraying John Lennon during a Fab Four show at the Pacific Amphitheatre in Costa Mesa, California in August 2026.

In the late 1980s to early 1990s, McNeil had the idea of forming The Fab Four after he and fellow musician Rolo Sandoval noticed Paul McCartney impersonator Ardavan Sarraf singing McCartney's Coming Up and winning the prize money at a sound-alike competition at The Fest for Beatles Fans (formerly Beatlesfest) in Los Angeles. The year prior, McNeil performed Lennon's song Imagine at the competition. McNeil said that "He sounded so much like Paul my hair stood up on the back of my neck". McNeil later got Sarraf's number and phoned him about his idea, in which Sarraf at first declined. However, after many conversations, Sarraf eventually agreed, leaving to McNeil co-founding the Fab Four with Sarraf, Sandoval, and Michael Amador in 1997. Before then, most of the original members, including McNeil, were in separate Beatles tribute bands.

In March 2018, McNeil announced his retirement from the Fab Four. He stated "After 25 years, I want to be home a little more. But I'm still president of the company, and everybody who started this with me are still my business partners, even though only Ardy's still on stage. So it'll be carrying on, which is great." He endorsed Newcastle-born Adam Hastings (originally from the Bootleg Beatles) as his replacement at the City National Grove of Anaheim in November 23rd, though McNeil comes back to perform whenever Hastings is unavailable.

=== The Monkee Men ===
According to various interviews during the pandemic, McNeil stated he wanted to form a tribute band that was interactive to the audience and that he was a fan of The Monkees. He then created The Monkee Men in 2022, a tribute band dedicated to The Monkees. McNeil then contacted his friends and fellow Fab Four musicians Jon Fickes, Doug Couture, Joshua Jones, and his brother Frankee Mendonça and asked them if they could join his band, which they eventually agreed to. He also contacted original Monkees member Micky Dolenz about the idea, in which Dolenz gave him "his full blessing" according to McNeil in an interview in August 2023. The band first performed at the Starlight Bowl in Burbank, California on July 22, 2023, opening for The Fab Four, with McNeil seen performing as "the Fifth Monkee", as most of The Monkees' songs require more than four musicians.

== Credits ==
=== Stage ===
- Fab Four Mania (2005–2008) - John Lennon
- Rutlemania (2007) – Ron Nasty, also musical director
- 50 Summers of Love (2017) – John Lennon, also musical director

=== Video games ===
- The Beatles: Rock Band (2009) – Motion capture for John Lennon

=== Television ===
- The Fab Four: The Ultimate Tribute (2012) – John Lennon, also writer
- The World's Greatest Tribute Bands (2012 and 2017) – John Lennon, Denny Laine (2014)

=== Film ===
- Yellow Submarine (2012; cancelled) – Motion capture for John Lennon
