= 1964 the Tribute =

US Beatles tribute band

1964 The Tribute
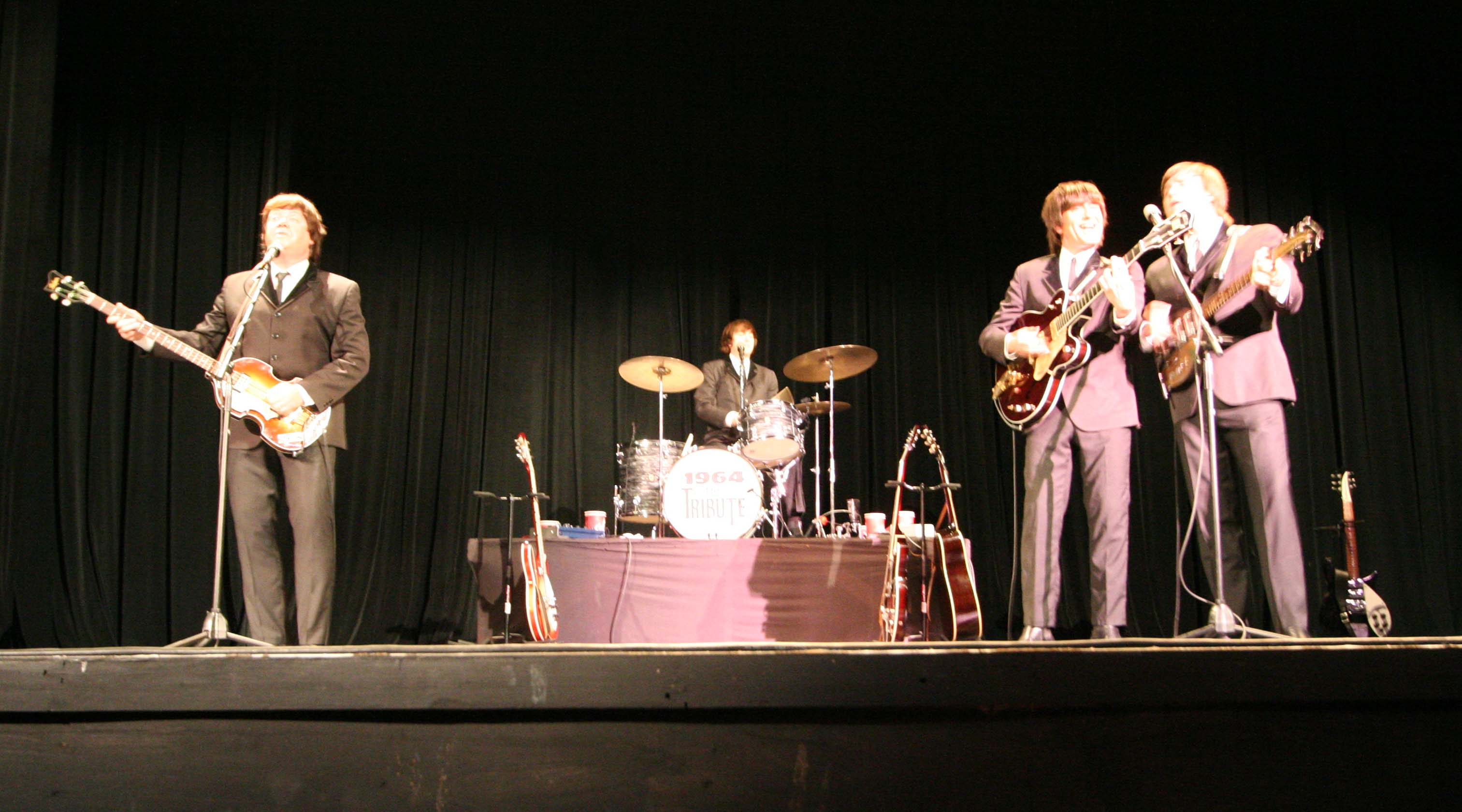

Background information
- Origin: United States
- Genres: Rock
- Years active: 1984–present
- Members: Mark Benson; Mac Ruffing; Chris Colon; Joseph Bologna
- Past members: Gary Grimes; Todd Rainey; Ricky Vacca; Graham Alexander; Tom Work; Robert Miller; Tom Teeley; John Auker; Greg George; Terry Manfredi; Jimmy Pou; Bobby Potter; Doug Couture
- Website: 1964thetribute.com

1964 The Tribute (originally called "1964 as The Beatles") is a US Beatles tribute band formed in 1984, exactly 20 years since the Beatles' first arrival in 1964 and the start of Beatlemania. The group focuses on early Beatles music from the 1964 "British invasion" era when the band first toured in the US.

== Updating the Beatles ==
1964 The Tribute strive for authenticity in their portrayal of the Beatles, but not everything they do is the same. Two areas that differ are sound quality and set length. Mark Benson, who portrays John Lennon in the band, says in the original Beatles live performances in the 1960s, the fans were lucky to hear the music. "You have to credit the Beatles with revolutionizing the sound-reinforcement industry," says Benson. "Back then, they had these little speakers that you couldn't hear anything out of. The way concerts were amplified had to be changed." Benson says fans who saw the original shows notice the difference. "People will come up to us and say, 'I saw the Beatles in '64, and the only difference is I can hear you,'" Benson says.

Another difference is the set length. The Beatles did two 30-minute sets in their early shows and never did encores, while 1964 the Tribute performs two 45-minute sets. "We tried the half-hour show initially, but it didn't go over well," says Benson.

== Members ==
The members of the group decided which member would portray which Beatle based on the instrument he played. "I was a guitarist, so the natural thing was the John or the George character," says Tom Work, who portrayed George Harrison until September 2022. "The way I got into it was, the fellow playing John Lennon [Benson] joined a band that was a local Beatles tribute act. This was around 1981. After about a year, he got his buddy [Grimes] to join and play Paul, and I was friends with him. About a year later, he got me to join and play George." Over the years, the lineup has included:

=== ‘John Lennon’ ===
- Mark Benson (1984–Present).

=== ‘Paul McCartney’ ===
- Gary Grimes (1984–2009). Died 2010.
- Todd Rainey (2009–2010). Also played with Shout, Beatlemania and The Moptops
- Ricky Vacca (2010–2011). Also played with Beatlemania Now.
- Graham Alexander (2011–2013). Also played with Rain and Let it be.
- Mac Ruffing (2013–present). Also played with Rain and BeatlemaniaLive!

=== ‘George Harrison’ ===
- Tom Work (1984–1986, 1989–1993, 2006–2022)
- Bob Miller (1986–1989). Also played with Beatlemania. Currently the conductor of the 1964 orchestra shows at Carnegie Hall.
- Tom Teeley (1993–1994). Also played with Beatlemania and Rain.
- Jimmy Pou (1994–2006). Also played with Beatlemania and Rain.
- John Auker (2022–2023). Also played with A Hard Days Night
- Doug Couture (2023–2026). Also played with the Fab Four and American English.
- Chris Colon (2023–present). Also played with Beatlemania Now, The British Invasion, The Fab Four and Strawberry Fields

=== ‘Ringo Starr’ ===
- Greg George (1984–1987, 1989–2006). Also played with Liverpool Legends and The Moptops.
- Terry Manfredi (1987–1989, 2006–2010). Also played with The Return during a brief hiatus in September 2009-January 2010
- Bobby Potter (2010–2023).
- Joe Bologna (2021–Present). Also played with the Fab Four and Rain.

The group plans to continue performing. Asked about their future, Tom Work, who portrayed George Harrison until September 2022, said, "The answer to that is the answer Gary gave his dad. His dad asked him, 'How long are you going to do this?' And Gary Grimes (who played Paul McCartney until retiring in 2009 due to brain cancer) said, 'Until they stop coming.' We are not anywhere close to the age the Beatles were. I'm sure many people will comment, 'They're starting to look a little old to be doing this,' but people are still coming. Just being a musician keeps you young at heart."

The current lineup is Mark Benson as Lennon, Mac Ruffing as McCartney, Chris Colon as Harrison and Joseph Bologna as Starr. However, Jimmy Pou (Harrison) and Bobby Potter (Starr) still occasionally fill in when Chris Colon (Harrison) and Joe Bologna (Starr) are on tour with the Fab Four or other groups.

Gary Grimes died after a long battle with brain cancer in December 2010 at the age 60. His death was hard on the members and their fans, especially Benson. A memorial service was broadcast online. Benson performed "In My Life" at the service. Ron McNeil, a friend of Grimes, and his band, the Fab Four, also did a tribute to Grimes.

== Mission ==
The band's mission is to accurately re-create the 1964 Beatles invasion of America. Members play a set of all early Beatles music, with some middle Beatles thrown in. Sometimes the group's costumes reflect the Beatles' early period, and sometimes members wear replicas of the Shea Stadium concert apparel from 1965. "The concept is performing a show that gives you an idea of what it was like to see the Beatles when they were touring," says Benson. "It's definitely a music gig, but there's an acting element to it," says Work. "None of us is really an actor per se. I probably come closest because I've done some plays, just in community theater. But there's some acting. You need to adopt the body language, the speaking voice. Those two things, I guess, for this kind of a role are two aspects that resemble acting. Everything else is more musicianship and vocal impersonation — singing, I mean." The group separates its life onstage from offstage. "We didn't want to be them, just wanted to portray them," says Work. "No one really considered wearing those boots around all the time or the tight pants or having hair that looked like that. We were musicians before, professional, full-time musicians. We didn't start doing Beatles until we were 30."

== Discography ==
=== PBS Soundtrack CD ===
1. I Saw Her Standing There
2. I Want to Hold Your Hand
3. From Me to You
4. Love Me Do
5. Please Please Me
6. Do You Want to Know a Secret?
7. All My Loving
8. This Boy
9. And I Love Her
10. Act Naturally
11. Eight Days a Week
12. A Hard Day's Night
13. I Should Have Known Better
14. If I Fell
15. Can't Buy Me Love
16. Nowhere Man
17. Twist and Shout
18. Roll Over Beethoven
19. "I Feel Fine"
20. Paperback Writer
21. In My Life
22. If I Needed Someone
23. We Can Work It Out
24. Yellow Submarine
25. Yesterday
26. Help!
27. Day Tripper
28. She Loves You

=== "All You Need Is Live!" ===
==== Disc 1 ====
1. I Saw Her Standing There
2. I Want To Hold Your Hand
3. Love Me Do
4. Please Please Me
5. Do You Want to Know a Secret?
6. All My Loving
7. This Boy
8. Till There Was You
9. Eight Days a Week
10. A Hard Day's Night
11. I Should Have Known Better
12. Nowhere Man
13. Can't Buy Me Love

==== Disc 2 ====
1. Twist and Shout
2. Roll Over Beethoven
3. I Feel Fine
4. Michelle
5. And Your Bird Can Sing
6. Taxman
7. I'm a Loser
8. I Don't Want to Spoil the Party
9. Yellow Submarine
10. Yesterday
11. Help!
12. Day Tripper
13. She Loves You
14. Dizzy Miss Lizzy
15. Long Tall Sally

=== Nine Hours in November ===
1. It Won't Be Long
2. There's a Place
3. I'll Follow the Sun
4. If I Fell
5. Boys
6. Slow Down
7. Kansas City
8. Bad Boy
9. Don't Bother Me
10. And I Love Her
11. Any Time at All
12. You Can't Do That
13. I'm Down
14. Rock and Roll Music

=== 30/50 Celebration ===
1. I Want To Hold Your Hand
2. I Saw Her Standing There
3. Love Me Do
4. Thank You Girl
5. Please Please Me
6. I'll Get You
7. I'm Happy Just To Dance With You
8. All My Loving
9. Boys
10. And I Love Her
11. A Hard Days Night
12. If I Fell
13. Money
14. She Loves You

=== Something Newer ===
1. And Your Bird Can Sing
2. Drive My Car
3. Ticket to Ride
4. You're Going to Lose That Girl
5. 12 String Medley (If I Needed Someone, What You're Doing, I Call Your Name, Eight Days a Week)
6. It's Only Love
7. Think For Yourself
8. Doctor Robert
9. We Can Work It Out
10. George and Ringo Duet (Honey Don't, Everybody's Trying to be my Baby)
11. Paperback Writer
12. Rain
13. In My Life
14. Day Tripper
15. Encore (Rock and Roll Music, Matchbox, Roll Over Beethoven, Long Tall Sally)

=== Starhand Visions ===
Original material by Gary Grimes. Other members are on the album throughout it.

1. They're Here...
2. The Arrival Theme
3. The Illusion
4. From the Light of Change
5. Hold On
6. Hold On to Love
7. Daydream Lover
8. Marla Star
9. Take Good Care of Her Heart
10. Would You Say No?
11. Tell Her I'm Home
12. You Are My Heart
13. Because of You
14. I Can't Live Without Your Love
15. Feel the Fire

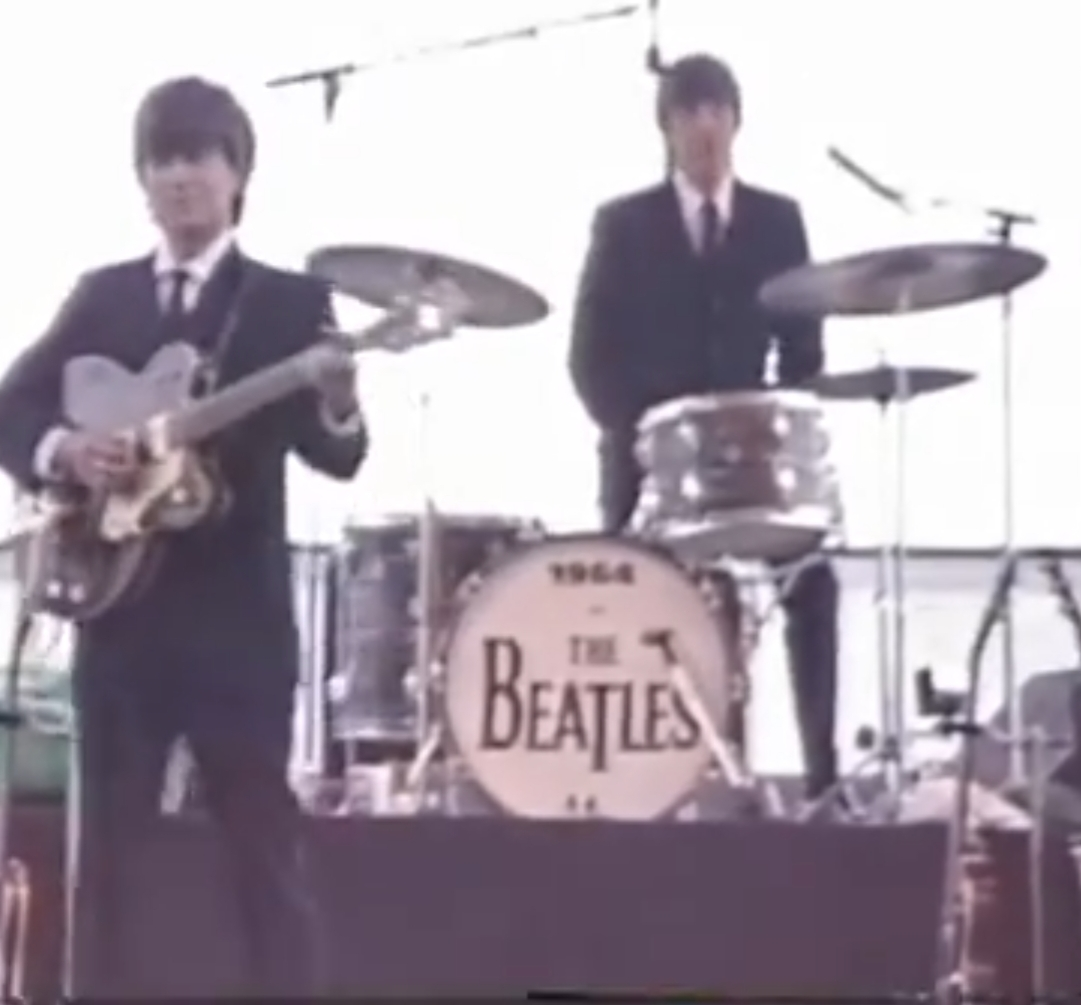
First logo of 1964 the Tribute. 1964 as The Beatles.
