= The Analogues =

Dutch tribute act to The Beatles

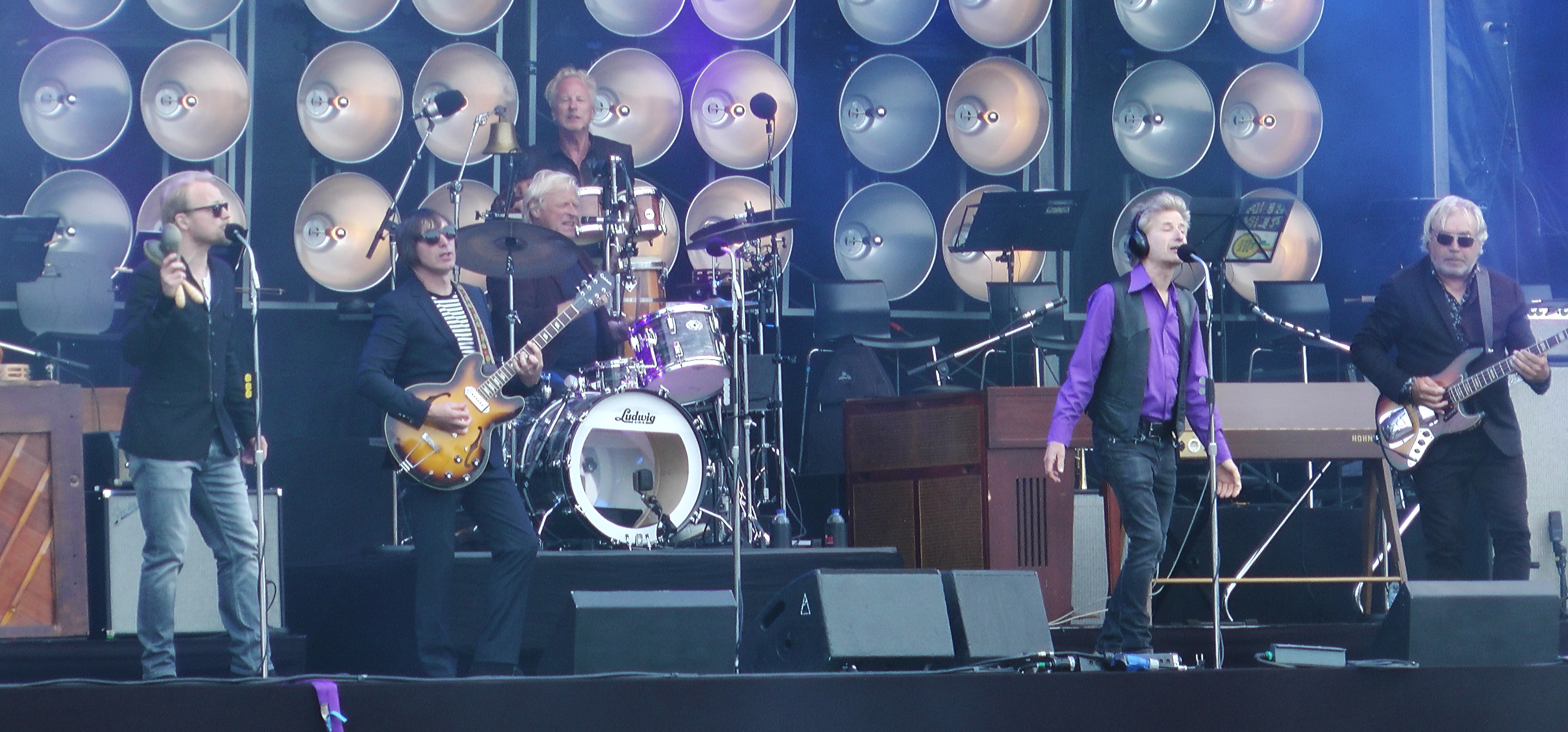
- The Analogues play Parkpop, 2018

Background information
- Origin: Netherlands
- Genres: Rock; pop; tribute
- Years active: 2014–2024
- Label: Decca Records
- Members: Jac Bico; Fred Gehring; Jan van der Meij; Diederik Nomden; Bart van Poppel; Felix Maginn
- Website: theanalogues.net

The Analogues were a Dutch tribute act dedicated to recreating the music of the Beatles. Founded in 2014, their goal was to perform the Beatles’ music from the band's later studio years live, using analogue and period-accurate instrumentation. The Beatles had never performed many of these songs or entire albums live. The Analogues gained recognition for their meticulous attention to detail and authenticity. While they did not attempt to resemble the Beatles visually, their performances were celebrated for accurately reproducing the Beatles' distinctive sound and musical complexity. The project ended with a final concert on 28 December 2024 at Ziggo Dome, Amsterdam.

== History ==
The band was the brainchild of Fred Gehring, the former top executive of the Tommy Hilfiger Corporation. He approached the bassist and producer Bart van Poppel, who, after a thorough analysis of the arrangements on the Beatles’ albums and consultation of "Beatles Gear", a detailed catalogue of all the instruments the Beatles used throughout their career, set out to find instruments faithful to the originals used by the group. This enabled them to source the necessary equipment, such as a Lowrey Heritage Deluxe organ from 1965 or one of only thirty known Mellotrons from a specific series which was used in the intro to "Strawberry Fields Forever".

Before an album could be performed, the band would write out the complex arrangements in full in sheet music. The perfection sought by the Analogues in presenting the Beatles’ sound as accurately as possible live was evident even in such details as the correct choice of bass guitar, the strings fitted to it, and conversion to the same pickups as those used by Paul McCartney.

We don’t try to look like them, so the sound is all that matters […] I see so many videos on YouTube where people are using the wrong bass or wrong strings. Information-wise, there’s a lot of rubbish on the internet. You have to listen carefully to figure out what instruments were used for what parts […].

— Bart van Poppel, Interview for the magazine Guitar World

Through their meticulous study of the Beatles’ songs, their instruments and sound collages, the Analogues were able to reproduce even extremely complex pieces such as "Being for the Benefit of Mr. Kite!", "Good Morning" (featuring self-produced animal sounds at the end) from the "Sgt. Pepper album" or "Revolution 9" from the "White Album" in their live performances. Revolution 9 presented Bart van Poppel with a particular challenge. As the band had made a point of not using samples, the original idea was to stand behind tape recorders in white lab coats, similar to the group Kraftwerk, which were to play their own sound collage. This idea was rejected and instead, the Dutch graphic designer Jaap Drupsteen was commissioned to produce a nine-minute film for "Revolution 9". Drupsteen based his work on the original White Album, and van Poppel subsequently created his own Sound collage to accompany it. When asked, “Didn’t it occur to you to leave out this unwieldy piece with its rather limited entertainment value altogether, so as not to take the momentum out of the show?” (Matthias Halbig), van Poppel replied:

No. We can’t do something like that. It’s part of the album – without ‘Number Nine’, the vision wouldn’t have been realised. We would have brought a curse upon ourselves.

— Bart van Poppel, Interview with Matthias Halbig for the Redaktionsnetzwerk Deutschland

The Dutch film director and producer Marcel de Vré accompanied The Analogues during preparations and subsequent live performances of "Sgt. Pepper's Lonely Hearts Club Band". He produced a detailed documentary film highlighting the meticulous attention to detail that went into this album, particularly by Bart van Poppel and Diederik Nomden.

In 2017, The Analogues signed a contract with Universal Music Group for five live recordings of Beatles albums and an album of their own songs inspired by the Beatles. The six albums were released on the Decca Records label, which had refused to sign a contract with the Beatles in 1962.

== Touring ==
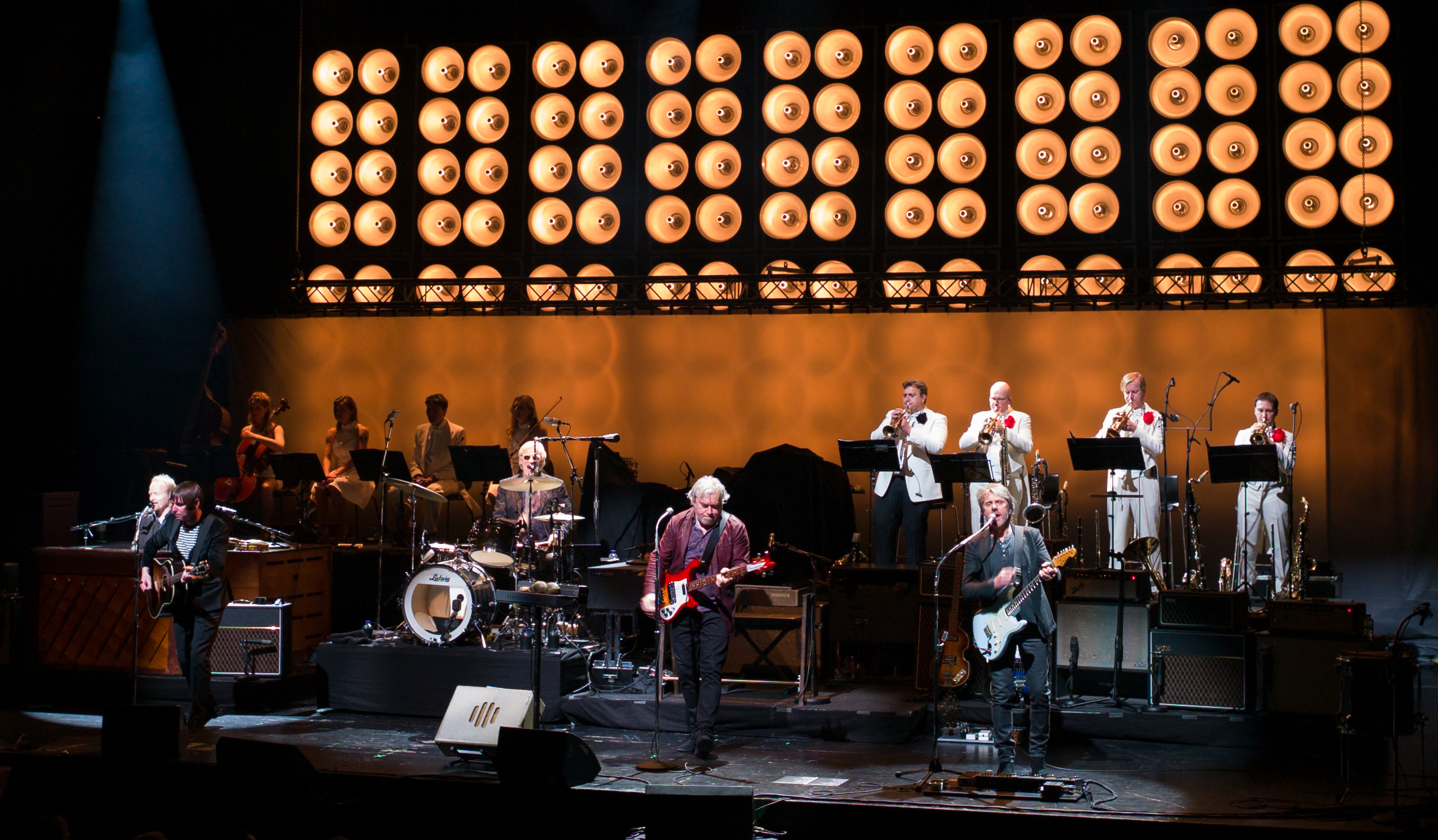
The Analogues – Concert as part of their ‘Magical Mystery Tour’ tour, 2018

The Analogues went on their first tour in the Netherlands and abroad in 2015–2016, performing the "Magical Mystery Tour" album.

In 2017, the band toured a complete performance of "Sgt. Pepper's Lonely Hearts Club Band", which included a performance at the 17,000-capacity Ziggo Dome in Amsterdam on 1 June 2017 to celebrate the album's 50-year anniversary. In June 2017, Dutch public-service broadcaster NTR aired a one-hour documentary on the band's painstaking process of analysing the Beatles' music and their experimental use of studio equipment, as well as their acquisition of the correct analogue instruments, in preparation for performing the "Sgt. Pepper's" album live. Before an album was performed, complete multi-layered arrangements were written out by the band.

In November 2017, the band suffered a setback when founding member Jan van der Meij (ex-Vitesse, Powerplay) had to inform his bandmates that, owing to increasingly severe hearing problems (Tinnitus) he would not be able to take part in the tour for the 1968 album "The Beatles", also known as "The White Album". Rehearsals and recordings for this album were already three-quarters complete, and The Analogues were now faced with a major problem, as van der Meij usually handled Paul McCartney’s high vocal ranges. Finding a suitable replacement proved difficult. Bart van Poppel initially asked guitarist Felix Maginn (Moke, Supersub) to step in for both the remaining recordings and the tour. Although Maginn had a lower-pitched voice he took over some of van der Meij’s parts, but was unable to sing all of McCartney’s parts, particularly the very high ones (e.g. "Birthday", "Helter Skelter"). This necessitated reorganisation of the song distribution within the band and the recruitment of additional "stand-in singers". The group held a specially arranged audition for this purpose, following which in addition to Maginn three further "McCartney singers" were hired, as no single musician could be booked for the tour because of other commitments.

To mark the 2018 "Beatleweek", which took place regularly in Liverpool, and the 50th anniversary of the release of the "White Album", The Analogues performed at the Liverpool Philharmonic on 24 August of that year. For this special event, Bart van Poppel insisted that van der Meij should be on stage, where he sang, among other things, "Helter Skelter". To protect his hearing on stage he wore noise-cancelling headphones (see photo in the infobox). After a lengthy break from performing and an improvement in his hearing, van der Meij subsequently appeared again as a guest vocalist at The Analogues’ shows.

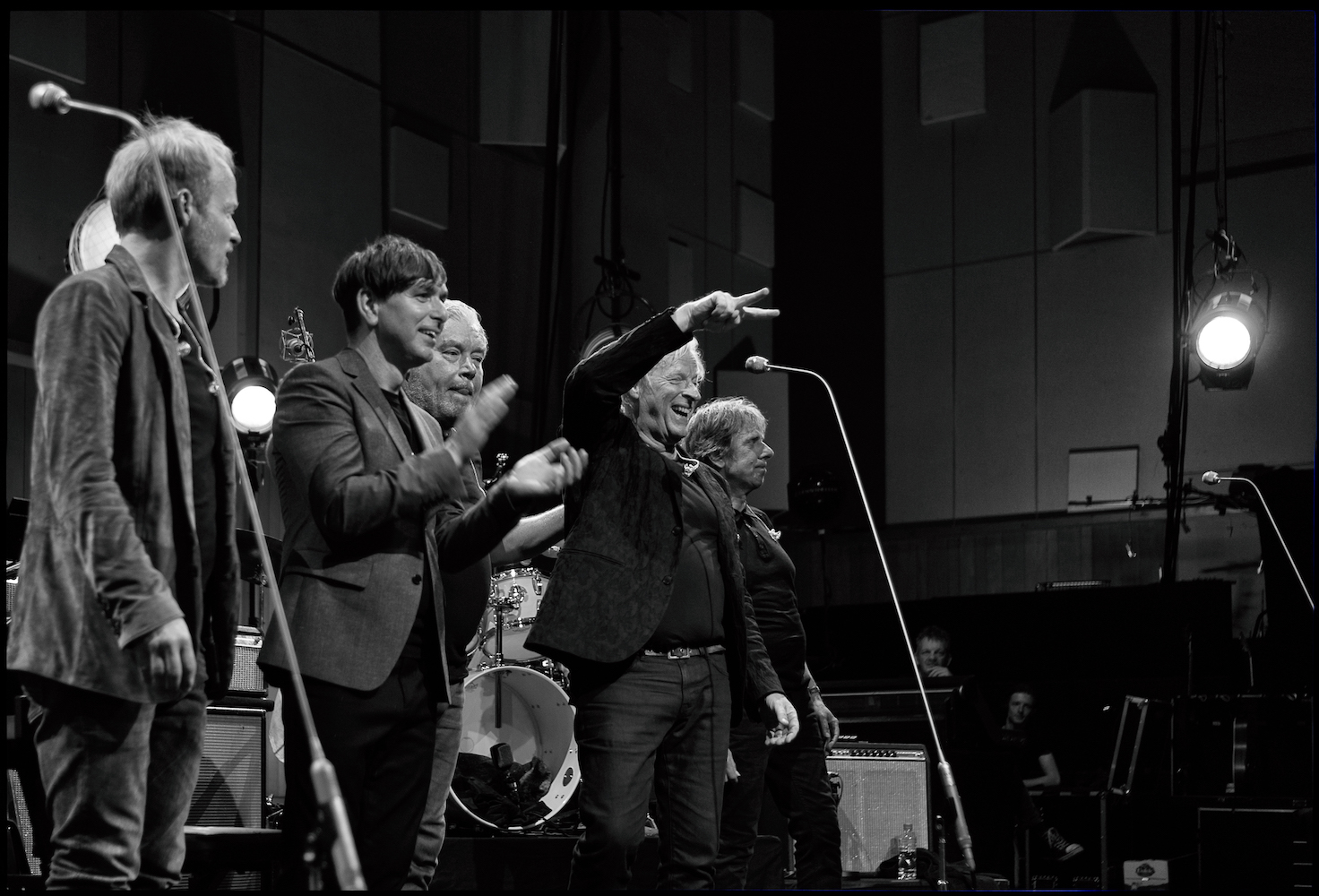
Concert by The Analogues at Abbey Road Studios, 2019

From 2018 to 2019 the Analogues toured the Netherlands, Belgium, Germany and the UK playing "The Beatles" album, also known as "The White Album". On 30 June 2019 the band recorded two live shows at Abbey Road Studios in London, where the Beatles had recorded.

The 2020/2021 tour, which was severely disrupted by the health crisis caused by COVID-19, was based on the re-recording of the albums "Abbey Road" and "Revolver". When the shows were interrupted by the coronavirus pandemic, the band wrote their own songs and released an album, "Introducing The Analogues Sideshow", in 2022.

In 2024, the band presented their final live show, "Sgt. Pepper and Revolver from start to finish and much more", in Berlin, Düsseldorf and Frankfurt.

== War Child charity tour ==
In April 2025, preparations began for a special charity tour, ‘The Analogues Light: Ticket to Ride,’ which the band planned to complete by bicycle, travelling from the Netherlands to Ukraine. To mark the 30th anniversary of the children's aid organisation War Child, the band was supporting this campaign to raise awareness of the situation of children in war zones and collect donations for this cause. The proceeds from small, selected concerts along the route from Amsterdam to Lviv went to War Child.

To keep logistics for the tour to a minimum, The Analogues travelled with a small line-up: Felix Maginn (vocals, guitar), Diederik Nomden (vocals, keyboard), Jac Bico (vocals, guitar), Bart van Poppel (bass) and Kees Schaper (drums), Schaper replaced Fred Gehring, who was unable to perform because of injury. The set consisted of selected Beatles compositions, without orchestra. The charity tour started on 16 June 2025 in Amsterdam. Due to heavy bombardment by the Russian army, The Analogues decided not to cross the Polish-Ukrainian border on 12 July 2025 and cancelled their final concert in Lviv.

== Recordings ==
In 2017, The Analogues signed a contract with Universal Music Group for five live recordings of Beatles albums and an album of their own songs inspired by the Beatles. The six albums were released on the Decca Records label, which had refused to sign a contract with the Beatles in 1962.

== Instruments ==
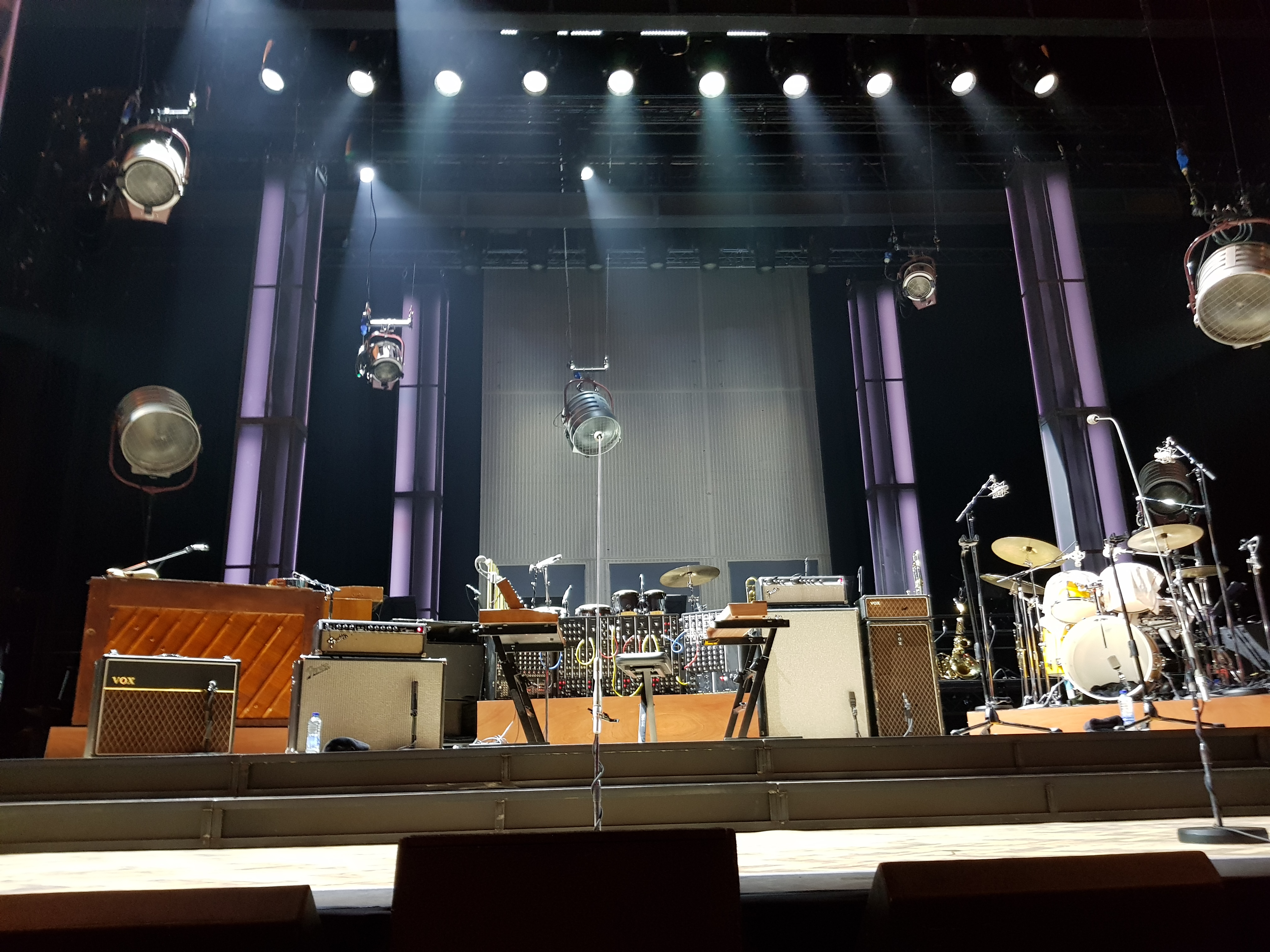
Instruments used during the 2019 Abbey Road tour, Lotto Arena, Antwerp

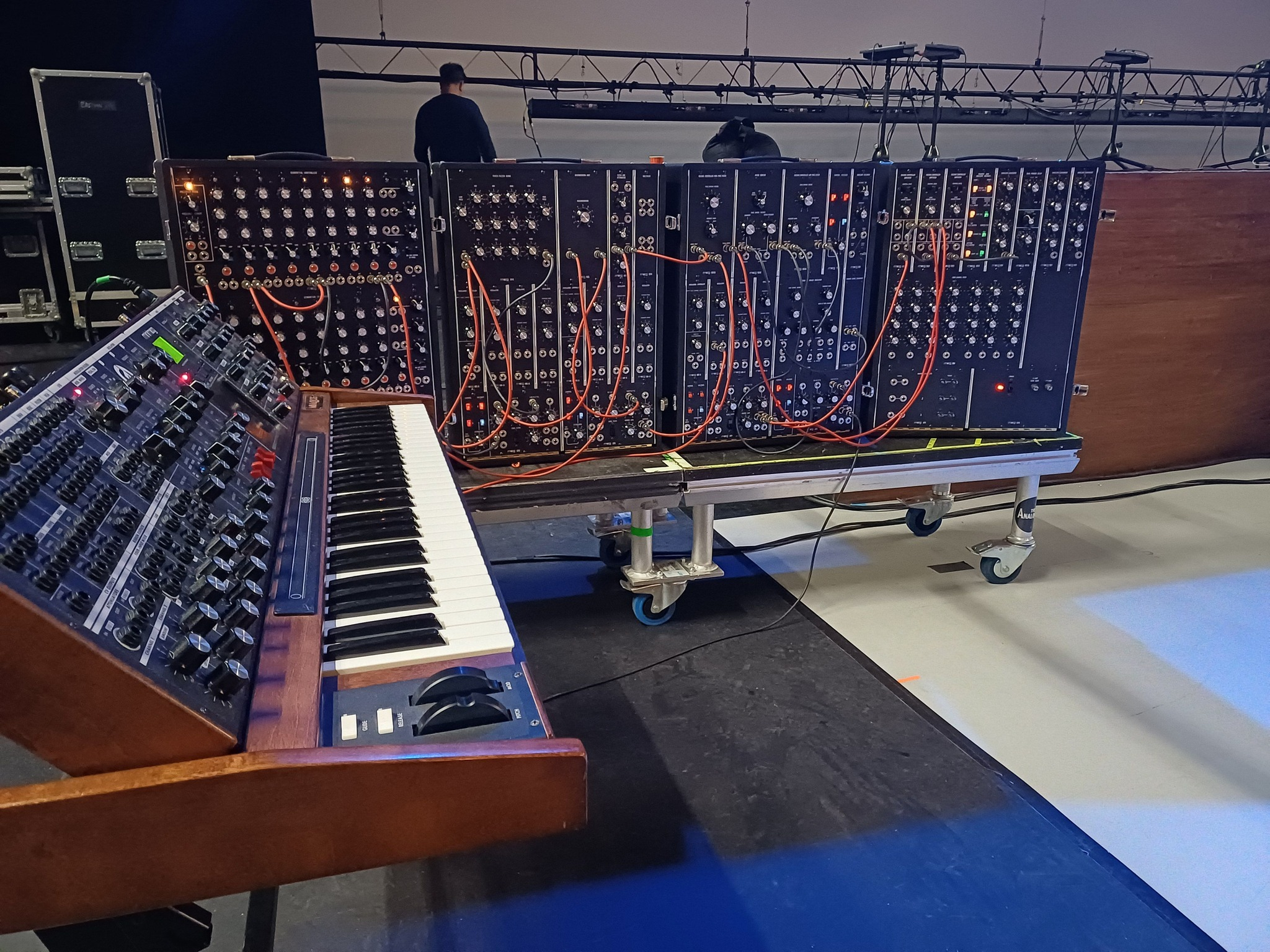
Original Moog synthesizer for the live performance of The White Album by The Analogues, November 2024

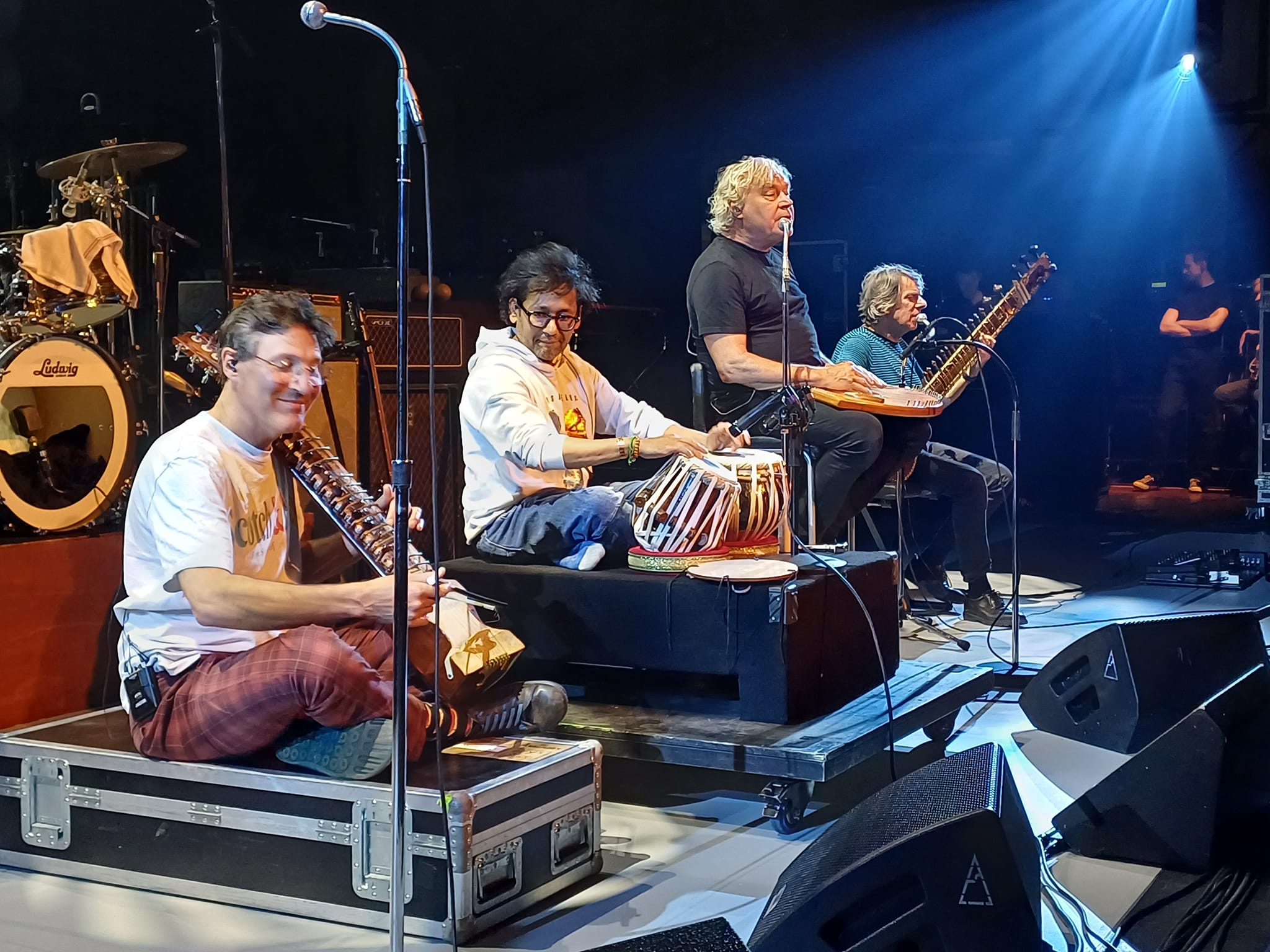
Rehearsal of Within You Without You, May 2024

The Analogues amassed a vast collection of musical instruments in order to replicate the Beatles' original recordings as closely as possible. Their inventory included pieces like a black-and-white Rickenbacker guitar resembling John Lennon's, a light blue Fender Stratocaster similar to George Harrison's, and a Höfner 500/1 bass. They also incorporated Indian instruments into their performances, such as a dilruba, a swarmandal, a tanpura, a tabla, and a sitar. Notable speciality instruments included a one-metre-long harmonica for “The Fool on the Hill” and a clavioline for "Baby, You're a Rich Man".

The band’s principal analyst was bass guitarist and producer Bart van Poppel. After meticulously analyzing an album’s arrangements and consulting Beatles Gear, the band sought out the exact equipment needed, such as a 1965 Lowrey Heritage Deluxe organ, or one of only thirty known existing mellotrons from a specific series, famously used in the intro of “Strawberry Fields Forever.”

== Reviews ==
In 2014, Het Parool reviewed the premiere of the Magical Mystery Tour and described the Analogues' sound as "eerily close" to the Beatles. In 2015, De Volkskrant wrote that the band brought the Beatles' sound back to life "frighteningly well." In 2016, the Eastern Daily Press reviewed a Norwich performance as a "musical wonder" providing a "truly magical experience".

== Personnel ==
Former members

- Jac Bico – guitar, vocals
- Fred Gehring – drums, vocals
- Felix Maginn – guitars, vocals
- Diederik Nomden – keys, guitar, vocals
- Bart van Poppel – bass, keys, vocals and producer
- Jan van der Meij – guitar, vocals

== Other sources ==
Website: The Analogues
