= Graham Alexander (musician) =

American singer-songwriter (born 1989)

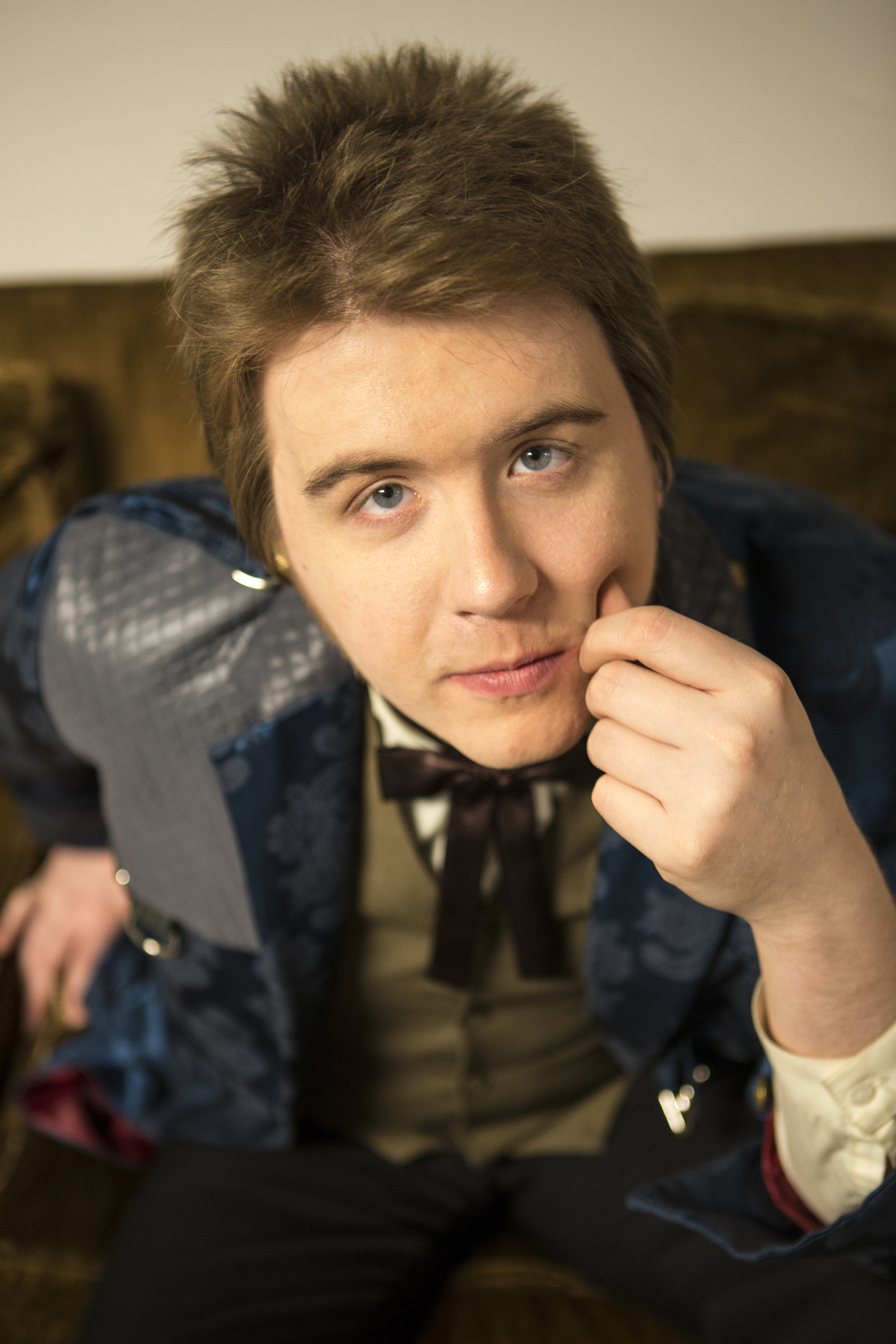
- Alexander in 2013.

Background information
- Born: May 2, 1989 (age 37); Camden, New Jersey
- Genre: Rock
- Occupations: Singer-songwriter, entertainer, entrepreneur
- Website: www.graham-alexander.net

Graham Alexander (born May 2, 1989 in Camden, New Jersey) is an American singer-songwriter, entertainer, and entrepreneur known best for his solo music career and for his roles in the Broadway shows Rain: A Tribute to the Beatles and Let It Be and as the entrepreneur who founded a new incarnation of the Victor Talking Machine Co. in Camden, N.J.

== Early life and career ==
Graham Alexander became interested in music when he and a friend picked a music documentary VHS out of the trash. In middle school, he founded his first band, The Roadrunners, which developed a following in the New York City and Philadelphia areas. Alexander wrote award-winning songs for the band's albums Breakaway (2006) and The Roadrunners: Cellar Sessions (2003) under an independent label deal. The band later split and Graham moved onto writing for solo projects as well as for soundtrack material. He was also the lead character actor for The Beatles: Rock Band.

== Music career ==
Graham began writing and recording his first full-length studio album in 2009. His debut album was released December 6, 2011 and, weeks after, his song "Biggest Fan" was featured on Spotify's "Top Tracks of 2011 – Picked by Users" playlist. In 2012, he set out on a tour with his band and played events such as the Non-COMMvention in Philadelphia and LarkFEST in Albany, NY. Shortly after, he began work on his follow up-album, spending time writing and working in the studio.

In Spring 2013, Graham and his band embarked on a tour including stops at the Abbey Road on the River Festival, the Black Potato Music Festival, Quick Chek Festival of Ballooning, and Musikfest.

Graham released his second album, Repeat Deceiver, through the revived Victor Talking Machine Co. label in 2014. Its first single of the same name hit national airwaves in February 2015 prompting a small radio tour with stops including Albany, N.Y. and Ocean City, Md.

On March 27, 2016 Graham's song "I'm A Man" made its television debut on Marvel's Guardians of the Galaxy on Disney XD. It was featured in "We Are the World Tree" Season 1, Episode 16 and "Fox on the Run" Season 1, Episode 20.

== Entrepreneurial endeavors ==
A resident of Camden, New Jersey, Alexander first became interested in Camden's RCA Victor complex when passing the facility on the train as a child.

In 2008, Graham began his own company which consisted of his studio, production, rehearsal and office facilities in Camden County, New Jersey. The company, LAIR Media (Licensed American Independent Recording) was the controlling entity of the recording and production of Graham's debut release in 2011 and outside projects. In 2011, LAIR Media moved its expanding production facilities to a 13,000-square-foot (1,200 m^{2}) factory in Pennsauken Township, New Jersey where the company continued to grow and expand into video production, product development, and an independent record label. After purchasing several brands and assets from the GE-cast-off Radio Corporation of America portfolio at auction, LAIR Media merged its assets with the new acquisitions, adopted the newly acquired Radio Corporation of America corporate identity, established the Victor Talking Machine Co. record label, and Camden, Victrola, His Master's Voice, and Little Nipper imprints.

In 2015, Graham opened additional offices for Victor Talking Machine Co. in a former bank building in Berlin, N.J. "The Vault at Victor Records" houses the master recordings, marketing materials, and documents of Victor. It also serves as a performing arts venue with music acts weekly.

== Discography ==
- Graham Alexander, Vol. 1 (EP), July 2011
- Graham Alexander, December 2011
- Graham Alexander – Japan Release, September 2013
- "Long Way Home" (single) – December 2013
- Repeat Deceiver, December 2014

== Broadway work ==
In 2010, he was part of the Broadway cast of the jukebox musical RAIN, which premiered at the Neil Simon Theater and later moved to the Brooks Atkinson Theatre in New York City. The production won a Drama Desk Award for Outstanding Revue in 2011. Years later, he was cast in the same role in a similar jukebox musical, LET IT BE, at the St. James Theatre in New York City and praised for his work in the role.
