= The Fab Four (tribute) =

California-based Beatles tribute band

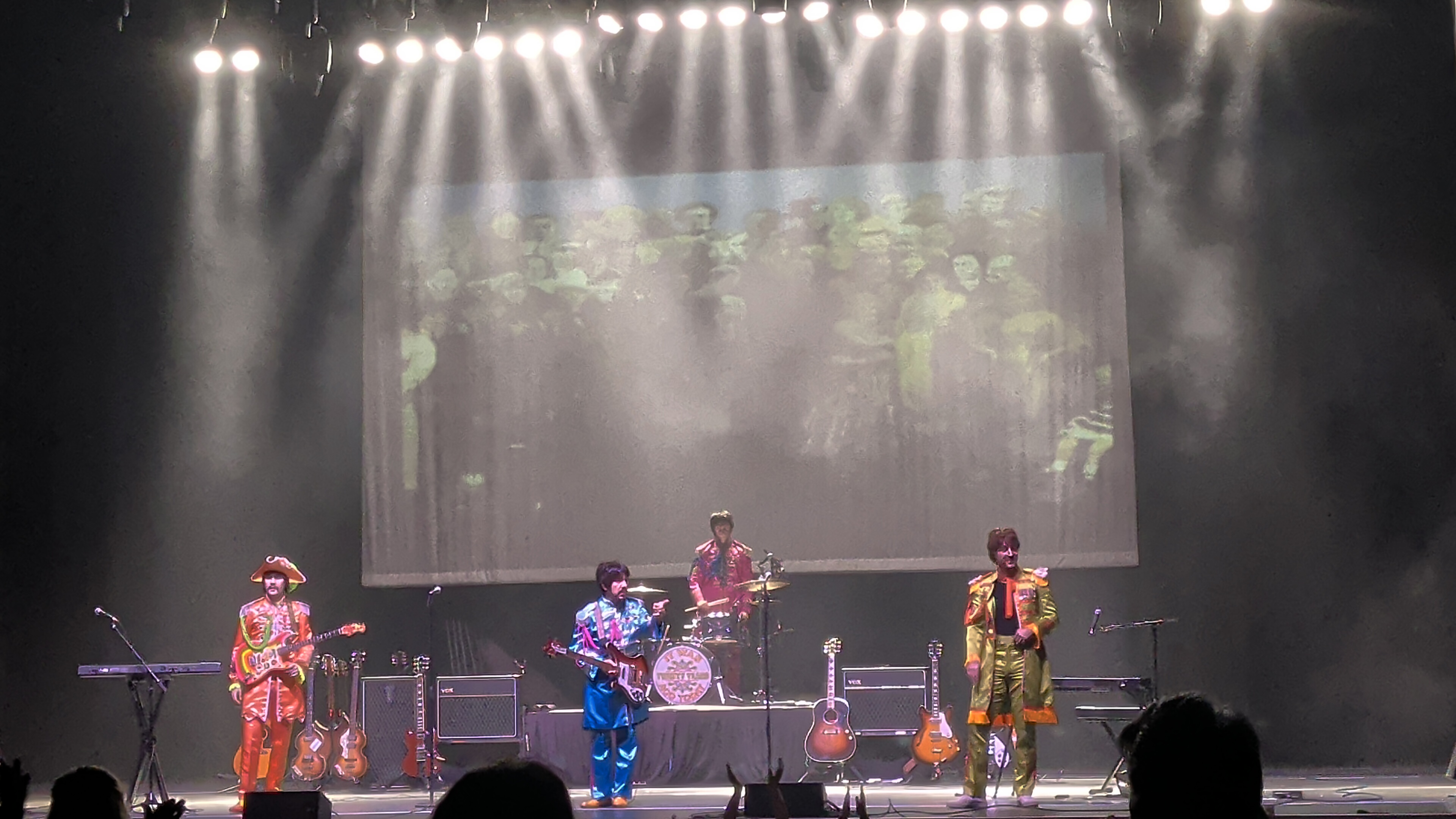
- The Fab Four performing in Anaheim, California in November 2025; From left to right: Robert Berg (George), Ardavan Sarraf (Paul), Erik Fidel (Ringo), and Adam Hastings (John)

Background information
- Also known as: The Ultimate Tribute
- Origin: Orange County, California
- Genres: Rock and roll; rock; pop; Beatlesque
- Years active: 1997–present
- Labels: Delta Ent. (Laserlight), New World Digital
- Award: Emmy Awards
- Members: Ardavan Sarraf; Neil Candelora; Ron McNeil; Adam Hastings; Gilbert Bonilla; Miles Frizzell; Paul Curatolo; Gavin Pring; Alexis Angel; Jonathan Fickes; Robbie Berg; Doug Couture; Chris Colon; Erik Fidel; Joseph Bologna; Jon McCracken; Neil Candelora
- Past members: David Brighton; Tyson Kelly; Richard Lewis; Rolo Sandoval; Joshua Jones; Brendan Peleo Lazar; Michael Amador; Luis Renteria; Frankee Mendonça; Frank Canino; Jim Owen; Joe Gallo; Steve Landes; John Auker; Steve Craig; Tony Felicetta; Brad Brunsdon; Jimmy Pou; Jeremy O’Dell; Mac Ruffing; Danny Leavitt; Robert Bielma; Tom Gable
- Website: www.TheFabFour.com

The Fab Four (officially The Fab Four: The Ultimate Tribute) is a California tribute band, later starring in a theatrical production, paying homage to the Beatles. They are based in Orange County, California. Founded in November 1997 by Westminster-born John Lennon impersonator Ron McNeil, Los Angeles-born Paul McCartney impersonator Ardavan Sarraf, Gardena-born George Harrison impersonator Michael Amador and Los Angeles-born Ringo Starr impersonator Rolo Sandoval, the group began performing Beatles music throughout Southern California and later the U.S. West Coast starting in 1998. They have performed worldwide in Canada, Japan, Malaysia, France, Spain, China, Hong Kong, the United Kingdom, Germany, Australia, Mexico, South Korea, the United Arab Emirates, Macau, Argentina, and Brazil, covering nearly the entire Beatles discography and material from some of the Beatles' members' solo projects.

The show is a faithfully detailed chronological history of the Beatles from their first appearance on The Ed Sullivan Show in 1964 to their breakup in 1970. The show has brief on-stage banter and interactions with the audience directly, but otherwise very little dialogue, mainly reenacting songs that the Beatles performed live along with songs from the members' solo works after the breakup. The band never uses pre-recorded tracks or a backstage fifth member (only in special performances), instead relying on the members to use keyboards to produce background instruments in songs like "Strawberry Fields Forever".

Since then, the Fab Four have performed in multiple residencies in Disneyland and Las Vegas, performing at various Beatles-themed and musical festivals, performing for numerous celebrities including those who are in the Beatles' inner circle, and performing in an Emmy award winning production of their 2012 PBS TV special. The band has since toured across the U.S. and Canada, and on occasion internationality.

According to McNeil, he mentioned that "It's no big secret that our rivals are a group called Rain", being the band's main competitor Rain: A Tribute to The Beatles. According to the Los Angeles Times, the band was nicknamed "The Best Beatles Show in The World." According to Sarraf, Paul McCartney's touring band has copies of the Fab Four's CDs on their tour bus.

== History ==
=== 1997-2005: Formation and early touring years ===
In the late 1980s to early 1990s, Ron McNeil and his friend alongside business partner Rolo Sandoval came up with the idea of the Fab Four after noticing Ardavan Sarraf and his band Glass Onion performing "Coming Up" impersonating as Paul McCartney during a sound-alike competition called "The Battle of the Beatles Bands" at The Fest for Beatles Fans (formerly Beatlesfest) in Los Angeles. “He sounded so much like Paul my hair stood up on the back of my neck,” McNeil said. “I couldn’t believe it.” Sarraf, a natural right-hander, taught himself to play the bass guitar left-handed to emulate McCartney, though he was playing right handed and not impersonating as McCartney at the time McNeil and Sandoval first met him.

Both McNeil and Sandoval went up to Sarraf after the performance and told Sarraf about their plan to create a top-tier Beatles tribute and asked Sarraf if he was interested in a full-time gig. McNeil said when he asked Sarraf about joining his band, at first he declined. However, after many phone calls conversations, he eventually agreed. According to McNeil in an email interview, the original members of the band (including McNeil, Sarraf, and Sandoval) were in separate bands before forming the Fab Four. McNeil was originally in a band called Imagine: A Tribute to The Beatles in 1992, Sarraf was a part of a cover group he and his high school friends formed called Glass Onion, and Sandoval was a part of a band called Revolver.

McNeil, Sandoval, and Sarraf then recruited musician David Brighton to portray George Harrison and formed the Fab Four, which McNeil nicknamed "The Ultimate Beatles Tribute Band." The band's beginnings included Tuesday night performances at a small 50s-60s venue called Music City in Fountain Valley, a weekend residency at Disneyland's Tomorrowland Terrace in Anaheim from 1998 to 2005, The Hop in Puente Hills, and Scruffy O’Sheas in Marina del Rey, the latter they performed with many celebrities, including Micky Dolenz of the Monkees.

In 1998, Brighton left the band to become a David Bowie impersonator. Michael Amador took his place after sending a video demo of his work for the band.

=== 2005-2008: Las Vegas residency and rotating cast ===
The Fab Four signed a contract with various resorts and casinos in Las Vegas, Nevada for four years. The band brought in a second cast of musicians to help perform a full stage residency six nights a week in the city strip, with various members alternating between the casts. Performing as Fab Four Mania, the Las Vegas cast performed regularly at locations such as the Las Vegas Hilton, the Aladdin, the Sahara and the Riviera. Notable members of the cast included Detroit-born Joseph Bologna, who formerly performed with Rain: A Tribute to the Beatles on Broadway and 1964 the Tribute, as Starr; Pittsburgh-born Steve Landes, formerly a cast member of Beatlemania, as Lennon; and Westminster-born Frankee Mendonça, McNeil's younger brother, as McCartney. Shortly after 2008, the original cast (McNeil, Sarraf, Amador, and Sandoval) began touring nationwide and on occasion internationally. Amador left the band in 2008 to work backstage as technical director in 2008, leaving Liverpool-born Gavin Pring to take his place. The Fab Four then sued David Saxe Productions and others in a trademark complaint about their Beatles tribute show in Las Vegas called "Fab Four Live" in accusations of using similar names and performing in the same resorts and casinos as the Fab Four.

=== 2008-2020: PBS special and later touring years ===
In 2010, The Fab Four filed a lawsuit against Colorado based tribute band The Fab 4 in accusations of copying the name as well as the look and performance. As a result, the Fab Four filed the trademarks and use for the name in 2011. That same year, Sandoval retired from the band, but still works backstage as a sound engineer and tour manager and sometimes fills in as Starr; he was replaced by Sacramento-born Erik Fidel. Fidel does not have Starr's nose shape but it takes 90 minutes to put on a prosthetic. On July 12, 2013, the PBS special The Fab Four: The Ultimate Tribute (starring McNeil, Sarraf, Pring, and Fidel), filmed at Pechanga Resort Casino on January 6, 2012, received an regional Emmy Award for special events coverage. Travis Fox, founder of the special's producer, MindFox Productions, received the Emmy on behalf of the production.

In 2018, McNeil announced his semi retirement from the Fab Four. He said, "After 25 years, I want to be home a little more. But I'm still president of the company, and everybody who started this with me are still my business partners, even though only Ardy's still on stage. So it'll be carrying on, which is great." He endorsed Newcastle-born Adam Hastings (originally from the Bootleg Beatles) as his replacement on November 23rd at the City National Grove of Anaheim, though McNeil comes back to perform whenever Hastings is unavailable. Amador also became the band's manager in July. From November 2018 to March 2020, the regular lineup consisted of Sarraf (McCartney), Hastings (Lennon), Pring (Harrison), and Bologna (Starr).

=== 2020-present: Pandemic and recent years ===
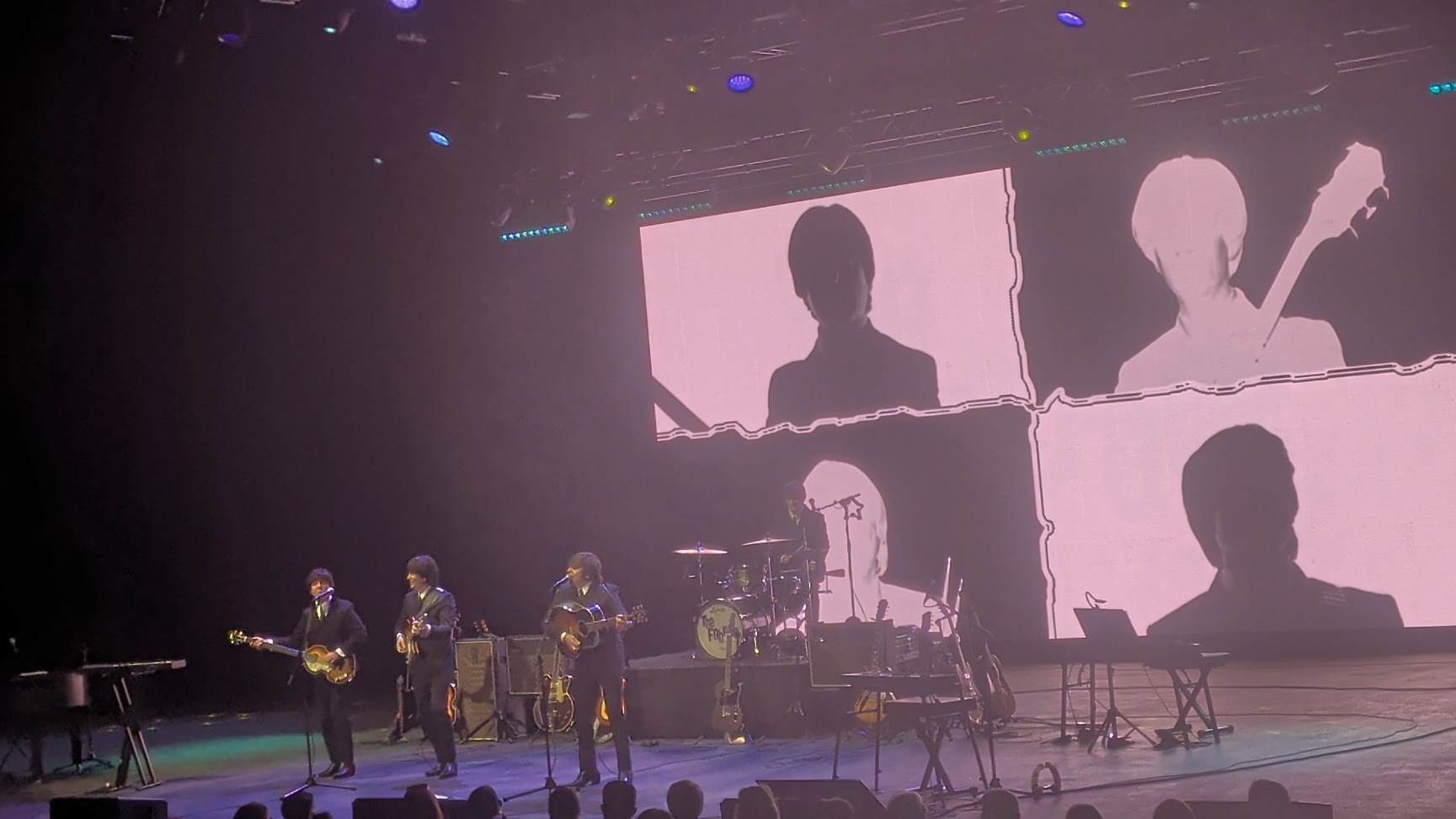
The Fab Four performing at the Pacific Amphitheatre at the Orange County Fair, Costa Mesa California, August 2026

From 2020 to 2022, due to the COVID-19 pandemic, the Fab Four live-streamed numerous concerts at their headquarters in Upland, with McNeil, Sandoval, and Fidel returning to perform. From late 2020–2022, the lineup consisted of McNeil (Lennon), Sarraf (McCartney), Pring (Harrison), and Sandoval (Starr).

Starting in late 2020, as the lockdown was slowing down, the band started to tour nationwide and occasionally performed out of country, with most of the members rotating and performing whether the core actor is out sick or is on vacation starting in 2021. As of 2026, the regular lineup consisted of McNeil (Lennon), Sarraf (McCartney), Pring (Harrison), and Fidel (Starr).

== Lineup ==
=== Original members ===
From 1998 to 2010, the Fab Four originally had four members all from Southern California. They were:

==== "John Lennon" ====
- Ron McNeil, co-founder of the band. From Westminster, California. Formerly a part of Wingsband and founded the Monkee Men.

==== "Paul McCartney" ====
- Ardy Sarraf, co-founder of the band. From Los Angeles, California. Also founded Wingsband and Paul On The Run. Formerly a part of Hard Day's Night band.

==== "George Harrison" ====
- Michael Amador, founding member of the band. From Gardena, California. Formerly a part of Wingsband.

==== "Ringo Starr" ====
- Rolo Sandoval, co-founder of the band. From Los Angeles. Also a part of Paul On The Run. Formerly a part of Wingsband and Hard Day's Night band. He still fills in as Ringo once a year.

=== Current members ===
Since 2010, the Fab Four has had a rotating cast. The current members in the Fab Four's regular rotation are:

==== "John Lennon" ====
- Ron McNeil, co-founder of the band. From Westminster, California.
- Adam Hastings, joined 2018. From Newcastle, England. Previously a part of the Bootleg Beatles.
- Jon Fickes, joined 2019. From Moses Lake, Washington. Also a part of the Monkee Men.
- Gilbert Bonilla, joined 2006. Founder of Hard Day's Night band. Formerly a part of Wingsband.

==== "Paul McCartney" ====
- Ardy Sarraf, co-founder of the band. From Los Angeles, California.
- Miles Frizzell, joined 2022. From Nashville, Tennessee. Great nephew of Lefty and David Frizzell and related to Augustine Frizzell. Previously a part of 1964 the Tribute. Currently a part of the Bootleg Beatles.
- Paul Curatolo, joined 2026. From Reno, Nevada. Son of Joey Curatolo. Currently a part of Rain: A Tribute to the Beatles.
- Neil Candelora, joined 2011. From Orlando, Florida. Also a part of Studio Two and the music director of Liverpool Legends.

==== "George Harrison" ====
- Gavin Pring, joined 2004. From Liverpool, England. Also founded George Harry's Son. Also a part of Paul On The Run and Hard Day's Night band.
- Robbie Berg (Note: Berg also occasionally performs as Lennon, McCartney, or Starr.), joined 2017. From Spokane, Washington. Also a part of Liverpool Legends, Beatles vs. Stones, The Monkee Men, and Hard Day's Night band.
- Doug Couture, joined 2011. From Houston, Texas. Also a part of the Monkee Men and 1964 the Tribute. Previously a part of American English.
- Chris Colon, joined 2022. From Asbury Park, New Jersey. Also a part of Beatlemania Now, 1964 the Tribute and Strawberry Fields.
- Alexis Angel, joined 2026. From Los Angeles, California. Also a part of Paul On The Run.

==== "Ringo Starr" ====
- Erik Fidel, joined 2010. From Sacramento, California.
- Joe Bologna joined 2005. From Detroit, Michigan. Previously a part of Rain: A Tribute to the Beatles and currently a part of 1964 the Tribute and Liverpool Legends.
- Jon McCracken, joined 2018. From Los Angeles, California.

==== "Ed Sullivan" ====
- George Trullinger, joined 2011. From Miami, Florida.
- Jeff DeHart, joined 2015. From New Jersey.

=== Former members ===
==== "John Lennon" ====
- Tyson Kelly (2011-2026). From Thousand Oaks, California. Son of Tom Kelly. Also played with the Bootleg Beatles and Britain's Finest.
- Frank Canino (2009–2010). Also played with American English.
- Joe Gallo, also played with Imagine.
- Steve Landes (2005–2008, 2019, 2022). From Pittsburgh, Pennsylvania. Currently a member of Rain: A Tribute to the Beatles.
- Steve Craig (2005–2008). Was a member of Fab Four Mania in Las Vegas.

==== "Paul McCartney" ====
- Frankee Mendonça (2005–2014, 2022). From Westminster, California. Brother of Ron McNeil. Also a part of the Monkee Men. Previously a part of Hard Day's Night band, Britain's Finest, British Mania, and Yesterday.
- Joshua Jones (2019–2025). From Seattle, Washington. Also a part of the Monkee Men, Studio Two, Britain's Finest, and Hard Day's Night band. Occasionally performs as Starr.
- Mac Ruffing (1998). currently a member of 1964 the Tribute. Previously a part of Rain, Beatlemania Now, and Imagine.

==== "George Harrison" ====
- Michael Amador (1998–2010). From Gardena, California. Currently works as the band's technical director and manager.
- David Brighton (1997–1998). Currently a David Bowie impersonator.
- Jim Owen (1998). Also played with Classical Mystery Tour.
- John Auker (2024). Currently a member of Hard Day's Night.
- Danny Leavitt (2010). Also played with American English.
- Robert Bielma (2011, 2023–2025). Founder of Britain's Finest.
- Jimmy Pou (1998). Founder of Four Lads from Liverpool. Also a part of Hard Day's Night Band. Previously a part of 1964 the Tribute , Rain, and British Mania.

==== "Ringo Starr" ====
- Rolo Sandoval, co-founder of the band (1997-2010, 2020-2022). From Los Angeles, California. Also a part of Paul On The Run. Formerly a part of Wingsband, Hard Day's Night band, Classical Mystery Tour, and British Mania. He still fills in as Ringo once a year.
- Brendan Peleo-Lazar (2015–2016). Currently works as one of the band's sound engineers and drummer of Britain's Finest.
- Jeremy O’Dell (2014–2015). Also played with Because.
- Luis Renteria (2005–2019). Currently works as one of the band's sound engineers. Also a part of Britain's Finest.
- Brad Brunsdon (2017). Currently a member of UK Beatlemania.
- Tony Felicetta (2005–2008). Was a member of Fab Four Mania.
- Tom Gable (2012). Previously a part of American English.
- Richard Lewis (2022–2025). From Las Vegas, Nevada. Currently a member and the drummer of Liverpool Legends.

==== "Ed Sullivan" ====
- Jerry Hoban, (2000–2015), died May 2015. From Las Vegas, Nevada.
- Fred Whitfield (2016–2024).

George Trullinger and Jeff DeHart portray Ed Sullivan as the MC of Fab Four shows, in reference to the Beatles on The Ed Sullivan Show. The first actor to portray Sullivan was Jerry Hoban, who was known for playing an Ed Sullivan impersonator in the 1994 film Pulp Fiction. Hoban died in May 2015. The Fab Four dedicated the song "In My Life" to him from 2015 until 2022. In September 2023, the Fab Four's first manager, Mike Dixon passed. "In My Life" was dedicated to him and Beatles manager Brian Epstein in subsequent concerts during the group's 2023 Rubber Soul tour.

== Side projects ==
=== The Fab Four: The Ultimate Tribute ===
The Fab Four: The Ultimate Tribute is a PBS musical TV special that was aired on various PBS stations nationwide on June 3, 2012, that lasted an hour and one minute long. The cast featured McNeil as Lennon, Sarraf as McCartney, Pring as Harrison, and Fidel as Starr. The special was filmed at Pechanga Resort & Casino on January 6, 2012. The special's production crew received an Emmy award on June 12, 2013, for "Special Events Coverage", with Travis Fox, founder of the special's producer, MindFox Productions, receiving the award on behalf of the production.

=== Fab Four Mania ===
Fab Four Mania was a theatrical residency that lasted from September 2005 to June 2008, performing various shows at several resorts in the Las Vegas strip. The Fab Four signed a four-year contract with Las Vegas to perform a full show six nights a week at various theaters, bringing the Fab Four to bring in several musicians to perform several shows a night, with some rotating each gig. The cast performed regularly at locations such as the Las Vegas Hilton, The Aladdin, The Sahara and The Riviera. Members included the Fab Four's founders who would interchange with other members such as; Steve Craig, Frankee Mendonça, Joe Bologna, Tony Felicetta, and Gavin Pring, the latter became a full time member of the Fab Four.

=== Wingsband ===
Formed by Ardavan Sarraf, Wingsband is a Paul McCartney and Wings tribute act that covers many of McCartney's biggest post-Beatles hits. The band features Ron McNeil (in 2016 Gilbert Bonilla) as Denny Laine, Michael Amador as Henry McCullough, and Rolo Sandoval as Joe English, plus a horn section led by Wendell Kelly (The Temptations, Stevie Wonder, Lionel Richie, Whitney Houston) and singer/songwriter Christine Rosander as Linda McCartney. Both Laurence Juber, Wings guitarist from 1978 to 1981, and Denny Seiwell, the original Wings drummer from 1971 to 1973, had performed with Wingsband at The Grove of Anaheim in Anaheim, CA.

==== Paul On The Run ====
In late 2025, Sarraf announced a new McCartney and Wings tribute act called Paul On The Run, diving into McCartney's entire catalogue including Wings and his solo career. The band once again features Christine Rosander as Linda McCartney, as well as Richard Hurtado on guitar, “Mad” Max Mazursky on drums (Rolo Sandoval as a substitute), Fab Four member Gavin Pring on guitar and bass, Alexis Angel on keys, guitar and bass, and a four-piece horn section led by Wendell Kelly. The band had its first performance at the Garden Amphitheatre in Garden Grove on July 18th, 2026.

=== George Harry's Son ===
George Harrison impersonator and Liverpool native, Gavin Pring, created a tribute act called "George Harry's Son" to celebrate Harrison's solo material, as well as his hits from the Beatle years. Pring has brought this act to the top Beatles music festivals, including the annual Beatleweek in Liverpool at the Mathew Street Festival and Abbey Road on the River in the United States.

=== The Monkee Men ===
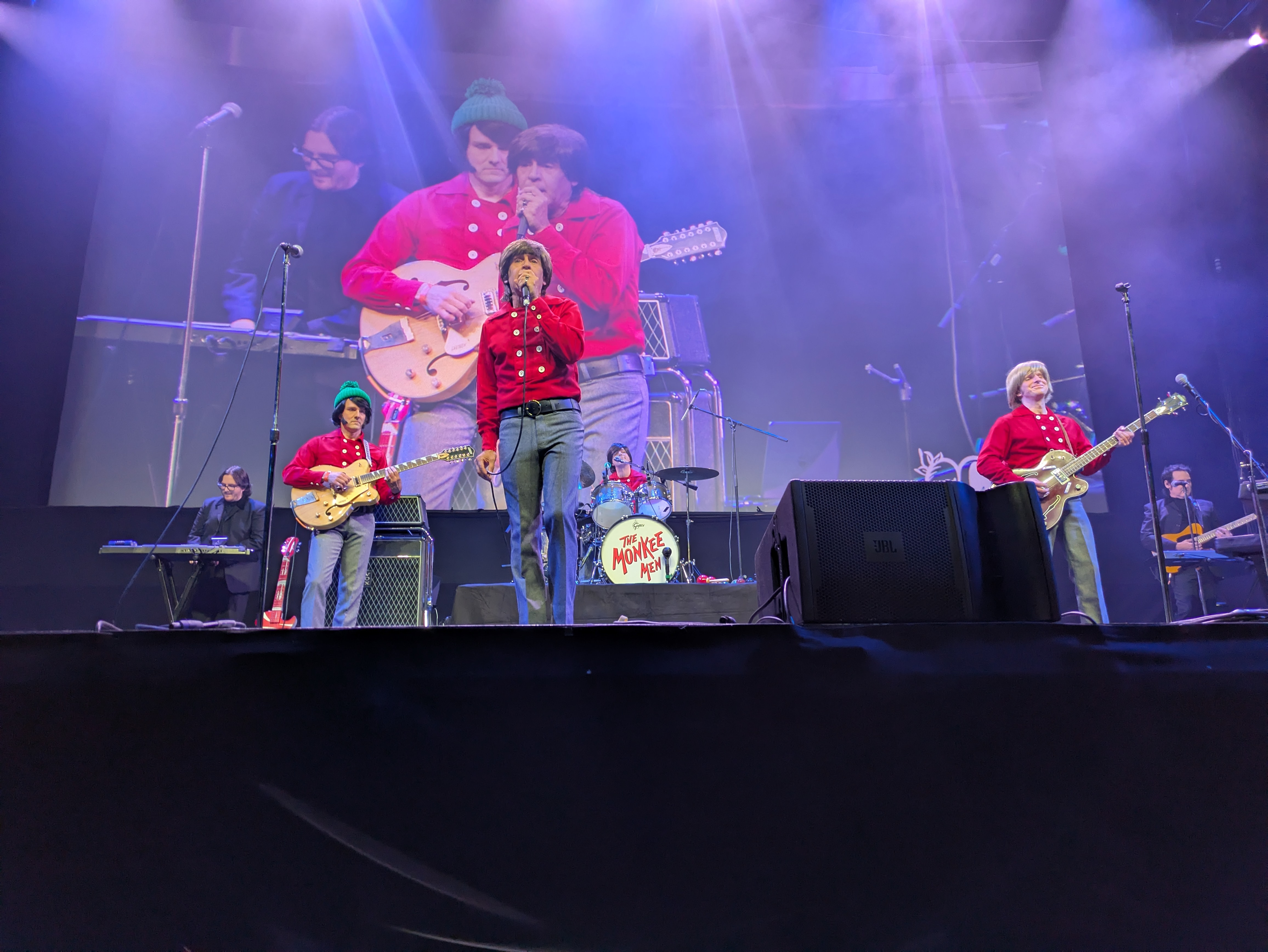
The Monkee Men performing at the Hangar at the Orange County Fair, Costa Mesa California, July 2025 From left to right: Matthew Hickman, Doug Couture (Mike), Frankee Mendonca (Davy), Joshua Jones (Micky), Jonathan Fickes (Peter), and Ron McNeil.

In Summer of 2020, McNeil decided to form a Monkees tribute band as he was a fan of the band growing up. Calling it The Monkee Men, the band covers most of The Monkees' original songs and the show is interactive. The Monkee Men originally performed as an opening act for the Fab Four in 2023 before they independently started touring nationwide starting in 2025. The band's original and current touring cast consists of McNeil's younger brother Frankee Mendonça as Davy Jones, Jonathan Fickes as Peter Tork, Doug Couture as Michael Nesmith, and Joshua Jones (Robbie Berg as substitute) as Micky Dolenz, with McNeil and Matthew Hickman providing backup support as the "5th and 6th Monkees", respectively. The band has been approved by Dolenz with his "full blessing" according to McNeil in an interview in August 2023.

=== 50 Summers of Love ===
In Summer of 2017, The Fab Four were approached by Micky Dolenz of The Monkees and Mark Lindsay of Paul Revere & the Raiders to perform a set of professional Off-Broadway performances celebrating the 50th anniversary of the Summer of Love for a nationwide tour called 50 Summers of Love from 2017 to 2018. Performing as the backup band, the performance first started with The Fab Four in their Sgt. Pepper's era before donning Raiders costumes, with Dolenz and Lindsay appearing to play both Monkees and Raiders hits, respectively. The lineup included McNeil as Lennon, Candelora as McCartney, Couture as Harrison/Nesmith, and Bologna as Starr. The premiere was on July 14, 2017, in San Diego, California, with Dolenz and Lindsay both reuniting onstage. Among the attendees was basketball legend Bill Walton.

=== Rutlemania ===
In 2007, The Fab Four were approached by Eric Idle from the British comedy group Monty Python to perform a set of professional Off-Broadway shows celebrating the 30th anniversary of The Rutles, a Beatles parody group formed in 1975 by Idle and Neil Innes. The show, Rutlemania, featured the band with McNeil as Ron Nasty (originally played by Innes), Sarraf as Dirk McQuickly (Idle), Amador as Stig O’Hara (Ricky Fataar) and Sandoval as Barry Wom (John Halsey), and was performed multiple nights in both Los Angeles and New York. Idle, Innes, Fataar, and Halsey attended the premiere at Grauman's Egyptian Theatre in Los Angeles on Saint Patrick's Day, 2008.

=== Yellow Submarine movie remake ===
In 2010, The Fab Four were cast to do the motion-capture performance footage for director Robert Zemeckis' 3D remake of The Beatles animated film classic, Yellow Submarine. The movie was set to be released sometime in the summer of 2012 in time for the 2012 London Summer Olympics, but Disney canceled the project when Zemeckis' film Mars Needs Moms performed poorly in the box office and critics' reviews of Zemeckis' animations were mostly negative.

== Notable appearances ==
- Opened for The Who at Carnegie Hall.
- Performed Bad Moon Rising with John Fogerty.
- Performed more than 50 times at The Cavern Club, one of the original venues the Beatles performed at.
- Performed at the City National Grove of Anaheim every March and November for over two decades.
- Performed as the featured event at a charity gala for Leukemia research for over 20 years in Fort Worth, Texas called the "Beatleukemia Ball". In 2005, they rose over $144,000 for Leukemia research and patient aid.
- Performed at the unveiling of The Londoner Macao on May 8th, 2019.
- Recorded Beatles tracks "I Want to Hold Your Hand", "Please Please Me" and "Kansas City" that were featured in the biopic The Linda McCartney Story in 2000.
- Performed at the Hollywood Bowl in 2003 for the 37th anniversary of the Beatles’ concerts there.
- Performed at the official DVD release party for the Miramax edition of A Hard Day’s Night at the Los Angeles House of Blues in 2002.
- Featured as a headlining act during Liverpool’s annual Beatleweek in 2004, 2008, 2011 and 2023.
- Featured on many TV shows and channels, including Entertainment Tonight, Good Morning America, Hallmark Channel and Ellen DeGeneres’ Really Big Show in 2007.
- Performed at the Laugh Factory at Long Beach, California in 2008.
- Performed the motion capture for the Harmonix video game The Beatles: Rock Band in 2009. (McNeil, Sarraf, Amador, and Sandoval).
- Featured (McNeil, Sarraf, Pring, and Fidel) in their own PBS special called The Fab Four: The Ultimate Tribute, filmed at Pechanga Resort & Casino in January 2012.
- Performed at Eric Idle's 40th wedding anniversary in 2002.
- Performed at Dave Grohl's wedding in 2003.
- Performed at an unveiling of Madame Tussaud's Beatles wax figures, when the figures were brought to Las Vegas from London for a short exhibit in 2012.
- Performed (Kelly, Candelora, Couture, and Bologna) at the Dodgers Stadium on August 26, 2016, at a pre game show before a game between the Los Angeles Dodgers and the Chicago Cubs in honour of the Beatles' 50th anniversary of performing at the stadium in 1966. They have also performed for Dodgers sportscaster Vin Scully.
- Performed (McNeil, Sarraf, Pring, and Bologna) the Sgt. Pepper's Lonely Hearts Club Band album in its entirety on The World's Greatest Tribute Bands on AXS TV, recorded live at the Whisky a Go Go in West Hollywood in May 2017.
- Performed yearly at the OC Fair on the first weekend of August at the Pacific Amphitheatre, often performing the entirety of several Beatles albums such as Sgt. Pepper and Magical Mystery Tour.
- Performed (McNeil, Mendonça, Pring, and Fidel) along with Alan Parsons, an assistance engineer during the Beatles' Get Back sessions in 2014.
- Performed (McNeil, Candelora, Berg, and Fidel) along with Bernie Hamburger, a luthier who created a guitar for George Harrison for the Anthology sessions in 1995, where Hamburger brought in a replica for Berg to use on the song "Real Love".
- Performed for Cynthia Lennon, Lennon's first wife, who said that the show "immediately brought back great memories."
- Performed (McNeil, Mendonça, Couture, Bologna, Jones, Fickes, and Hickman) with Micky Dolenz in 2022. McNeil, Mendonça, Couture, Jones, Fickes, and Hickman later became the founding members of The Monkee Men.
- Interviewed (McNeil, Sarraf, Pring, Sandoval, Mendonça, and Bonilla) on the weekly radio show Breakfast with the Beatles, hosted by Chris Carter in July 2013. They also performed on the rooftop of Carter's 50th birthday party at his house in 2009.

== Discography ==
- Ron McNeil – vocals, guitar, keyboards, harmonica
- Ardavan Sarraf – vocals, bass guitar, keyboards, guitar
- Michael Amador – vocals, lead guitar, keyboards, sitar
- Rolo Sandoval – vocals, drums, percussion

All songs were arranged, performed, recorded and produced by The Fab Four.

=== A Fab Four Christmas ===
Release Date - October 16, 2002
Label - Delta Ent. (LaserLight)

No.	Title	Based on	Length
1.	"Rudolph the Red-Nosed Reindeer" (Johnny Marks)	"I Saw Her Standing There"
2.	"Joy to the World" (Lowell Mason)	"Please Please Me" and "Little Child"
3.	"Feliz Navidad" (José Feliciano)	"And I Love Her"
4.	"Hark! The Herald Angels Sing" (Felix Mendelssohn)	"Help!"
5.	"Away in a Manger" (Traditional)	"You've Got to Hide Your Love Away"
6.	"Good King Wenceslas" (John Mason Neale)	"Tell Me What You See"
7.	"It Came Upon a Midnight Clear" (Edmund Sears)	"Baby's in Black"
8.	"Winter Wonderland" (Felix Bernard / Richard B. Smith)	"Honey Don't" and "Everybody's Trying to Be My Baby"
9.	"Frosty the Snowman" (Walter E. Rollins / Steve Nelson)	"Mr. Moonlight"
10.	"Let It Snow! Let It Snow! Let It Snow!" (Sammy Cahn / Jule Styne)	"Eight Days a Week"

=== Have Yourself a FAB-ulous Little Christmas ===
Release Date - October 16, 2002
Label - Delta Ent. (LaserLight)

No.	Title	Based on	Length
1.	"Santa Claus Is Coming to Town" (J. Fred Coots)	"When I'm Sixty Four" and "Honey Pie"
2.	"Silent Night" (Franz Gruber)	"Norwegian Wood (This Bird Has Flown)"
3.	"The Christmas Song" (Mel Torme)	"Here, There and Everywhere"
4.	"God Rest Ye Merry Gentlemen" (Traditional)	"Within You, Without You"
5.	"The Little Drummer Boy" (Katherine Davis)	"Sun King"
6.	"Dear Santa" (Richard Starkey / Mark Hudson / Steve Dudas)	"Oh! Darling"
7.	"What Child Is This?" (William Chatterton Dix)	"While My Guitar Gently Weeps"
8.	"Blue Christmas" (Billy Hayes)	"Revolution 1"
9.	"Rockin' Around the Christmas Tree" (Johnny Marks)	"Got to Get You Into My Life"
10.	"Jingle Bells" (James Lord Pierpont)	"Tomorrow Never Knows"

=== HARK! ===
Release Date - 2008
Label - Robo Records

- In 2008, all songs from both albums were digitally remastered and released on a single album entitled HARK!, available on Amazon, iTunes and The Fab Four's official website. The compilation includes the bonus tracks "Sleigh Ride" and "The First Noel", in the style of "Lady Madonna" and "Let It Be", respectively.

=== The Ultimate Beatles Tribute in Concert, Vol. 1 ===
Release Date - 2002/2011
Label - Self-released

- Recorded live at the Tomorrowland Terrace at Disneyland in the summer of 2001.

No.	Title	Length
1.	"Twist and Shout (Short Version)" (Phil Medley / Bert Berns)
2.	"Please Please Me" (John Lennon / Paul McCartney)	2:06
3.	"All My Loving" (Lennon / McCartney)	2:12
4.	"I Want to Hold Your Hand" (Lennon / McCartney)	2:24
5.	"From Me to You" (Lennon / McCartney)	2:03
6.	"Love Me Do" (Lennon / McCartney)	2:27
7.	"Do You Want to Know a Secret" (Lennon / McCartney)	2:01
8.	"Boys" (Luther Dixon / Wes Farrell)	2:31
9.	"You Really Got a Hold on Me" (Smokey Robinson)	2:57
10.	"This Boy" (Lennon / McCartney)	2:25
11.	"A Hard Day's Night" (Lennon / McCartney)	2:32
12.	"I Should Have Known Better" (Lennon / McCartney)	2:51
13.	"If I Fell" (Lennon / McCartney)	2:18
14.	"Eight Days a Week" (Lennon / McCartney)	2:48
15.	"Can't Buy Me Love" (Lennon / McCartney)	2:12
16.	"Act Naturally" (Buck Owens)	2:41
17.	"Help!" (Lennon / McCartney)	2:20
18.	"Michelle" (Lennon / McCartney)	3:00
19.	"I Feel Fine" (Lennon / McCartney)	2:28
20.	"Yesterday" (Lennon / McCartney)	2:12
21.	"She Loves You" (Lennon / McCartney)	2:20
22.	"Roll Over Beethoven" (Chuck Berry)	2:38
23.	"I Saw Her Standing There" (Lennon / McCartney)	3:33
24.	"Twist and Shout" (Medley / Berns)	2:49
25.	"Outro" (N/A)

=== TV Special Soundtrack ===
Release Date - 2013
Label - Self-released

- The soundtrack to the PBS special The Fab Four: The Ultimate Tribute, recorded live at Pechanga Resort & Casino on January 6, 2012. Available exclusively on CD at the Fab Four's official website.

==== Personnel ====
- Ron McNeil – Vocals, Guitar, Keyboards, Harmonica
- Ardavan Sarraf – Vocals, Bass, Keyboards, Guitar
- Gavin Pring – Vocals, Lead Guitar, Keyboards, Sitar
- Erik Fidel – Vocals, Drums, Percussion

No.	Title	Length
1.	"I Want to Hold Your Hand" (Lennon / McCartney)
2.	"All My Loving" (Lennon / McCartney)
3.	"A Hard Day's Night" (Lennon / McCartney)
4.	"Eight Days a Week" (Lennon / McCartney)
5.	"Can't Buy Me Love" (Lennon / McCartney)
6.	"Help!" (Lennon / McCartney)
7.	"She Loves You" (Lennon / McCartney)
8.	"I Saw Her Standing There" (Lennon / McCartney)
9.	"Twist and Shout" (Medley / Berns)
10.	"Yesterday" (Lennon / McCartney)
11.	"Sgt. Pepper's Lonely Hearts Club Band" (Lennon / McCartney)
12.	"With a Little Help From My Friends" (Lennon / McCartney)
13.	"Strawberry Fields Forever" (Lennon / McCartney)
14.	"Yellow Submarine" (Lennon / McCartney)
15.	"Sgt. Pepper's Lonely Hearts Club Band (Reprise)" (Lennon / McCartney)
16.	"A Day in the Life" (Lennon / McCartney)
17.	"Imagine" (Lennon)
18.	"Here Comes the Sun" (George Harrison)
19.	"Get Back" (Lennon / McCartney)
20.	"Revolution" (Lennon / McCartney)
21.	"Hey Jude" (Lennon / McCartney)
