= Rain: A Tribute to the Beatles =

Chronolgical concert dedicated to the Beatles band

Rain
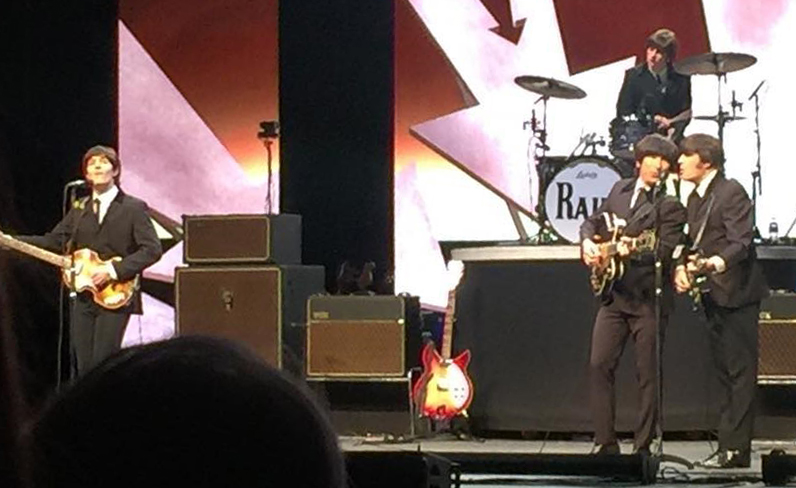
- Rain performing at the UIS Sangamon Auditorium, Springfield Illinois, March 2019; From left to right: Paul Curatolo (Paul), Aaron Chiazza (Ringo), Alastar McNeil (George), Steve Landes (John)

Background information
- Also known as: Reign
- Origin: Laguna Beach, California
- Genres: Rock and Roll; Beatles tribute
- Years active: 1975–present
- Label: None
- Members: Steve Landes; Paul Curatolo; Alastar McNeil; Dylan Verge; Mark Beyer
- Website: RainTribute.com

Rain
- A Tribute to the Beatles
- Playbill for the Broadway production
- Music: The Beatles
- Lyrics: The Beatles
- Basis: The career and music of the Beatles
- Premiere: 1975
- Productions: 2010 Broadway
- Awards: 2011 Drama Desk Award for Outstanding Revue

Rain: A Tribute to the Beatles, styled RAIN, is a Beatles tribute and later a theatrical production. It predates the popular Broadway show Beatlemania by several years Rain and has played Broadway, and toured for years.

The show takes the form of a roughly chronological history of the Beatles via their music. About 30 songs are performed during the show. Other than some onstage banter, there is very little dialogue during the production, which consists mostly of exact re-enactments of the Beatles' music. The multimedia production uses high-definition backdrops that feature psychedelic effects, vintage television commercials, and video footage of Rain cast members recreating iconic Beatle moments. For legal reasons, Rain never calls its performers the names of the actual members of the Beatles.

Each production of Rain features two performers for each member of the Beatles, who alternate shows; plus an off-stage keyboardist to replicate the studio sounds familiar from later Beatles records.

== History ==
Rain began in 1975 as Reign, a Laguna Beach, California, band that played both original music and Beatles covers. Founding members were Mark Lewis, Eddie Lineberry, Bill Connearney, Grant Belotti, Chuck Coffey, and Steve Wight. (Connearney, Belotti, Lineberry, and Alan Hawley had been members of a prior band known as Lucky Dogs.) The name of the band, "Reign/Rain," is a reference to the 1966 Beatles single "Rain," the B-side of "Paperback Writer."

Co-founder and keyboardist Mark Lewis managed the band, became its lead arranger, and found Rain a regular weekly gig doing Beatles covers at the Mine Shaft in Calabasas, California. Before long Rain had a following of Beatles fans around the Los Angeles/Orange County area, and soon extended up the West Coast as far as Seattle.

As the band developed a reputation, they performed at the 1978 Jerry Lewis MDA Labor Day Telethon. In 1979, producer Dick Clark hired Rain members to record exact Beatles covers for the Richard Marquand film Birth of the Beatles.

By 1980, Lewis had built the band into a long-standing touring tradition. The lineup of Rain remained constant until 1980, with Lineberry playing John Lennon, Coffey playing Paul McCartney, Connearney playing George Harrison, and Belotti playing Ringo Starr (with Lewis playing keyboards behind the scenes). Joey Curatolo joined Rain in 1978, sharing the role of Paul with Coffey; Curatolo is still a current member of Rain.

Lineberry left Rain in 1980, and Coffey, Connearney, and Belotti all left in 1982. Joe Bithorn joined the group as "George" in 1983, and is still with Rain. Ralph Castell joined Rain in 1986 as Ringo, and is still with the show.

In 2001 the Rain Corporation took over management of the band. In 2005, management met with producer Jeff Parry to expand the tribute band's scope — which at that point was mostly doing concerts at casinos — and develop a Broadway-style production in the manner of 1977's Beatlemania. The result of this planning eventually became the 2010 Broadway run.

In 2008, Pollstar listed Rain at number 17 in its yearly "Pollstar's Hot Top 20" for overall tickets sales of a touring show, band, or production.

Rain played Hollywood's Pantages Theatre in 2009. In 2010 the production performed at Kansas City's Starlight Theatre and New Orleans' Mahalia Jackson Theater of the Performing Arts.

In 2009, on the eve of Rain moving to Broadway, the Rain Corporation and Parry's Annerin Productions agreed to produce a West End theatre version of the show, with both sides splitting the profits 50-50.

Rain ran on Broadway for 300 shows (and 8 preview performances), first at the Neil Simon Theatre on October 26, 2010 – January 15, 2011, then at the Brooks Atkinson Theatre on February 8, 2011 – July 31, 2011. They were interviewed by Good Morning America in 2011, and also rang the NYSE bell in March 2011.

In 2012, Parry/Annerin Productions put on Let It Be, a Beatles "concert experience" that played in London's West End. In 2013, on the eve of Let It Be coming to Broadway, the Rain Corporation filed a copyright suit against Parry and his fellow Let It Be producers. Rain claimed that Let It Be was essentially the same concept as Rain, with similar artwork, costumes, and virtually the same song repertoire, and that Rain was entitled to 50% of Let It Be's profits. Parry and Annerin instead proposed giving Rain Corporation 7.5% of their profits. The case was settled out of court.

In November 2025, Rain began touring with a show called "Rain - A Beatles Christmas Tribute", interspersing holiday songs with their Beatles covers.

== Synopsis ==
The show begins with the four actors portraying an early version of the Beatles' appearance at the Cavern Club in 1962. When this scene closes, the Beatles journey to America, beginning their tour at The Ed Sullivan Show. Moving forward, the Beatles' directions are changing musically while their band grows in popularity performing their largest concert at New York City's Shea Stadium. Subsequent scenes use hallucinogenic and psychedelic designs to represent the Beatles' ever increasing experimentation with substances and Eastern philosophies. The show culminates with the breakup of the group and the end of the 1960s.

== Cast members ==
=== "John Lennon" ===
- Eddie Lineberry (1974–1980) — recorded songs for the film Birth of the Beatles
- Randy Clark (1980–1981) — also appeared in Beatlemania
- Jim Riddle (1983–1997) — also appeared in Beatlemania; died 1997
- Jimmy Irizarry (2011–2016). Currently a member of American English. Also played with Cavern Beat.
- David Leon (2009–2011). Played John in Beatlemania: the movie.
- Tim Piper (2009–2011)
- Steve Landes (1998–present, current) — originally from Philadelphia; also appeared in Beatlemania at age 17. Also played with the Fab Four.

=== "Paul McCartney" ===
- Chuck Coffey (1974–1980) — recorded songs for Birth of the Beatles; died 2021
- Glenn Burtnik (1980–1982)
- Robert "Mac" Ruffing — (2009–2011) also played with 1964 the Tribute and Beatlemania
- Graham Alexander (2010–2011) — originally from New Jersey; member of the 2010 Broadway production. Also played with 1964 the tribute and Let It Be.
- Alan LaBoeuf (2009)
- Ardy Sarraf (2011). Currently a member of the Fab Four.
- Ian B. Garcia — (2012–2016) native of Viña del Mar, Chile
- Joey Curatolo (1978–2016) — originally from Brooklyn; toured with the Broadway production of Beatlemania; father of Paul Curatolo now works as musical director
- Paul Curatolo (2013–present, current) — originally from Reno; son of Joey Curatolo; member of the pop band Wayward; plays left-handed like McCartney

=== "George Harrison" ===
- Bill Connearney (1974–1982) — recorded songs for Birth of the Beatles; died 2009
- Tom Teeley (2009–2011) — toured with Beatlemania, 1964 and Classical Mystery Tour
- Jimmy Pou (2009–2011) — originally from Miami; also performed with Beatlemania and 1964 – The Tribute.
- Joe Bithorn (1983–2016) — originally from New York; toured with Beatlemania
- Alastar McNeil (2016–present, current) — native of Oahu, Hawaii; member of the band Kupa'aina. His grand-aunt was Broadway chorus dancer Ruth Sato.

=== "Ringo Starr" ===
- Grant Belotti (1974–1982) — died 2007.
- Bobby Taylor (1980–1985), also appeared in Beatlemania.
- Steve Wight (1979) — recorded songs for Birth of the Beatles.
- Chris McBurney (2009–2011), also played with Let It Be.
- Ralph Castelli (1986–2016) — originally from Southern California; toured with Beatlemania; played Ringo in Beatlemania: The Movie.
- Aaron Chiazza (2014–2023) — former member of Paul Curatolo's band Wayward.
- Dylan Verge (2024–present, current), also performed with Studio Two.
- Joseph Bologna (2008–2011), also performed with The Fab Four and 1964: The Tribute, among others. Originally from Detroit, Michigan, was nicknamed "Broadway Joe" for his involvement in the Broadway musical.
- Douglas Cox (2008–2011).

=== Keyboards / percussion ===
- Mark Lewis (1975–present) — founding member and musical arranger of Rain; retired from performing in 2010 to concentrate on managing the show
- Mark Beyer (2010–present)
- Chris Smallwood — originally from Kentucky
- John Korba (2011)
