= Fran Smith Jr. =

American rock musician

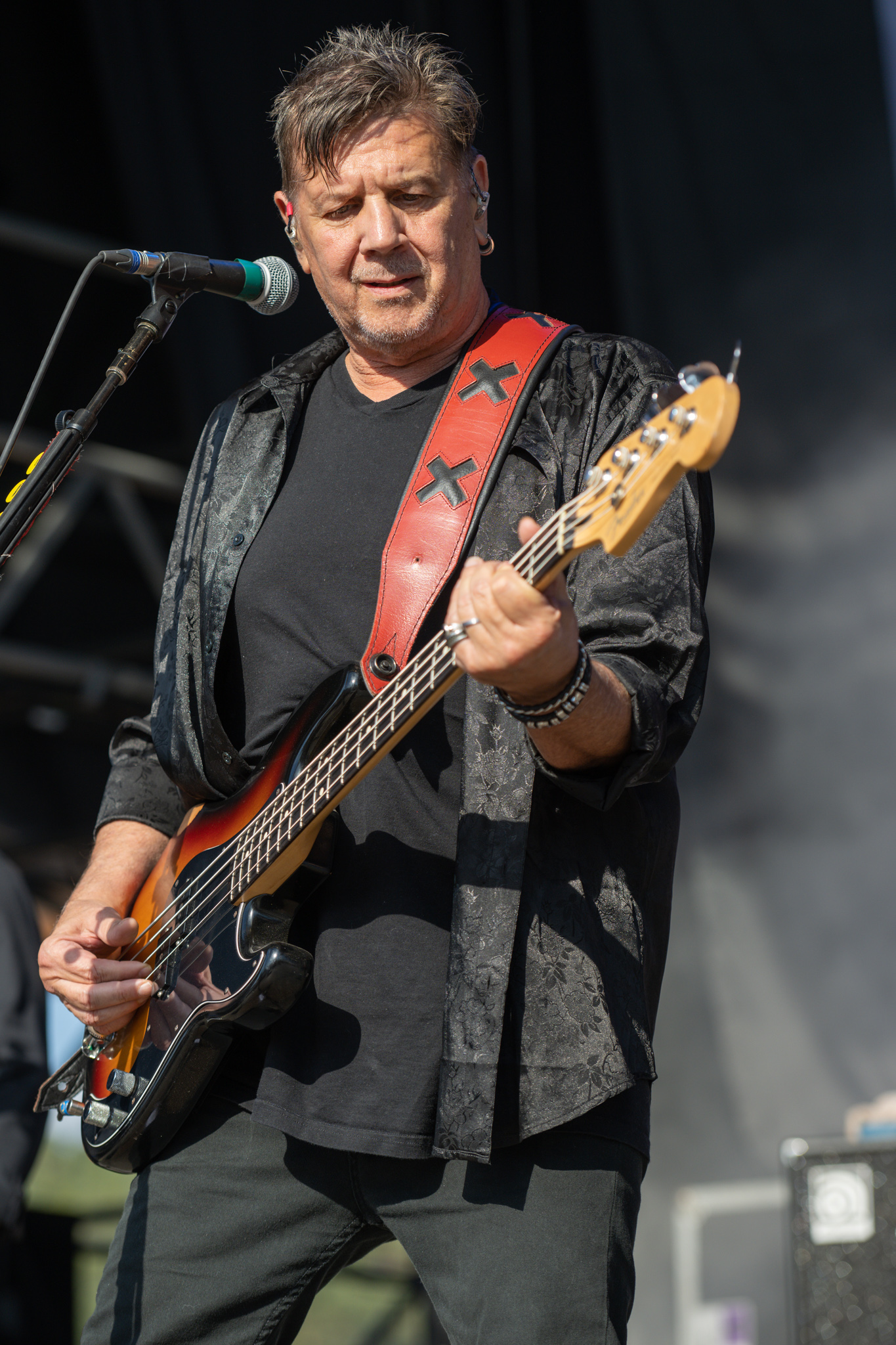
- Smith performing with The Hooters in 2022.

Background information
- Born: July 17, 1952 (age 74); Philadelphia, Pennsylvania, U.S.
- Genre: Rock
- Occupations: Musician, record producer
- Instruments: Bass, vocals
- Years active: 1978–present
- Member of: The Hooters

Fran Smith Jr. (born July 17, 1952) is an American bass guitarist and vocalist, best known for his 30-year gig with the Philadelphia-based rock group The Hooters. Smith has also maintained a career as a recording artist in his own right, as well as a producer for other artists.

Smith has toured as Paul McCartney in Beatlemania, a celebration of The Beatles. He also played the part of Carlo Cannoli in Tony and Tina's Wedding, a long running off-Broadway comedy. From his own recording studio he has produced many successful projects for artists such as Joe Piscopo and Flo & Eddie of The Turtles.

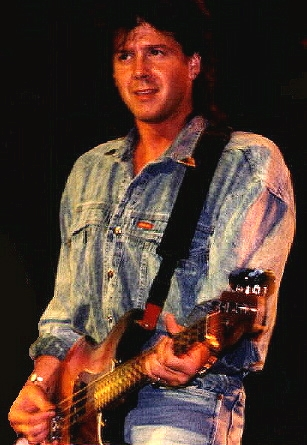
Fran Smith Jr. at The Spectrum in 1988

In 1995, Smith released the solo CD For No Apparent Reason, as Rory Kunkle.

In 2005, he released Man Meets Machine, Fran Smith Jr and the Ten Cent Millionaires

In 2016, he released Mystic County on his son Graham Alexander's Odeon label.

== Discography ==
- Johnny's Dance Band – Love Wounds, Flesh Wounds (1978 – Windsong Records) (Vinyl Only – No CD)
- Nan Mancini & JDB – It's A Man's World (1979 – Windsong Records) (Vinyl Only – No CD)
- The Hooters – Zig Zag (1989 – Columbia Records)
- Roger Waters ("The Wall") Live in Berlin -- (July 21, 1990)
- The Hooters – Out Of Body (1993 – MCA Records)
- The Hooters – Live! In Germany (1994 – MCA Records) (European Only CD Release)
- Rory Kunkle (Fran Smith Jr.) – For No Apparent Reason (1995)
- Largo – Largo (1998) – Mercury Records
- "Beyond the Palace", chapter reference dedicated to Fran Smith Jr., -- (author, Gary Wein -- release date May, 2003)
- Fran Smith Jr. & The Ten Cent Millionaires – Man Meets Machine (2005)
- The Hooters – Time Stand Still (Neo Records – 2007 European Release)
  (Megaforce / MRI Associated Labels – 2008 USA Release)
- The Hooters – Five By Five (Neo Records -2010 Release)
- Fran Smith Jr – Mystic County 2016
- "The Goldbergs" series, appearance on the episode entitled, "The Hooters" -- (original air date January 17, 2018)

*The Hooters were also honored with induction to The Philadelphia "Walk of Fame" -- (October 23, 2019)

== Other contributions ==
- Blake Thompson – Blake Thompson (5 Song CD EP) (1990) TC Records – (Fran Smith Jr. – Bass Guitar)
- Glen Burtnik – Palookaville (1996) Deko Records (Fran Smith Jr. – Background Vocals)
- Orange & Black – Baldwin Drive (2008) Zip Records (Fran Smith Jr. – Bass)
- Scott Philipp – Just Another Day (2008) Joint Chiefs Records (Fran Smith Jr. – Adviser to Craig Simon producer)
- Craig Simon and the vintage "The test of time" (2012) Fran Smith Jr. Bass
- Smash Palace, Extended Play, Live from the Auction House
- Dar Williams – Emerald
- David Uosikkinen – In The Pocket-Sessions, In The Pocket Live
- Graham Alexander – Repeat Deceiver, Graham Alexander
- TJ Tindall – TJ Tindall's East Coast
- Clayton West
- Livvie Forbes – CHRONIC 2016
