= Roger Hane =

American illustrator (1939–1974)

- Born: January 3, 1939; Bradford, Pennsylvania, U.S.
- Died: June 17, 1974 (aged 35); New York City, U.S.
- Known for: illustration
- Notable work: Chronicles of Narnia paperback covers, The Tripods paperback covers
- Awards: Artist of the Year (1974), the New York Artists Guild

Roger T. Hane (January 3, 1939 – June 17, 1974) was an illustrator of paperback books, commercial advertising campaigns, and record albums, known for his surreal, fanciful art. During his eleven-year professional career, Hane produced over three hundred illustrations. He painted the covers of the Collier-Macmillan editions of C.S. Lewis's Chronicles of Narnia books, as well as such Simon & Schuster publications as Carlos Castaneda's The Teachings of Don Juan and A Separate Reality. He also created artwork for Avon Books, E.P. Dutton Company, and Collier Books.

== Biography ==
Hane was born in Bradford, Pennsylvania and grew up in Bradford's Third Ward. He graduated from Bradford High School in 1956. He studied at the Maryland Institute of Art, and graduated from the Philadelphia Museum School of Art (now The University of the Arts) with a degree in advertising design in 1961.

In 1963, Hane was hired to do a full-page illustration for Esquire magazine; he moved to New York in 1965. He married Elaine Miller in 1964. Among his many magazine clients were Ladies Home Journal, Life, Esquire, Sports Illustrated, Fortune, New York magazine, Redbook, The Lamp, Look, Vista, the Saturday Review, Travel and Leisure, Look, Sylvania, Ramparts, the National Lampoon, and Playboy.

Hane also contributed work to such advertising clients as Formica, Sylvania Bulbs, De Beers Diamonds, BMI, Merck Sharp & Dohme, Inc.; and he designed a number of record album covers for RCA, Columbia Records, and Philadelphia International Records.

Hane died in New York City at age 35 as a result of a robbery and beating in Central Park.

Mr. Hane was posthumously awarded the New York Artist Guild’s Artist of the Year Award in 1974, and his work was featured in the Society of Illustrators’ 1977 publication. The Philadelphia College of Art gives an annual Roger T. Hane Memorial Award to the student with the year's top illustration portfolio.

== Selected bibliography ==
=== Book covers and inside illustrations ===
Roger Hane's cover for the 1970 Collier-Macmillan edition of C. S. Lewis's The Lion, the Witch, and the Wardrobe.

- The Morality of Poetry, by John Ciardi. (Illustrated paper covered boards. 9 leaves. No place: no date.)
- The Bible Smugglers, by Louise A. Vernon (Herald Press, 1967)
- Mohawk, The Life of Joseph Brant, by John Jakes (Crowell-Collier, 1969)

=== Book covers only ===
- Flandry of Terra, by Poul Anderson, (Chilton, 1965)
- World In The Making series (Crowell-Collier, 1965–68)
  - Marconi, Father of the Radio, by David Gunston, 1965
  - Cobra in the Sky: The Supersonic Transport, by Edward A. Herron, 1968
  - The Search for Atlantis, by Henry Chapin, 1968
- Ensign Flandry, Poul Anderson (Chilton, 1966)
- The Viaduct, by Roy Brown (Macmillan, 1967)
- The Tripods, by John Christopher (Collier, 1967–68)
  - The White Mountains, 1967
  - The City of Lead and Gold, 1967
  - The Pool of Fire, 1968
- The Man Who Founded Georgia: The Story Of James Edward Oglethorpe, by J. Gordon Vaeth (Crowell-Collier, 1968)
- The Varieties of Man: An Introduction to Human Races, by Edward Babun (Crowell-Collier Press, 1969)
- Sudden Iron, by John Clarke (McGraw-Hill 1969)
- The Rock Revolution: What's Happening in Today's Music, by Arnold Shaw (Crowell-Collier Press, 1969)
- Avon Classic Crime Collection (1969–1971)
  - Dead Cert, by Dick Francis, 1969
  - It Walks by Night, by John Dickson Carr, 1970
  - Beat Not the Bones, by Charlotte Jay, 1970
  - Maigret in Vichy, by Georges Simenon, 1971
- The Chronicles of Narnia, by C. S. Lewis (Collier-Macmillan, 1970)
  - The Lion, The Witch and the Wardrobe
  - Prince Caspian
  - The Voyage of the Dawn Treader
  - The Silver Chair
  - The Horse and His Boy
  - The Magician's Nephew
  - The Last Battle
- One of Fred’s Girls, by Elisabeth Hamilton Friermood (Doubleday, 1970)
- Under the Moons of Mars, edited by Sam Moskowitz (Holt Rinehart Wilson, 1970)
- Sagittarius, by Ray Russell (Playboy Science Fiction/Fantasy, 1970)
- Addie Pray, by Joe David Brown (Simon & Schuster, 1971). [Later retitled Paper Moon to tie in with the film adaptation.]
- A Separate Reality: Further Conversations With Don Juan, by Carlos Castaneda (Simon & Schuster, 1971)
- The Death of the Great Spirit, An Elegy for the American Indian, by Earl Shorris (Simon & Schuster, 1971)
- The Fiend, by various authors (Playboy Science Fiction, 1971)
- Journey to Ixtlan, by Carlos Castaneda (Simon & Schuster, 1972)
- The Guardians, by John Christopher (Collier, 1972)
- Beyond Apollo, by Barry N. Malzberg (Random House, 1972)
- The Teachings of Don Juan: a Yaqui Way of Knowledge, by Carlos Castaneda (Simon & Schuster, 1973)
- The Seduction of the Spirit: The Use and Misuse of People's Religion, by Harvey Cox (Simon and Schuster, 1973)
- Narrow Exit, by Paul Henissart (Simon & Schuster, 1973)
- Blood Sport: A Journey Up the Hassayampa, by Robert F. Jones (Simon & Schuster, 1974)

== Album covers ==
- Annie Get Your Gun studio album with Doris Day and Robert Goulet
- Joshua Rifkin, The Baroque Beatles Book (Elektra/Nonesuch, 1965)
- Bach, Brandenburg Concertos, by Ristenpart
- Joseph Haydn, Die Jahreszeiten
- Handel, Judas Maccabaeus
- Billy Paul, Going East
- Billy Paul, War of the Gods
- B. C. & M. Choir, Hello Sunshine
- Cream, "Good Bye"
- Glenn Gould - Bach: Well-Tempered Clavier Book 2, Vol.3 17-24 Columbia
