= Beatle Country =

1966 studio album by Charles River Valley Boys

Studio album by Charles River Valley Boys
- Released: November 1966
- Recorded: September 1966
- Studio: Columbia (Nashville, Tennessee)
- Genre: Bluegrass
- Length: 33:22
- Label: Elektra
- Producer: Paul A. Rothchild; Peter K. Siegel

Charles River Valley Boys chronology
Blue Grass Get Together (1964)	Beatle Country (1966)	Bluegrass and Old Timey Music (2003)

Alternative cover
- 1995 CD release

Beatle Country is the fourth and final studio album by the American bluegrass band Charles River Valley Boys, released in November 1966 by Elektra Records. Where the Charles River Valley Boys' previous albums consisted of traditional and new bluegrass and some early country songs, Beatle Country contains only covers of the Beatles. The band and several session musicians completed the album at Columbia Studios in Nashville, Tennessee, across four days in September 1966. Paul A. Rothchild and Peter K. Siegel produced the album, with Glenn Snoddy as audio engineer.

After hearing the Beatles' song "I've Just Seen a Face" on the radio in late 1965, Jim Field recommended to his bandmates that they add it to their repertoire. Following the label's success the previous year with The Baroque Beatles Book, Elektra executive Jac Holzman acquired permission for the group to record an album of Beatles covers. Because the original versions often employ complex chord progressions, the group "'countrified' the chords ... 'flattening'" them out to bring the songs into the style of bluegrass. In addition to using rolling banjos, upright bass and a high lonesome tenor vocal, they further changed the songs structurally, allowing for extra instrumental breaks – a typical feature of bluegrass music, where each musician is allowed the chance to solo.

Upon release, Elektra promoted Beatle Country towards mainstream country and pop music audiences rather than to bluegrass fans. A commercial failure, it peaked at No. 127 on Cash Box's Top 100 Albums chart in January 1967. The album's ineffective marketing campaign allowed it to fall into obscurity, subsequently attaining cult status and becoming a valued collector's item. The album's cover artwork, created by Eros Keith under the supervision of William S. Harvey and without the band's involvement, features a group of cowboys gazing at the theater district of Swinging London. With its bending of bluegrass conventions, retrospective commentators have seen the LP as anticipating the progressive bluegrass movement of the 1970s. The album was re-released on CD in 1995 and in 2005.

== Background ==
The Charles River Valley Boys formed in the late 1950s in Cambridge, Massachusetts, with young musicians meeting at a local coffee house, Tulla's Coffee Grinder, to jam together. One of the first urban, northern United States bluegrass bands to form, the group focused on Appalachian, classic bluegrass and early country music. Music scholar Laura Turner comments that "[t]he band's sound, repertoire, and intellectual acumen fit perfectly into the larger concept of folk revival – city-based youths seeking the sounds of a supposedly 'authentic' America". In the early 1960s, they became popular in Boston and within the Cambridge folk scene, performing regularly on Harvard College's WHRB radio station and at local coffee houses and folk clubs, including Club 47.

The Charles River Valley Boys recorded parts of their first album, Bringin' in the Georgia Mail (1962), in London in July 1961. Banjoist Bob Siggins later recalled that they were well received as they toured pubs and folk clubs in London, and that "[we] did get a little flavor of pre-Beatles London at the time ... there were a lot of great musicians bubbling up all around us while we toured ... we heard rumors about [the Beatles] in Germany and how great they were". After returning to America, the band encountered Paul A. Rothchild, then an advocate of folk music and a frequenter of the Cambridge folk scene in the early 1960s. Attending Club 47, a performance by the Charles River Valley Boys enthralled Rothchild, who offered to produce an album for the group. The result, Bluegrass and Old Timey Music (1962), along with the subsequent Blue Grass Get Together (1964), mostly consisted of traditional and new bluegrass songs and some early country songs.

[The Beatles] had a lot of country twang in songs like "I've Just Seen a Face" and "What Goes On". A lot of the folkies were into the Beatles big time, on the sly if nothing else, including us. We just thought a lot of [their songs] would adapt themselves to a country sound. As we got into learning the songs, we discovered that the singing they did lent itself well to bluegrass harmonies, and we discovered we liked the ones that weren't so country too.

– Bob Siggins, 2001

In the lead up to the 6 December 1965 release of the Beatles' album Rubber Soul, the Charles River Valley Boys' guitarist, Jim Field, recalled hearing "I've Just Seen a Face" on the radio and thinking "it instantly felt like bluegrass". (Note: In keeping with the company's policy of reconfiguring the Beatles' albums, Capitol Records omitted "I've Just Seen a Face" and other tracks from the North American version of Help!, issuing it instead on the North American version of Rubber Soul.) In particular, the I–vi–IV–V chord progression of the verses and the chorus beginning on the dominant had "a drive perfectly suited for a straight-ahead bluegrass trio". Siggins added: "I think the instantaneous 'feel' of the song was the tipoff for me ... [a]dditionally, the lyrics could easily be (and in fact became) bluegrass lyrics".

With their usual set list made up of old and new bluegrass and country songs, the band added an arrangement of "I've Just Seen a Face" to their set, along with the country-inflected Beatles song "What Goes On". (Note: Having been omitted from the North American version of Rubber Soul, Capitol first released "What Goes On" in the US on 21 February 1966 as the B-side to "Nowhere Man". Both sides of the single were later included on the June 1966 album "Yesterday" ... and Today.) Performing the covers in February 1966 at the War Memorial Auditorium during Boston's Winterfest, the band received a positive reception from the 5,600-person audience. On the strength of this performance, they sent a demo recording of four songs – two of which were Beatles covers – to Rothchild, now working at Elektra Records. The previous year, the company sold over 150,000 copies of a novelty record of Baroque style Beatles covers, The Baroque Beatles Book, arranged by conductor Joshua Rifkin. With the commercial success of this LP in mind, record company executive Jac Holzman granted permission for the Charles River Valley Boys and Rothchild to record an album-length collection of Beatles covers.

== Recording ==
Recording for Beatle Country took place over four days in September 1966 at Columbia Studios in Nashville, Tennessee. The album was produced by Rothchild and Peter K. Siegel and engineered by Glenn Snoddy. Siegel recalled that Rothchild chose the studio because it was where Bob Dylan had recorded his 1966 album, Blonde on Blonde, and thought it would provide an authentic bluegrass sound. The previous month, Beatles rhythm guitarist John Lennon's controversial comment that the Beatles were "more popular than Jesus" provoked indignation among American Southerners. Despite the furor, Siggins and Field recalled that it had no impact on their project.

Having undergone several personnel changes in the years prior, the Charles River Valley Boys' 1966 line up consisted of Siggins on banjo, Field on guitar, Joe Val on mandolin and Everett A. Lilly on upright bass, with the first three also providing vocals. Siegel described this group as "the strongest, most uniform bluegrass band sound that the Charles River Valley Boys had ever achieved". While the rest of the group were enthusiastic about the album's concept, Val, the oldest and most experienced of the group, was initially hesitant. Siggins recalls that Val "slowly got into it" and that "the clincher was that we did it in a great Nashville studio". Propelled by the group's fears that their fans would accuse them of selling out, Siggins recalled they attempted to record the songs "as hard-core bluegrass as we could".

Complementing the Charles River Valley Boys were several session musicians, including Nashville fiddler Buddy Spicher, West Virginia dobro player Craig Wingfield and California guitarist Eric Thompson. The session musicians were not informed of the album's concept so as to maintain secrecy and prevent another record company from releasing a similar cover album. Siegel recalled the recording process as efficient and professional, with the group recording fourteen covers in the four days. Rothchild and Siegel mixed the album in Elektra's New York studio, correcting small mistakes not noticed in Nashville and selecting twelve songs for inclusion.

== Songs ==
Hearing those songs ("Norwegian Wood" and "I Saw Her Standing There") sung in the style and timbre of Bill Monroe ... sent chills down my spine. Hearing that voice come through the monitors, I felt like Joe [Val] was achieving an essential melding of the Beatles songs and the bluegrass style, and it's something I'll never forget.

– Peter K. Siegel, 2015

The Beatles' songs the Charles River Valley Boys selected for the album varied chronologically from the December 1963 B-side "I Saw Her Standing There" to the August 1966 A-side "Yellow Submarine". Some picks were from the Beatles' latest and increasingly experimental releases, which Turner writes allowed the album to serve "as a contemporary bluegrass commentary on the growing experimentalism of the Beatles songbook". Several display complex chord progression that exist outside of the harmonic standards of bluegrass; in arranging them, Field recalled a process whereby they "intentionally 'countrified' the chords ... flattening [them] out a little bit". Turner mentions several bluegrass motifs being worked in across the album, such as: "the rhythmic impetus and timbre of the 'rolling' banjo motifs, persistently driving upright bass, occasional utilization of vocal techniques like Val's 'high lonesome' tenor, and an abundance of solo instrumental breaks".

The structural changes are incorporated on the album's opening track, "I've Just Seen a Face", later characterized by Field as the foundation piece of the entire album. Where the original includes only one instrumental break for a guitar solo, the cover adds extra breaks for banjo, mandolin and fiddle – a typical feature of bluegrass music, where each musician is allowed the chance to solo. Additionally, the original includes only one chorus, not including its final iteration, while the cover repeats the chorus twice. Turner opines that this serves to emphasize the "quintessential bluegrass technique" of close three-part harmonies. She describes the biggest differences between versions as consisting in their different textures and timbres, and in particular the Charles River Valley Boys' "incessant, 'walking' upright bass line that provides energetic drive, sparking mandolin tremolo, rolling banjo figures, and intricate, often double-stopped fiddle motifs that permeate the texture".

Joe Val's first verse from "Norwegian Wood"
According to music scholar Laura Turner, Joe Val's emphasis on the rhotic "r" and his "representative bluegrass high tenor range" signal "American southernness".

The band's cover of "Yellow Submarine" incorporates several sound effects added during the mixing process in New York, including ricochet gunfire and a mechanical wind-up toy. Sung in a comic tone by Siggins, he recalled that they tried to make it sound "as corny as possible ... kind of like an old hee-haw movie". Siggins adapted his singing style to sound like the banjoist and entertainer Uncle Dave Macon, changing the pronunciation of "yellow submarine" to "yeller submarine". He further recalled: "We often stress the word 'yeller' to this day, to make it even cornier, as in the 'old yeller' dog name".

The Charles Valley River Boys' version of "Norwegian Wood" transposes from the original modal E to a modal A. (Note: Though the song's true title is "Norwegian Wood (This Bird Has Flown)", the liner notes of Beatle Country title it "Norwegian Wood".) In place of the original guitar-sitar intro is a mandolin tremolo. Val's first vocal is joined by a banjo that emphasizes the song's triple meter. Siegel compares the vocal to that of bluegrass musician Bill Monroe, in particular Monroe's rendition of the murder ballad "Roane County Prison", a traditional song from the Upper Cumberland area of Tennessee sometimes known as "In the Hills of Roane County".

== Release ==
Elektra released Beatle Country in November 1966, and a 4-track cartridge release followed in March 1967. (Note: An article in the 26 November 1966 issue of Cash Box writes, "Elektra has released" the album, implying it was on sale by that date.) After hearing the album, Beatles bassist Paul McCartney sent a letter to the label expressing his appreciation of it. The LP was a commercial failure, peaking at No. 127 on Cash Box's Top 100 Albums chart in January 1967. Critic Stephen L. Betts credits the release's commercial failure to Elektra's weak marketing campaign. Rather than marketing the album towards bluegrass fans, they instead focused on mainstream country and pop music audiences, sending copies of the album to 2,225 radio stations that programmed "even an hour of country music". Siegel reflects that Elektra likely desired to extend the album's sales to beyond the small bluegrass market, but the strategy instead confused both country and bluegrass fans.

Overseen by William S. Harvey, then the art director of Elektra, Eros Keith created the album's cover artwork. The image depicts a group of cowboys "psychedelically clad", looking out at the theater district of Swinging London. Created without the band's involvement, they were unhappy with the result, with Siggins recalling "we were as shocked as anyone!" Field explained that he interpreted the art as the label's attempt to expand beyond the bluegrass market: "they didn't want to put pictures of us holding banjos and mandolins and stuff like that because everyone would have said 'oh, it's bluegrass, I don't like bluegrass.'"

=== Reissues ===
When Rounder re-released the album on CD on 23 March 1995, the cover art was changed to be closer to the bands original expectations, depicting a sepia-toned group of bluegrass musicians in suits. Siggins stated that the updated cover shows "what [we] thought were Beatles clothes ... or 'mod' English clothes". Collectors' Choice Music reissued the album on CD in 2005, releasing it alongside 14 other rare albums from Elektra's archives. (Note: While Turner writes the album was released in 2005, a contemporary Billboard article stated it and the other 14 rare albums were slated for release on 21 February 2006.) Both CD releases resulted in a short burst of sales. Elektra included the cover of "She's a Woman" on the 2007 compilation album Forever Changing: The Golden Age of Elektra 1963–1973.

== Reception ==
=== Contemporary reviews ===
Cash Box described the album as "[a] delightful Bluegrass romp" and predicted it would be a success among Beatles fans, while also having good chances in the country and western market. The review named five tracks as the album's highlights, including: "What Goes On", "Norwegian Wood", "I've Just Seen a Face", "Ticket to Ride" and "Yellow Submarine". Billboard magazine called the album "[a] novel idea" and suggested the covers of "Baby's in Black" and "Norwegian Wood" had the potential to gain airplay on both pop and country radio stations.

In a review for Bluegrass Unlimited magazine, Neil V. Rosenberg described Val's mandolin playing as the album's "outstanding feature". Applauding the breaks on "What Goes On" and "Help!", Rosenberg characterizes Val's playing as "clean, uncluttered, [and] a distinctive style with great feeling". He calls the singing on "I Saw Her Standing There" "forced", while describing "Norwegian Wood" as the high point of the album in terms of both its vocal and instrumental performance. He further praises Spicher and Wingfield's contributions, while also lauding Siggins for his humorous arrangement of "Yellow Submarine". He concludes that the album is "more interesting than captivating" and finds "Norwegian Wood" the only cover on the album which "stands on its own as a great bluegrass performance".

=== Retrospective assessment ===
Retrospective professional ratings
Review scores
Source	Rating
AllMusic	3/5 stars
MusicHound Folk (Betts)	4/5
MusicHound Folk (Walters)	3/5

Reviewing the album's 1995 CD release for CMJ New Music Monthly magazine, Andrea Moed writes that in hindsight the LP was "visionary ... foreshadowing both the 'newgrass' movement of the '70s and the pop stylings of people like Mike Nesmith". She remarks that the playing on "She's a Woman" and "Help!" display a "technical virtuosity [that] almost makes you forget the songs' origins". Reviewing the same release for the Chicago Tribune, Tom Popson suggests the covers point to either the "universality in Beatles material or the Charles River Valley Boys' skill at adaptation – or both". He concludes that the album is "more a pleasant diversion than tour-de-force", writing that while "Norwegian Wood" is a good adaption, "Ticket to Ride" and "Help!" "seem ungainly in their new context".

In a retrospective assessment for the MusicHound Folk album guide, Stephen L. Betts scored the album a four out of five. He compares the cover of "Yellow Submarine" to the sound of American country music duo Homer and Jethro. He comments that the songs chosen work well for bluegrass, and that the album "perhaps ... works because it was done at the height of Beatlemania, and not as a revisionist afterthought ... [it] is hardly a novelty record". Critic Kurt Wolff writes that while the album began as an attempt to capitalize on Beatlemania, the music "turns out to be surprisingly strong and well-arranged". He opines that the album – in particular, the covers of "Baby's in Black", "Ticket to Ride" and "Paperback Writer" – helps provide the "all-too-familiar numbers a hopped-up bluegrass spin that makes them sound fresher than they have in years".

Reviewing for AllMusic, Pemberton Roach awarded the album three out of five stars. Like Wolff, he similarly describes the album as "surprisingly ... excellent". He suggests that the band imbue the songs "with an authentic Kentucky mountain flavor", with the only kitsch on the album being the pronunciation of "Yellow Submarine" as "Yeller Submarine". He concludes that the LP remains both interesting as a novelty record and as "an excellent bluegrass album by any measure, regardless of the unusual source of its material". By contrast, John Paul of the online magazine Spectrum Culture describes the album as "[n]ot quite a novelty record yet far from essential". He characterizes the cover of "I've Just Seen a Face" as "like a lost bluegrass standard". He further opines that while the album is "[n]ot entirely proto-country rock", the entirely acoustic arrangements "still [manage] to convey the basic rock feel inherent in tracks like 'And Your Bird Can Sing' and 'Ticket to Ride.'"

== Legacy ==
In the months after its release, sales for Beatle Country quickly subsided. Composer and author Jack Curtis Dubowsky writes that, in light of the LP's poor sales, record labels recognized that recording Beatles songs in new styles was insufficient for commercial success and instead pivoted towards recording covers for general audiences in the more widely popular genre of easy listening. Beatle Country subsequently achieved cult status, becoming a valued collector's item; Craig Harris of AllMusic writes it sometimes sold for as much as $75, while Siggins recalled people paying hundreds of dollars for copies.

More than just the first rendition of the Beatles as country music, Beatle Country presaged Newgrass, which it antedated by several years. In that regard, it was a groundbreaking recording, demonstrating that material from outside the genre could be rendered as bluegrass.

– Boston Bluegrass Union, 2013

Beatle Country influenced the progressive bluegrass ("newgrass") movement of the 1970s, which saw bluegrass extending its harmonic and melodic range to incorporate the sounds of other musical genres. Siggins reflected that the album's influence extended to "[breaking] the ground to such an extent ... that [it] kind of loosened the strictures against any experimentation with bluegrass". Field stated that the album "[unleashed] a lot of people", including Sam Bush of the American progressive bluegrass band New Grass Revival, who listened to the album regularly. When the group Bluegrass Association covered "I've Just Seen a Face" for their 1974 album Strings Today ... And Yesterday, they based their arrangement on the Charles River Valley Boys' version.

Following the Charles River Valley Boys' 1970 disbandment, their LPs remained out-of-print until Beatle Country's 1995 CD re-release. (Note: Prestige re-released the band's 1962 album, Bluegrass and Old Timey Music, on CD in 2003, adding to its track listing the band's 1964 album, Blue Grass Get Together.) Field reflects that, despite Beatle Country being their biggest success, they remained a traditional bluegrass band: "The Beatles thing was just one part of what we did. It wasn't as if we became a Beatle band. That would have ended invitations to clubs and festivals at the time ... we wouldn’t have fit anywhere". Siggins commented that the group continued to arrange other Beatles songs after their work on the album, including complicated ones further from bluegrass than those included on the LP, such as "Yes It Is". When the Boston Bluegrass Union awarded the Charles River Valley Boys the Heritage Award in 2013, the band reunited and performed "I've Just Seen a Face" and "Help!" during the award ceremony at the city's annual Joe Val Bluegrass Festival.

== Track listing ==
All songs written by Lennon–McCartney, except "What Goes On", by Lennon–McCartney–Starkey. (Note: The liner notes of Beatle Country credit all songs to Lennon–McCartney.) Track lengths per the 1995 reissue liner notes. (Note: The original liner notes of Beatle Country write the duration of "Help!" is 2:38, while the 1995 reissue and AllMusic write it is 2:28.)

Side one

1. "I've Just Seen a Face" – 2:39
2. "Baby's in Black" – 2:53
3. "I Feel Fine" – 2:30
4. "Yellow Submarine" – 2:50
5. "Ticket to Ride" – 3:25
6. "And Your Bird Can Sing" – 2:45

Side two

1. "What Goes On" – 3:25
2. "Norwegian Wood" – 2:54
3. "Paperback Writer" – 2:49
4. "She's a Woman" – 2:34
5. "I Saw Her Standing There" – 2:10
6. "Help!" – 2:28

== Personnel ==
According to the liner notes of Beatle Country.

Charles River Valley Boys

- Jim Field – vocals, guitar
- Bob Siggins – vocals, banjo
- Joe Val – vocals, mandolin
- Everett A. Lily – bass

Additional musicians

- Buddy Spicher – fiddle
- Craig Wingfield – dobro
- Eric Thompson – lead guitar

Production

- Paul A. Rothchild – producer
- Peter K. Siegel – producer
- Glenn Snoddy – audio engineer
- Jac Holzman – production supervisor

Visuals

- Eros Keith – cover art
- William S. Harvey – cover design

== Charts ==
1967 weekly chart performance
Chart (1967)	Peak position
US Cash Box Top 100 Albums	127
