= The Baroque Beatles Book =

Studio album by Joshua Rifkin
- Released: November 1965
- Length: 35:31
- Label: Elektra/Nonesuch
- Producer: Mark Abramson

The Baroque Beatles Book is a record album by the American keyboardist and conductor Joshua Rifkin. Released by Elektra/Nonesuch in 1965, it takes musical themes of The Beatles and reworks them into Baroque style. The artwork on the cover, signed by illustrator Roger Hane, depicts classical composers reviewing the music to "I Want to Hold Your Hand", one of whom sports a Beatles t-shirt.

== Overview ==
Created at the height of Beatlemania in the 1960s, the works on the album share many characteristics with the music of Peter Schickele and his alter ego P. D. Q. Bach. These characteristics include parodies of stereotypical classical music conventions, anachronistic touches, and musical in-jokes that are apparent primarily to other musicians. Rifkin also shares with Schickele a penchant for unusual names and catalog numbers for the pieces.

Rifkin explained in the liner notes to the album that the idea for adapting Beatles music to baroque styles came from Elektra's president, Jac Holzman, and that he had suggested Schickele's name to the Elektra boss. With Schickele under contract to another label, Rifkin volunteered to undertake the task of creating the arrangements.

Despite the primarily humorous nature of the compositions, Rifkin also indicates in the liner notes (signed "1684" and written as a parody of a 17th-century composer attempting to curry favor and employment with a monarch) that one of his motivations was to demonstrate how the melodies of John Lennon and Paul McCartney can be favorably compared with those of the great Baroque masters.

The pieces on the album all call to mind similar works by Baroque composers. For example, the opening track "The Royale Beatleworks Musique" is, despite its name, an almost movement-for-movement parody not of Georg Friedrich Händel's Royal Fireworks Music, but of the Suite for Orchestra No. 4 in D by Johann Sebastian Bach, right down to the format and instrumentation. In addition to Bach, the notes make connections to Händel and to Georg Philipp Telemann.

Side one consists entirely of instrumental variations. The use of "MBE" to indicate the opus number refers to the four Beatles having been made Members of the Order of the British Empire (MBE). On the second side, Rifkin connects the number 58,000 to a reference to the Beatles' concert at Shea Stadium, where reportedly 58,000 were in attendance. The "Help!" aria begins with a recitative taken from Lennon's two books, In His Own Write and A Spaniard in the Works. After three vocal selections, the album concludes with a sonata for oboe, thoroughbass, and violin.

The orchestra on the album is credited as the "Baroque Ensemble of the Merseyside Kammermusickgesellschaft". The players were most likely an ad hoc group of session musicians.

== Release and reissues ==
The album, Elektra EKL-306 (mono) and EKS-7306 (stereo), was originally released in November 1965, on LP and reel-to-reel tape. The album sold well enough to warrant the release of a single, "You've Got to Hide Your Love Away"/"Ticket to Ride" (Elektra EK-45602). It became available on other tape formats, including four-track tape (1966) and cassette as the formats developed.

As an LP, the record remained in print through the 1970s, first on Elektra and then on Nonesuch Records. The album was released on CD August 26, 2006, and was released on iTunes on July 14, 2009.

== Reception ==
Professional ratings
Review scores
Source	Rating
AllMusic	4/5 stars

The Baroque Beatles Book was well received by the band's fans. An article in the November 27, 1965 issue of Billboard reported that radio station WMCA had received "hundreds" of favorable calls after playing selections from the LP. A week later, the magazine reviewed it as "good chamber music and good Beatles music". Elektra's advertisement for the album carried the taglines "Best Beatle Tunes in 18th Century Settings" and "Workin'!!"

The record debuted at number 126 on Billboard's Top LP's chart on December 11, 1965. It slowly gained favor, staying on the charts into the new year. After creeping into the Top 100 (peaking number 83 on February 19, 1966), album sales receded. Billboard labeled it successful for its niche, so that when the label released Beatle Country in December 1966, the introductory article recalled the "chart-busting" nature of this earlier Elektra release.

== Track listing ==
Side one

The Royale Beatleworks Musicke, MBE 1963

- Overture: I Want to Hold Your Hand and You're Gonna Lose that Girl – 6:00
- Réjouissance: I'll Cry Instead – 1:50
- La Paix: Things We Said Today – 2:02
- L'Amour s'en cachant: You've Got to Hide Your Love Away & Les Plaisirs: Ticket to Ride – 4:24

Epstein Variations, MBE 69A

- Hold Me Tight – 4:15

Side two

"Last Night I Said", Cantata for the Third Sunday after the Shea Stadium, MBE 58,000

- Chorus: "Last Night I Said" (Please Please Me) – 5:22
- Tenor (Helpentenor) Recitative: "In they came jorking" & Aria: "When I Was Younger" (Help!) – 5:31
- Chorale: "You know, if you break my heart" (I'll Be Back) – 1:40

Trio Sonata, Das Kaferlein, MBE 004 1/4

- Grave-Allegro-Grave: Eight Days a Week – 2:27
- Quodlibet: She Loves You/Thank You Girl/Hard Day's Night – 1:12

== Charts ==
Chart (1965)	Peak position
US Billboard Top LPs	83

== See also ==
- Beatles Arias, a 1967 album of Beatles songs sung operatically by American-born mezzo-soprano Cathy Berberian
