= Elizabeth Hamilton =

Elizabeth Hamilton may refer to:

- Elizabeth Hamilton, Countess of Orkney (1657–1733), mistress to English King William III
- Elizabeth Hamilton, 1st Baroness Hamilton of Hameldon (1733–1790)
- Elizabeth Hamilton, Duchess of Hamilton (1757–1837)
- Elizabeth Schuyler Hamilton (1757–1854), American philanthropist and co-founder of Graham Windham, wife of American politician Alexander Hamilton
- Elizabeth Hamilton (writer) (1756 or 1758–1816), Scottish writer
- Elizabeth Hamilton (fencer) (1919–2011), Canadian Olympic fencer
- Elizabeth Douglas-Hamilton, Duchess of Hamilton (1916–2008)
- Betty Hamilton (1904–1994), British Trotskyist
- Elizabeth, Countess de Gramont (Elizabeth Hamilton, 1640–1708), British courtier and French lady in waiting
- Elisabeth Hamilton Friermood (1903–1992), American writer
- Elizabeth Smith-Stanley, Countess of Derby (née Hamilton, 1753–1797)

== See also ==
- Beth Hamilton (born October 25, 1980) is a Canadian curler
- Eliza Mary Hamilton (1807–1851), Irish poet
