= Vaeth =

Vaeth is a surname. Notable people with the surname include:

- Joseph Gordon Vaeth (1921–2012), US Navy officer and engineer
- Patricia Vaeth (1926–2006), American figure skater
