= Charles River Valley Boys =

American bluegrass band

The Charles River Valley Boys
- Origin: Cambridge, Massachusetts, United States
- Genre: Bluegrass
- Years active: 1959-1968
- Labels: Folklore, Mount Auburn, Prestige, Elektra
- Past members: Bob Siggins; Eric Sackheim; Ethan Signer; John Cooke; Fritz Richmond; Joe Val; Jim Field; Everett Allen Lilly

The Charles River Valley Boys were an American bluegrass group who toured and recorded in the 1960s and were best known for their 1966 album, Beatle Country, presenting bluegrass versions of songs by the Beatles.

== History ==
The group was formed by students in Cambridge, Massachusetts in 1959. They took their name as a jokey reference to the Laurel River Valley Boys, a traditional bluegrass group from North Carolina who recorded several albums in that style in the 1950s, and to the Charles River, which flows through Cambridge and Boston, Massachusetts.

Although the group's membership changed frequently, the core performers of the Charles River Valley Boys in the early years were Eric Sackheim (guitar, mandolin), Bob Siggins (banjo, vocals), and Clay Jackson (guitar, vocals), all students at Harvard, and Ethan Signer (guitar, mandolin, autoharp, vocals), a graduate student at the Massachusetts Institute of Technology. All were fans of bluegrass and old-timey music, and they began performing together, often with others, at Harvard, appearing regularly on the Harvard student radio station WHRB and becoming regular performers at Tulla's Coffeehouse in Harvard Square. In 1961 they recorded an album, Bringin' In The Georgia Mail, partly in Cambridge and partly in London, England. It was released in the UK by Doug Dobell on his Folklore label.

In 1962, Paul Rothchild, a friend of the band who had worked as a record distributor in the Boston area, produced their second album on his own label, Mount Auburn Records. He then began working for Prestige Records, which reissued the album as Bluegrass And Old Timey Music (1962), and produced a further album on the label, Blue Grass Get Together (with Tex Logan, 1964). By that time, the group comprised Siggins, Signer, John Cooke (guitar, vocals), and Fritz Richmond (washtub bass, vocals). Cooke, the son of English-born journalist Alistair Cooke, had joined after Eric Sackheim decided to return to his studies in Europe. Between 1963 and 1965, the group performed and toured on a full-time basis.

By 1966, Signer, Cooke and Richmond had left, and the group comprised Bob Siggins, Joe Val (mandolin, vocals), Jim Field (guitar, vocals) and Everett Allen Lilly (bass). Val had previously played in groups with Bill Keith; Field had been a member of the New York Ramblers with David Grisman; and Lilly was the son of Everett Lilly from the Lilly Brothers, a highly respected traditional bluegrass act. After Paul Rothchild began working as a staff producer for Elektra Records, the group sent him a demo tape which included bluegrass versions of two Beatles' songs, "I've Just Seen a Face" and "What Goes On". Rothchild was impressed, and suggested the band record an entire album of Beatles' songs. Label boss Jac Holzman flew to London to get clearance for the idea from the Beatles themselves, and the album was recorded in Nashville with additional support from musicians Buddy Spicher (fiddle), Craig Wingfield (dobro), and Eric Thompson (lead guitar).

Siggins later said:

"A lot of the folkies were into the Beatles big time, on the sly if nothing else, including us. We just thought a lot of [their songs] would adapt themselves to a country sound...As we got into learning the songs, we discovered that the singing they did lent itself well to bluegrass harmonies, which we liked to kind of layer on top of the lead vocal. And they did some kind of similar things....We just had a lot of fun with it. It was a lot of work, but it was a lot of fun work. Working out the harmonies, especially. We weren't like super-hot, hard-driving instrumentalists, really, although we tried. And that's, in a sense, why we hired some of the guys we hired for the record. 'Cause we were more into vocalists, vocalizing. That was the fun part for us, I think... The only flak we got was from Joe Val initially. He was kind of edgy about it. I think he was worried about what some of his friends might say, some of his hardcore bluegrass fans. Our approach was to do it as hardcore bluegrass as we could. And I think that kind of settled his mind on it a bit... He had fun with it too. Other than that, we got only approval, basically, as near as I could tell. Especially on the west coast, when we came out to play some of it on tour."

The album, Beatle Country, was released by Elektra Records in 1966. It was marketed with a cover of cowboys in London, and promotional materials pushing the album toward a mainstream country market. Although it achieved some success, Rothchild then began working in California with rock bands, most notably The Doors, and the album was not followed up. The Charles River Valley Boys split up in 1968.

Beatle Country became a sought-after collector's item before it was reissued on CD by Rounder Records in 1995.

Bob Siggins died on September 22, 2023, at the age of 85.

== Discography ==
Year	Title	Label	Number	Notes
1962	Bringin' In the Georgia Mail	Folklore (UK)	F-LEUT/3	
1962	Bluegrass and Old Timey Music	Mount Auburn Records/Club 47	MTA One	Limited edition of 1000. Reissued as Prestige International INT-13074 (1962) and Prestige Folklore FL-14017 (1964?) and on PRCD-24280-2 (2003)
1964	Blue Grass Get Together	Prestige Folklore	FL 14024	with Tex Logan, reissued on PRCD-24280-2 (2003)
1966	Beatle Country	Elektra	EKL 4006	also stereo LP EKS 74006 (1966), reissued as Rounder CD SS 41 (1995)
