= Fritz Richmond =

American musician and recording engineer

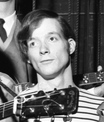
- Richmond, c. early 1960s

Background information
- Born: John B. Richmond; July 10, 1939; Newton, Massachusetts, United States
- Died: November 20, 2005 (aged 66) Portland, Oregon, United States
- Occupations: Musician, recording engineer
- Instruments: Washtub bass, jug

John B. "Fritz" Richmond (July 10, 1939 – November 20, 2005) was an American musician and recording engineer. Richmond was a washtub bassist and was also a professional jug player.

Richmond, born in Newton, Massachusetts, on July 10, 1939, was a founding member of The Hoppers, a school-chum jug band that played the coffeehouse circuit in the Boston area. Jug band music featured homemade or folk-style instruments such as the washboard (used for percussion), a large earthenware jug used as a wind instrument, and a single-string washtub bass. Fritz's first instrument was made using his buddy Tom Stephan's mothers wash tub, Tom's hockey stick and a length of Mrs. Stephan's clothes line. He also used a jug found in the Stephan's basement. This type of music, in England, became known as skiffle music and was played by groups who could not afford electric instruments, such as the Quarrymen, a Liverpool skiffle group that evolved into the Beatles.

After a stint in the Army (1958–61) and then a gig with the Charles River Valley Boys, Richmond was a founding member and a longtime jug and washtub player in the extremely influential Jim Kweskin Jug Band in the 1960s.

Following the breakup of the Kweskin band, Richmond moved to the West coast and became an in-demand accompanist as American rock began to embrace folk and country roots. During his life, Richmond was routinely given accolades such as "[t]he world's best living jug player", "[t]he undisputed king and reigning world champion of the jug and washtub bass", and "the world’s greatest living jug and washtub bass player". Richmond’s washtub and jug stylings provided old-time music flavor on recordings for a large network of artists that included Jackson Browne ("Walking Slow"), Loudon Wainwright III, Maria Muldaur, Geoff Muldaur, Tom Rush, Ry Cooder, Norman Greenbaum, and The Grateful Dead.

Richmond also worked as a recording engineer for many artists, principally on Elektra Records for artists such as The Doors, and his credits can be found on albums by, among others, Warren Zevon, Bonnie Raitt, and Jackson Browne.

Richmond also contributed a key counterculture fashion accessory. Roger McGuinn and John Sebastian credit Richmond with the introduction of "granny glasses" in the early 1960s. A well-known photo by John Byrne Cooke shows Richmond wearing his homemade pair in 1963, long before John Lennon popularized the "British welfare glasses". Spectacles like Richmond’s – consisting initially of colored non-prescription glass set into old wire-frames, thus shielding the often-stoned performer's eyes from public view – then became common on the San Francisco rock scene where the Jim Kweskin Jug Band was paired in concert with bands such as The Doors and Big Brother and the Holding Company. Janis Joplin and Jerry Garcia, who also socialized with Richmond, were among those who adopted the colored-lens look.

Richmond also came up with the name for the band The Lovin’ Spoonful.

Richmond continued to perform through 2004. For approximately the last decade of his life he was a core member of John Sebastian’s J-Band, and a sometime member of The Fountain of Youth.

Music writer Jim Mitchell described Richmond as a "notorious luminary in the field of old-time American music. Nobody with even the slightest knowledge of jug band music and traditional string-band repertoire can overlook his contributions … which are indeed of historical significance." One of Richmond’s washtub basses is in the permanent collection of the Smithsonian Institution.

Richmond died in Portland, Oregon of lung cancer on November 20, 2005, mourned and celebrated by the folk community.
