= Beatles Arias =

Studio album by Cathy Berberian
- Released: 1967
- Recorded: December 1966, Studio Arsonor, Paris
- Genre: Baroque pop, operatic pop
- Label: Polydor (UK), Philips (Ger.), Fontana (US)

Cathy Berberian chronology
Rounds with voice (1965)	Beatles Arias (1967)	Roman Haubenstock-Ramati. Credential or think, think lucky (1967)

Beatles Arias is a 1967 LP recorded by American-born mezzo-soprano Cathy Berberian. The original album consists of twelve of Berberian's distinctive operatic-style cover versions of songs by The Beatles, scored for a small chamber ensemble, consisting of a string quartet or wind quintet with harpsichord or organ. The chamber arrangements were by Paul Boyer, and featured Guy Boyer on harpsichord and organ, with an unnamed French string quartet and a wind quintet. Berberian was inspired to create this album while singing along to her 13-year-old daughter's Beatles records.

The album was recorded in December 1966 at Studio Arsonor in Paris. It was originally released on the Polydor label in the UK in 1967. It was issued in Germany later that year on the Philips Records label under the title Beatles Arias For Special Fans (featuring a monochrome photo of Berberian). The original cover illustration is by Gerald Scarfe (working under the pseudonym "Sir Ralph Godstrouser-Legge R. A.").

The album was also issued in the US on the Fontana Records label under the title Revolution, with a photo/illustration collage reminiscent of The Beatles' 1966 LP Revolver.

The album was reissued on CD on the Telescopic label in 2004, with new cover art and several bonus tracks - a radio interview with Berberian recorded by Radio France in February 1975, and three newer live versions of Beatles tracks, one recorded at the Festival de Divonne-les-Bains in 1980, and two at the Festival d'Avignon in 1982. These live recordings feature Bruno Canino on piano and harpsichord, with arrangements by noted Dutch composer Louis Andriessen.

== Reception ==
A review in the June 2, 1967 issue of Time said of this album: "There may be comic incongruity in her highfalutin version of 'Yellow Submarine', and Paul McCartney, surprisingly enough, sings 'Eleanor Rigby' a great deal more movingly than Cathy does. Yet in such waifish songs as 'Michelle', 'Here There and Everywhere' and 'Yesterday', her tasteful, straightforward singing warmly underlines John Lennon's lyrics and McCartney's inventive melodies."

== Track listing ==
All songs were credited to Lennon–McCartney.

=== Original 1967 version ===
Side 1:

1. "Ticket to Ride"
2. "I Want to Hold Your Hand"
3. "Michelle"
4. "Eleanor Rigby"
5. "Yellow Submarine"
6. "Here, There and Everywhere"

Side 2:

1. "Help!"
2. "You've Got to Hide Your Love Away"
3. "Yesterday"
4. "Can't Buy Me Love"
5. "Girl"
6. "A Hard Day's Night"

=== 2004 Telescopic CD release ===
1. "Ticket To Ride" – 2:36
2. "I Want To Hold Your Hand" – 1:54
3. "Michelle" – 2:28
4. "Eleanor Rigby" – 2:23
5. "Yellow Submarine" – 2:03
6. "Here, There and Everywhere" – 2:11
7. "Help!" – 1:33
8. "You've Got to Hide Your Love Away" – 2:11
9. "Yesterday" – 2:25
10. "Can't Buy Me Love" – 1:38
11. "Girl" – 2:26
12. "A Hard Day's Night" – 1:44
13. "Pourquoi Je Chante Les Beatles?" (Interviewer – Bertrand Jérôme) – 1:43
14. "Introduction" – 2:20
15. "Ticket To Ride" – 2:34 (piano – Bruno Canino)
16. "Yesterday" – 2:02 (piano – Bruno Canino)
17. "Ticket To Ride" – 2:33 (harpsichord – Bruno Canino)
- Tracks 13: Cathy Berberian interviewed on Radio France, February 1975
- Tracks 14 to 15: recorded at the Festival d'Avignon, 1982
- Tracks 16 to 17: recorded at the Festival de Divonne-les-Bains, 1980

== See also ==
- The Baroque Beatles Book, a 1965 album by Joshua Rifkin in which Beatles songs are reworked in a baroque style
