= Maestro FZ-1 Fuzz-Tone =

Fuzz pedal

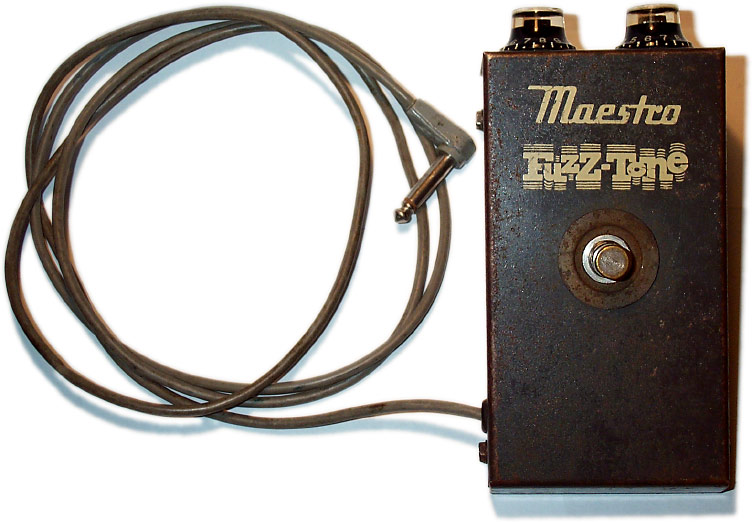
Gibson Maestro FZ-1 Fuzz-tone.

The Maestro FZ-1 Fuzz-Tone was the first widely marketed fuzz distortion guitar and bass effect. Introduced in 1962, it achieved widespread popularity in 1965 after the Rolling Stones guitarist Keith Richards prominent use of the FZ-1 on the group's hit, "Satisfaction". Later in 1965 the design was slightly modified, designated as the model FZ1-1a. Although quite rare, a few examples of a model FZ-2 have surfaced that were produced by the Gibson distributor in Canada during the late 1960s. In the wake of the success of the Rolling Stones' "Satisfaction," numerous recordings—mostly from 1960s garage rock and psychedelic acts—featured Maestro Fuzz-Tones on guitars. More significant design changes made after 1967 resulted in different renditions of the Fuzz-Tone released over the years. In the 1990s, Gibson re-issued the FZ-1a, but it was later discontinued.

== History ==
=== Early use of fuzz effects ===
In the late 1950s, guitarist Link Wray began intentionally overdriving his vacuum tube amplifiers to create a noisy and "dirty" sound for his solos after an accidental discovery. Wray also poked holes in his speaker cones with pencils to further distort the tone, used electro-mechanical echo chambers (then usually employed by singers), the recent powerful and "fat" Gibson humbucking pickups, and controlled "feedback" (Larsen effect). The resultant sound can be heard on his influential 1958 instrumental, "Rumble" and Rawhide. In 1961, while recording the Marty Robbins song "Don't Worry", a fuzzy tone accidentally caused by a faulty preamplifier in Bradley Studio B's mixing console distorted session musician Grady Martin's guitar part. Later that year Martin recorded an instrumental tune under his own name using the same faulty preamp. The song, released on the Decca label, was called "The Fuzz", and Martin is generally credited as the discoverer of the "fuzz effect." Shortly thereafter, the American instrumental rock band The Ventures asked their friend, session musician and electronics enthusiast Orville "Red" Rhodes for help recreating the Grady Martin "fuzz" sound. Rhodes offered The Ventures a fuzzbox he had made, which they used to record "2000 Pound Bee" in 1962.

=== Introduction of the Maestro FZ-1 and FZ1a ===
As "Don't Worry” topped the country charts and crossed over to the pop charts, the unique sound of the faulty mixing console channel rapidly became sought after in Nashville studios, but the transformer had failed completely, so recording engineer Glenn Snoddy partnered with fellow WSM radio engineer Revis V. Hobbs to design and build a stand-alone device that would intentionally create the fuzzy effect. The two engineers sold their circuit to Gibson, who introduced it as the Maestro FZ-1 Fuzz-Tone in 1962, the first commercially available fuzzbox to gain widespread acceptance, and U.S. patent 3,213,181 was issued to Snoddy and Hobbs on October 19, 1965.

The Maestro FZ-1 contained a three germanium transistor circuit with RCA 2N270 devices, powered by two 1.5-volt batteries, and a lead cable to connect it to an instrument (bass as it was originally intended, or guitar). Germanium devices are temperature sensitive, and the effect responds to the incoming signal's amplitude (volume) consistently. Upon release, Gibson/Maestro made a demonstration disc available, featuring sound samples of the different settings of the pedal and guitar combination, emphasising the "brass-like" quality of certain tones. The circuit made its way into the body of Gibson's EB-0F "fuzz basses" (circa 1964).

Sales of the Maestro FZ-1 jumped after the Maestro featured prominently on the intro and main riff of the Rolling Stones' 1965 hit "(I Can't Get No) Satisfaction. Stones guitarist Keith Richards had laid an FZ-1 scratch track to guide an intended but never used brass section, but against Richards’ wishes, the scratch track remained. The popularity of Satisfaction caused every Maestro FZ-1 Fuzz-Tone to sell out as it became a favorite of many garage rock and psychedelic bands of the time. Other early fuzzboxes include the Mosrite FuzzRITE, and the Sola Sound Tone Bender MkI. A few years later others followed, such as the Arbiter Group Fuzz Face used by Jimi Hendrix, the Electro-Harmonix Big Muff Pi used by Carlos Santana.

In late 1965, the FZ-1 circuit was revised, using 2N2614 or 2N2613 transistors, with pertinent biasing network, powered by a single, 1.5-volt battery. This updated model was re-designated as the FZ-1a, keeping the same wedge shaped enclosure as the original FZ-1. In 1968, the FZ-1 was updated again with a different look and sound, with a circuit designed by Robert Moog using a 9-volt power supply and alternatively two or four silicon transistors, and designated the Maestro FZ-1B. The FZ-1B went through three circuit revisions. In the late 1960s, the FZ-2 with the original wedge shaped enclosure and an updated circuit was produced by Turner Musical Instruments in Canada with very limited distribution. In the 1970s Maestro introduced the FZ-1S Super-Fuzz, which had a distinctly different look and sound than previous Fuzz-Tone models.

=== Re-issue and reproductions ===
Gibson briefly re-issued the Maestro FZ-1A Fuzz-Tone in the 1990s, but later discontinued the model. It has not been manufactured since. Other brands have offered models attempting to replicate the sound of the FZ-1 and FZ-1A.

In 2022, Gibson announced a new lineup of Maestro-branded effects pedals, including the Fuzz-Tone FZ-M. This version features a new housing and two different fuzz circuits, one of which is designed to sound like the original FZ-1.

== See also ==
- List of distortion pedals
