= Joe Val =

American bluegrass musician (1926–1985)

- Born: Joseph Valiante; June 26, 1926; Everett, Massachusetts, United States
- Died: June 11, 1985 (aged 58) Boston, Massachusetts, United States
- Genres: Bluegrass
- Occupation: Instrumentalist
- Instruments: Mandolin, guitar, banjo

Joseph 'Val' Valiante (June 26, 1926 - June 11, 1985) was a bluegrass musician and singer from New England, known for his mandolin playing and his high tenor voice. He was posthumously inducted into the International Bluegrass Music Hall of Fame in 2018.

== Life and career ==
Joe Val was born Joseph Valiante in Everett, Massachusetts. Although raised in the northeast, he took an early interest in bluegrass music, prompted chiefly by hearing Bill Monroe on radio and records. He also listened to local bands, and especially the work of fiddler Tex Logan. It was Logan who coined the name 'Val' (short for Valiante). Tex could not pronounce the Italian last name, thus introducing Joe onstage as Joe 'Val'.

Valiante worked a full-time day job as a typewriter repairman. He often had to ask for time off from work to tour with his band. In the early 60s, Valiante performed in Boston's folk and bluegrass scene with the Lilly Brothers, and later with Joan Baez, The Charles River Valley Boys, Don Stover and Bill Keith, and Jim Rooney. Valiante began performing with a guitar, but also played banjo and the mandolin.

In 1970, Valiante formed the The New England Bluegrass Boys, bringing in Herb Applin (guitar/vocals), Bob French (banjo), and Bob Tidwell (bass). The band recorded their first album, entitled One Morning In May, in 1972. One Morning In May was the first bluegrass release for Rounder Records. Joe Val & The New England Bluegrass Boys recorded exclusively with Rounder Records from 1973-1984.

In 1984, Valiante was diagnosed with lymphoma. The band kept up a touring schedule for the rest of the year, despite a series of Valiante's hospitalizations. In late December the band flew to the Jekyll Island Bluegrass Festival in Georgia. Though Valiante was ill, he insisted on making the trip and he wowed the crowd with his rendition of House of Gold. Returning to Boston, Valiante was again hospitalized and did not perform again.

Two major fundraising benefits were held to cover medical costs and household bills while Valiante was ill and unable to work. The first benefit concert was organized in November 1984 in West Hartford, Connecticut, at which The Johnson Mountain Boys, Del & Jerry McCoury, Bob & Dan Paisley and Traver Hollow performed.

A second benefit, the Joe Val Benefit and Appreciation Day, on June 9, 1985, was organized by the Boston Bluegrass Union, the North River Bluegrass Association, and several volunteers. Among the performers were the duo of Tony Rice & Jimmy Gaudreau, John Lincoln Wright, Bill Keith, Traver Hollow, White Mountain Bluegrass, Valiante's brother Paul Valiante and more.

== Posthumous recognition ==
The International Bluegrass Music Association posthumously presented Joe Val with an 'IBMA Award Of Merit' for his dedication and lifetime contributions to bluegrass music during their 1995 IBMA World of Bluegrass annual bluegrass trade show & convention.

== Discography ==
=== Albums as featured artist ===
- "Livin' on the Mountain" with Bill Keith and Jim Rooney (Prestige Folklore Records, 1963)
- Bluegrass Get-Together with the Charles River Valley Boys (Prestige Folklore Records, 1964)
- Charles River Valley Boys "Beatle Country" (Elektra Records, 1966)

=== Joe Val & The New England Bluegrass Boys albums ===
- One Morning in May Rounder Records (1972)
- Joe Val & the New England Bluegrass Boys Rounder Records (1974)
- Not a Word from Home Rounder Records (1977)
- Bound to Ride Rounder Records 1979)
- Live in Holland Strictly Country Records (Netherlands 1981)
- Sparkling Brown Eyes Rounder Records (1983)
- Cold Wind Rounder Records (1983)

=== Compilation albums ===
- 2nd Pioneer Valley Jamboree [Various, recorded live at Hangar One in Amherst, MA] (Pioneer #PNR 102, 1981)
- Prairie Home Companion Tourists: Music & Laughter From The Road, 1981–82 (High Bridge Audio, 2008)
- Diamond Joe (Rounder Records 1995)
