= Let Us in Americana: The Music of Paul McCartney =

Compilation album by Various artists
- Released: June 23, 2013
- Genre: Americana
- Label: Reviver Records
- Producer: Phil Madeira, Executive: Chris Ford, David Ross, Dennis D’Amico

Let Us in Americana: The Music of Paul McCartney is a tribute album to musician Paul McCartney. Phil Madeira produced the album, released by Reviver Records in 2013. All the proceeds for the album were donated to the Women and Cancer Fund, a charity established in memory of Linda McCartney.

== Track listing ==
No.	Title	Performer(s)	Length
1.	"Come and Get It"	The Wood Brothers	3:27
2.	"Yellow Submarine"	Buddy Miller	2:46
3.	"Band on the Run"	Will Hoge	4:35
4.	"I'm Looking Through You"	Jim Lauderdale	2:31
5.	"My Love"	Holly Williams	4:02
6.	"Let Me Roll It"	Teddy Thompson	4:26
7.	"The Fool on the Hill"	Bruce Cockburn	4:06
8.	"Get Back"	Ollabelle	3:12
9.	"Let 'Em In"	Lee Ann Womack	3:59
10.	"I Will"	Steve Earle, Allison Moorer	1:58
11.	"Every Night"	Rodney Crowell	3:33
12.	"Yesterday"	Matraca Berg	2:49
13.	"Give Ireland Back to the Irish"	Ketch Secor	3:56
14.	"I've Just Seen a Face"	Sam Bush	2:40
15.	"Uncle Albert/Admiral Halsey"	Ed Snodderly	5:43
16.	"Let It Be"	Amy Helm, Fiona McBain, Allison Moorer, The McCrary Sisters	3:57
