= Roulade (music) =

Type of music ornamentation

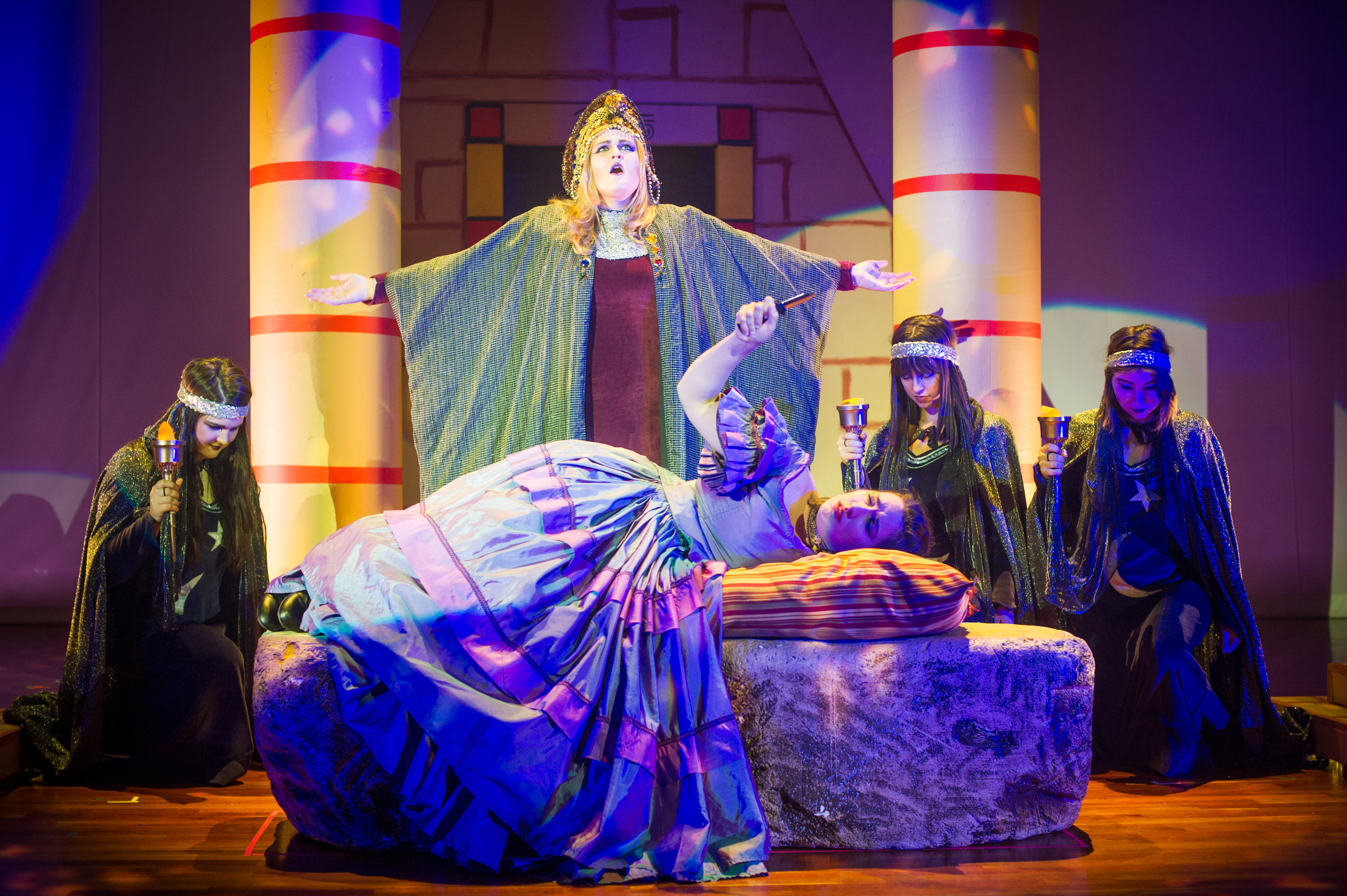
Queen of the Night aria prominently showcases a roulade in Mozart's opera The Magic Flute (2015 production)

A roulade (from Old French rouler, "to roll") is a type of music ornamentation. The term has been used with some variation in meaning. While the term has had some usage in instrumental music, it is most frequently used in the context of vocal music to refer to a florid embellishment of several musical notes sung on a single syllable. The word has sometimes been used interchangeably with the term coloratura to refer to any difficult vocal run requiring great vocal dexterity, or as a synonym for or a specific type of virtuosic melisma. The term roulade has also been used more specifically to refer to the ornamental practice of splitting up the melodic line of a piece of music into many smaller notes.

The term roulade has sometimes been defined as a vocal ornamental passage specifically limited to opera arias of the Classical and Romantic music periods. However, this limited definition is contradicted in the historical record, and other writers have used the term in contexts to other forms of music, such as oratorio, gospel music, and rock and roll.

== History and use of the term ==
The term roulade has been used with variation in meaning. It has sometimes been defined as a vocal ornamental passage specifically limited to opera arias of the Classical and Romantic music periods; including in musicologist Theodore Cyrus Karp's Dictionary of Music (1983). However, this limited definition does not match the historical use of the term.

The first published use of the word roulade in a music context was in Elizabeth Burwell's Burwell Lute Tutor (c1660–72); an instructional guide for the lute. In that work a 'single roulade' referred to a short appoggiatura, first ascending and then descending, applied on the beat to conjunct notes or notes a 3rd scale degree apart; and a 'double roulade' referred to a slide or double backfall descending the interval of a 3rd into the main note. Some writers later used the term roulade in reference to florid ornamental passages for woodwinds within oratorios.

In vocal music a roulade is an elaborate embellishment of several notes sung to one syllable. The writer James Grassineau in his 1740 publication A Musical Dictionary defined the roulade as a "trilling or quavering", and "the act of trilling or shaking, or running a division with a voice". The 19th century Spanish music theorist José Joaquín de Virués y Spínola wrote that, "The Roulade is a smooth but rapid course of notes interspersed into the course of an air without breaking the time or disturbing the subject matter of the composition."

In opera, the term roulade has become closely associated with coloratura vocal ornamentation; and the terms have been used synonymously with one another to refer to any difficult run requiring great vocal dexterity. The term roulade has also been used more specifically to refer to the ornamental practice of splitting up the melodic line of a piece of music into many smaller notes. It has also been defined as a specific type of melisma that is virtuosic in character. Composer Jean-Jacques Rousseau expressed his opinion that the roulade was useful for its dramatic impact within the aria parlante; a declamatory aria known for emotive passion. Rousseau wrote:

"As violent passion has a tendency to choke the voice, so in the expression of it by musical sounds, a roulade, which is a succession of notes rapidly uttered on one vowel, has often more powerful effect than distinct articulation."

While mainly used in the context of opera arias, the term roulade has also been applied by some writers to melismas in choral music. Some sources have defined a melisma as a type of roulade or as synonymous with a roulade. In D. E. Hervey's 1894 essay, Handel in the Nineteenth Century, he wrote of the melismas extent in Handel's Messiah:

"From other duets in the same volumes were constructed the four choruses "And He Shall Purify", "For Unto Us A Child Is Born", "All We Like Sheep", and "His Yoke is Easy". The light hearted roulades that so offend the religious and even serious-minded in these choruses were perhaps admissible in love-duets, but we cannot admit that they are proper in oratorio, and especially in such a solemn oratorio."

Aside from classical music, the term roulade has been applied to other genres including gospel music and rock and roll. Operatic roulades have been utilized by some gospel singers in a blending of styles. Jerry Garcia's vocals in the rock band Grateful Dead's "Black Peter" has been described as containing roulades. A line in the Steely Dan track, "Your Gold Teeth", remarks, "Even Cathy Berberian knows there's one roulade she can't sing."
