= I've Just Seen a Face =

1965 song by the Beatles

- Cover of the Northern Songs sheet music

Song by the Beatles

from the album Help!
- Released: 6 August 1965
- Recorded: 14 June 1965
- Studio: EMI, London
- Genre: Folk rock, country and western, pop rock
- Length: 2:02
- Label: Parlophone
- Songwriter: Lennon–McCartney
- Producer: George Martin

Licensed audio
- "I've Just Seen A Face" on YouTube

"I've Just Seen a Face" is a song by the English rock band the Beatles. It was released in August 1965 on their album Help!, except in North America, where it appeared as the opening track on the December 1965 release Rubber Soul. Written and sung by Paul McCartney, the song is credited to the Lennon–McCartney partnership. The song is a cheerful love ballad, its lyrics discussing a love at first sight while conveying an adrenaline rush the singer experiences that makes him both enthusiastic and inarticulate.

The song began as an uptempo country and western-style piano piece, originally titled "Auntie Gin's Theme". McCartney then added lyrics that may have been inspired by his relationship with actress Jane Asher. The Beatles completed the track on 14 June 1965 at EMI Studios in London on the same day they recorded "I'm Down" and "Yesterday". The recording fuses country and western with several other musical genres, including folk rock, folk, pop rock and bluegrass. With no bass guitar, it features three acoustic guitars, a brushed snare and maracas.

Several reviewers have described "I've Just Seen a Face" in favourable terms, highlighting its rhyming lyricism and McCartney's vocal delivery, and described it as an overlooked song. Its replacement of "Drive My Car" on the North American version of Rubber Soul advanced the album's identity as a folk rock work, although some commentators view this change as masking the band's late-1965 creative developments. It was among the first Beatles songs McCartney played live with his group Wings, and versions from their 1975–76 world tour appear on the 1976 live album Wings over America and in the 1980 concert film Rockshow. The song has been covered by several bluegrass bands, including the Charles River Valley Boys, the Dillards and the New Grass Revival with Leon Russell. George Martin, Holly Cole and Brandi Carlile are among the other artists who have covered it.

== Background and inspiration ==
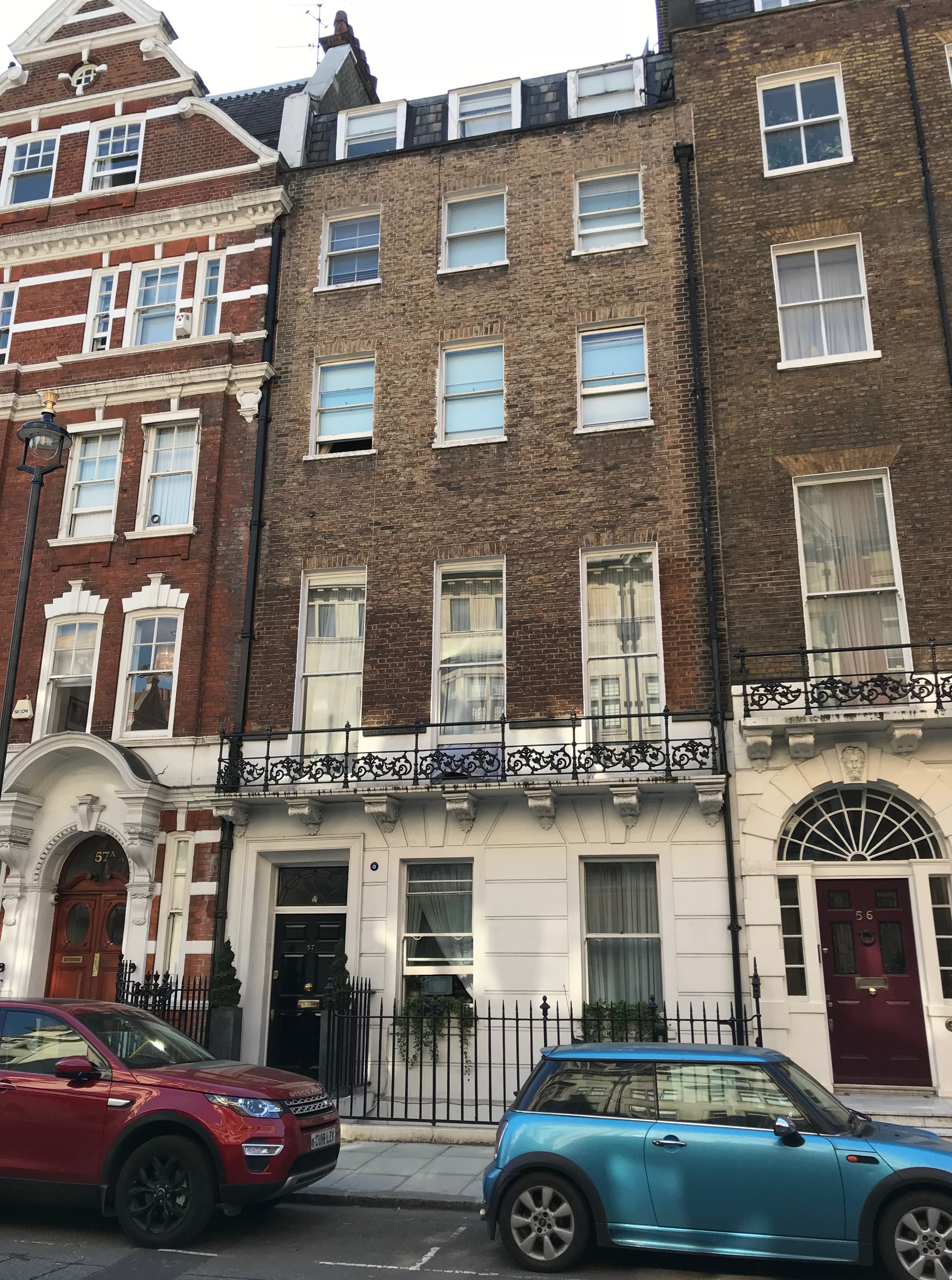
Paul McCartney wrote the song in the basement music room of 57 Wimpole Street, central London (pictured in 2018), the family home of his girlfriend, Jane Asher.

Although the song is credited to the Lennon–McCartney songwriting partnership, John Lennon and Paul McCartney each identified "I've Just Seen a Face" as having been written entirely by McCartney. McCartney recalled writing it in the basement music room at 57 Wimpole Street in central London. The house was the family home of his girlfriend, actress Jane Asher, where McCartney lodged from November 1963. Working on a piano, he composed the melody first, beginning it as an uptempo country and western-inflected piece. After he played it on the piano at a family gathering, his aunt Gin enjoyed the tune, prompting him to give it the working title "Auntie Gin's Theme". (Note: Virginia "Gin" Harris was the younger sister of McCartney's father, Jim McCartney. McCartney later referenced her in the song "Let 'Em In", released on the 1976 album Wings at the Speed of Sound.) He added fast-paced lyrics which may have been inspired by his relationship with Asher, turning the song into a cheerful love ballad.

McCartney completed "I've Just Seen a Face" too late for inclusion in the Beatles' second feature film, Help!, most of the songs for which were recorded in February 1965. He presented it to the band in mid-June, soon after returning from holidaying in Portugal with Asher. During the holiday, he also wrote the lyrics to his ballad "Yesterday". Author Ian MacDonald comments that, since writing "Can't Buy Me Love" in early 1964, McCartney had fallen behind Lennon in output, Lennon being the primary writer of the Beatles' next four singles. (Note: The four A-sides were "A Hard Day's Night", "I Feel Fine", "Ticket to Ride" and "Help!" The pair co-wrote "Eight Days a Week", released as a single in the United States in February 1965.) Most of the sessions for the band's Help! album had also focused on Lennon compositions. In MacDonald's view, given McCartney's absorption in his relationship with Asher and the contrasting depth and originality of Lennon's writing since 1964, McCartney was motivated by the need to apply a renewed focus in his writing on Help!, to regain his equal status in the songwriting partnership.

== Composition ==
=== Music ===
"I've Just Seen a Face" is in the key of A major and is in 2/2 (cut time). (Note: Everett writes the song is in cut time. Pollack writes that the song can be counted in either 2/2 or 4/4 (common time), but that if counted in the former, the listener can "more easily grasp the extent to which the underlying tempo is constant".) The song begins with a ten measure intro. Split into three phrases, the intro uses triplets that are slower than the rest of the song to create a sense of acceleration, reinforced by a shortened third phrase which quickens the first verse's arrival. McCartney used the effect of slow triplets again later that year in "We Can Work It Out". The song's first chord is F-sharp minor, slightly away from the home key, and is similar to "Help!" in leaving its harmonic grounding ambiguous until the end of the intro. Following the intro, the song speeds up in tempo to what music scholar Terence J. O'Grady calls "an undanceable speed".

The song uses four chords total; the twelve-measure verses use the common pop chord progression I–vi–IV–V, while the eight-measure refrains use the blues progression V–IV–I. The latter progression simulates descent (suggested by the lyrics: "[V] falling, yes I am [IV] falling, and she keeps [I] calling ..."), and the inclusion of a melodic minor third on the first syllable of "calling" gives the refrain section a blues sound. Structurally, the song includes three different verses, an instrumental break and a reprise of the first verse. After the second verse, each section is separated from the other by a chorus. Like other Beatles songs, a triple repeat of the chorus signals the end of the song, though Pollack writes "[t]he repeat here of an entire eight bar chorus is rather unprecedented." The outro finishes by repeating a phrase from the end of the intro to provide a feeling of symmetry.

==== Genre ====
By this point [the Beatles] had been freely borrowing and blending various stylistic elements of pop, rock, folk, blues, and still other styles for quite a while. Still, this otherwise sweetly simple "folk rock" song really pushes the envelope in terms of the sheer number of diverse styles juggled simultaneously as well as the effortlessly seamless manner in which they are fused.

— Musicologist Alan W. Pollack on "I've Just Seen a Face", 1993

The composition fuses several different styles and is difficult to categorise. Musicologist Alan W. Pollack describes the song on the whole as folk rock, as does MacDonald, though Pollack characterises parts of the song differently, describing the first two verses as "pure pop-rock", the changes between verse and refrain in the second half as "folksy" and the triplet refrain in the outro as like an "R&B rave-up". Musicologist Walter Everett describes it as both folk and a "bluegrass-tinged ballad", suggesting it anticipates the "simple folk style" of McCartney's 1968 composition "Mother Nature's Son". O'Grady similarly highlights the song's folk-styled guitar contribution with underlying hints of bluegrass, comparing it to another of McCartney's 1965 compositions, "I'm Looking Through You". He writes that both songs "[demonstrate] a split personality" through joining pop-rock with either folk or country-western.

Author Chris Ingham writes "I've Just Seen a Face" indicates the Beatles' continued interest in country music, and music critic Richie Unterberger describes the "almost pure country" song as a continuation on the band's country-influenced work from the previous year, such as their album Beatles for Sale and the song "I'll Cry Instead" from A Hard Day's Night. At the same time, Unterberger counts the song as one of several Help! tracks that display the influence of folk rock on the Beatles. By contrast, O'Grady writes that the song's country-influenced vocals are sung over an instrumental accompaniment "devoid of any specific rock and roll gesture", and concludes it is the Beatles' "first authentically country-western (as opposed to country-rock or rockabilly) song".

=== Lyrics ===
Written in a conversational style, the lyrics of "I've Just Seen a Face" describe a love at first sight. Sung without pauses for breath or punctuation, the song conveys an adrenaline rush the singer experiences that makes him both enthusiastic and inarticulate. Author Jonathan Gould groups "I've Just Seen a Face" with several of McCartney's 1965 compositions that deal with face-to-face encounters, including "Tell Me What You See", "You Won't See Me", "We Can Work It Out" and "I'm Looking Through You". Musicologist Naphtali Wagner instead categorises it with later McCartney compositions that "explore ambiguous, elusive and altered states of consciousness", such as "Got to Get You into My Life" from Revolver (1966) and "Fixing a Hole" from Sgt. Pepper's Lonely Hearts Club Band (1967).

The lyrics are constructed using an irregular rhyme scheme, using both run-on verses and alliterations. McCartney later described them as insistent in quality, "dragging you forward ... pulling you to the next line". Rhyming every two beats, the lyrics use a series of cascading rhymes ("I have never known/The like of this/I've been alone/And I have missed"). (Note: Recorded a day after "I've Just Seen a Face", the song "It's Only Love" sometimes employs similar phrasing patterns. Everett hypothesises that Lennon composed "It's Only Love" in an attempt to match the rhyming effect of "I've Just Seen a Face", but ultimately finds it "Lennon's most forced effort at rhyming".) Appoggiaturas are used throughout for rhymes to line-up, such as "face" and "place" in the song's intro. The ends of stanzas are wordless, using vocal cadences like "lie-die-die-dat-'n'-die" that echo the descent of the song's instrumental intro (scale degrees –––––).

== Production ==
=== Recording ===
Having completed the filming of Help! on 11 May 1965, the Beatles recorded "I've Just Seen a Face" during the first of three sessions dedicated to filling out the album with songs not in the film. The session took place in EMI's Studio Two (now part of Abbey Road Studios) on 14 June, George Martin producing with assistance from balance engineer Norman Smith. During the same afternoon session, the band recorded McCartney's new rock and roll song "I'm Down" before breaking for dinner and returning to begin work on "Yesterday". The three songs of divergent styles reflected the range of McCartney's compositional abilities; author and musician John Kruth calls it "McCartney's famous marathon session". (Note: Author Adam Gopnik describes the day as "a memorable high-water mark in musical history", while Sheffield and McCartney each comment that it provides a sense of the Beatles' quick recording practices.)

Taped on four-track recording equipment, the song consists of two backing tracks. On the first, George Harrison plays Lennon's Framus Hootenanny acoustic twelve-string guitar, McCartney his Epiphone Texan nylon-string guitar and Ringo Starr a snare drum with brushes. The second includes a lead vocal from McCartney and Lennon playing rhythm guitar with his Gibson J-160E acoustic.

=== Overdubbing and mixing ===
The band taped the basic track in six takes, overdubbing new parts onto take six. McCartney played a higher section in the intro with his Epiphone Texan and added a descant vocal, providing a contrapuntal backing during the refrains in a nasally country and western tone, similar to his backing vocal on another Help! track, "Act Naturally". Adding texture normally achieved with a tambourine, Starr overdubbed maracas on the choruses, while Harrison added a twelve-string acoustic guitar solo. (Note: Among Beatles authors, Gould and John C. Winn each say that Harrison played the solo. Jean-Michael Guesdon & Philippe Margotin write McCartney played it with his Epiphone Texan, but express general uncertainty over what guitar parts McCartney and Harrison contributed.)

Harrison's guitar solo from "I've Just Seen a Face", June 1965
Another acoustic guitar plays during George Harrison's twelve-string guitar solo to provide a contrasting effect.

Employing a technique used extensively during the Help! sessions, another guitar plays simultaneously during the guitar solo to provide a contrasting sound. (Note: The effect appears on their covers of "Dizzy, Miss Lizzy" and "Bad Boy", as well as on "Yes It Is", "The Night Before", "Help!", "It's Only Love" and "Ticket to Ride", where Harrison's opening twelve-string ostinato contrasts with three overdubbed guitars.) Gould writes that, in shifting from cut time to common time during the solo, Harrison's playing is reminiscent of both jazz guitarist Django Reinhardt and the French jazz organisation Le Hot Club. Pollack characterises the solo as a "'countrified', rhythmically flat rendering", and O'Grady writes it "approximates Bluegrass style in rhythmic regularity". "I've Just Seen a Face" features no bass guitar part. (Note: Guesdon and Margotin state the song is the first by the Beatles to not feature a bass guitar. Everett writes the previous year's "I'll Follow the Sun" does not feature the instrument, while Pollack identifies a bass on "Sun".) Music critic Tim Riley suggests the instrument's absence, together with the guitar solo being played on the low-end of the guitar, keeps the song rooted in the country genre.

On 18 June, Martin and Smith mixed several songs on Help! for mono and stereo, including "I've Just Seen a Face". The two mixes of the song are nearly identical to one another. As was typical for their pre-Rubber Soul work, the Beatles participated minimally in the album's mixing process. In 1987, for Help!'s first CD release, Martin remixed the song for stereo, adding a small amount of echo. (Note: When the Beatles' catalogue was remastered for stereo in 2009, the Help! CD retained Martin's 1987 remix. The original stereo mix was included as a bonus on the companion release The Beatles in Mono.)

== Release ==
EMI's Parlophone label released the Help! LP on 6 August 1965. "I've Just Seen a Face" appeared on side two along with six other tracks not in the film, sequenced between "Tell Me What You See" and "Yesterday". McCartney was pleased with the finished recording and it became one of his favourite Beatles songs.

In keeping with the company's policy of reconfiguring the Beatles' albums, Capitol Records removed "I've Just Seen a Face" and the other non-film songs from the North American version of Help!, replacing them with several orchestral pieces from the film's soundtrack. On the band's next album, Rubber Soul, Capitol again altered the track listing; in addition to omitting four songs they deemed "electric", the company selected "I've Just Seen a Face" and Lennon's "It's Only Love" as the opening tracks of side one and side two, respectively. Capitol's approach was motivated by the popularity of folk rock in the United States, with singles such as Sonny & Cher's "I Got You Babe", Barry McGuire's "Eve of Destruction", the Byrds' cover of Bob Dylan's "Mr. Tambourine Man", Simon & Garfunkel's "The Sound of Silence" and the Mamas & the Papas' "California Dreamin'" all representative of the style in 1965. "I've Just Seen a Face" thereby replaced the Memphis sound-inspired "Drive My Car" and was followed by the acoustic song "Norwegian Wood (This Bird Has Flown)".

Released on 6 December 1965, Capitol's version of Rubber Soul was dominated by acoustic-based songs. Many North American listeners therefore erroneously assumed that the Beatles had focused on folk music for an entire LP. Opening with "I've Just Seen a Face" gave Rubber Soul more conceptual unity, which reinforced perceptions of it as a folk or folk rock centred LP, at the cost of distorting the band's late-1965 creative developments and their original artistic intentions. (Note: The album was a commercial success and, according to Gould, served to attract folk-music enthusiasts towards pop music.)

== Retrospective assessment and legacy ==
Reviewing Help! for AllMusic, Stephen Thomas Erlewine describes "I've Just Seen a Face" as "an irresistible folk-rock gem" that is much better than two of McCartney's other contributions to the album, "The Night Before" and "Another Girl", a sentiment author Andrew Grant Jackson echoes. Journalist Alexis Petridis also disparages McCartney's other Help! contributions as filler – in particular, "Another Girl" and "Tell Me What You See" – but describes "I've Just Seen a Face" as the album's "one genuine overlooked gem". He sees it as "an English inversion of Help!'s much-noted Dylan influence", existing partway between the folk sound of Greenwich Village and that of skiffle.

Writing for Pitchfork, Tom Ewing pairs the song with "Yesterday", describing both as a "personal breakthrough for McCartney", with each achieving a "deceptive lightness that would become trademark and millstone for their writer". He recognises "I've Just Seen a Face" as "a folksy country song [that demonstrates] the gift for pastiche that would help give the rest of the Beatles' career such convincing variety". Music critic Allan Kozinn groups it with "Yesterday", "It's Only Love" and "Wait" as songs recorded near the end of the Help! sessions that were a stylistic break from the rest of the album, their "sophistication, spirit and complexity of texture" having more in common with Rubber Soul.

In 2010, Rolling Stone ranked "I've Just Seen a Face" at number 58 in a list of the Beatles' 100 greatest songs, and a 2014 readers' poll conducted by the magazine ranked it as the tenth best Beatles song from the pre-Rubber Soul era. McCartney biographer Peter Ames Carlin calls the song one of McCartney's most overlooked Beatles contributions, yet also one of his best, and Riley similarly counts it as McCartney's second best contribution to Help! after "Yesterday". Riley, Carlin and Everett each praise the song's lyricism, MacDonald commenting that its internal rhyming and fast-paced delivery "complements the music perfectly". In MacDonald's opinion the song elevates the second side of Help! with its "quickfire freshness" and he describes it as a "pop parallel" to several 1965 Swinging London films, such as The Knack ... and How to Get It, Darling and Catch Us If You Can. Music critic Rob Sheffield describes the North American Rubber Soul's sequencing of "I've Just Seen a Face" and "Norwegian Wood (This Bird Has Flown)" as a "magnificent one-two punch" which results in "the only case where the shamefully butchered U.S. LP might top the U.K. original". He judges the song the "most romantic [ever]", while managing to be "almost as funny as 'Drive My Car'". Describing the song as "fetching, vintage McCartney" and a "warm, cheerful folk-rock treasure", journalist Mark Hertsgaard admires its "thigh-slapping beat, sing-along melody, and cheerful, isn't-love-great lyrics"; he deems it "the musical equivalent of an armful of freshly picked daisies".

Unterberger describes "I've Just Seen a Face" as "probably the most bluegrass-soaked rock song of the 1960s". John Kruth says its influence can be heard on "Go and Say Goodbye", the original opening track of Buffalo Springfield's 1966 debut album. Kruth argues that both songs helped acquaint rock fans with small doses of country music, setting up the turn from folk rock to country by the Byrds with their 1968 album Sweetheart of the Rodeo; in Kruth's opinion, the song's "deep wooden timbre" can be heard in the music of Crosby, Stills & Nash; James Taylor and Jackson Browne. Reflecting in 2006 on the Beatles' legacy and influence, journalist Greg Kot views the song's folk styling as exemplifying the Beatles' musical fluency and ability to master genres far removed from their rock music origins.

== McCartney live versions ==
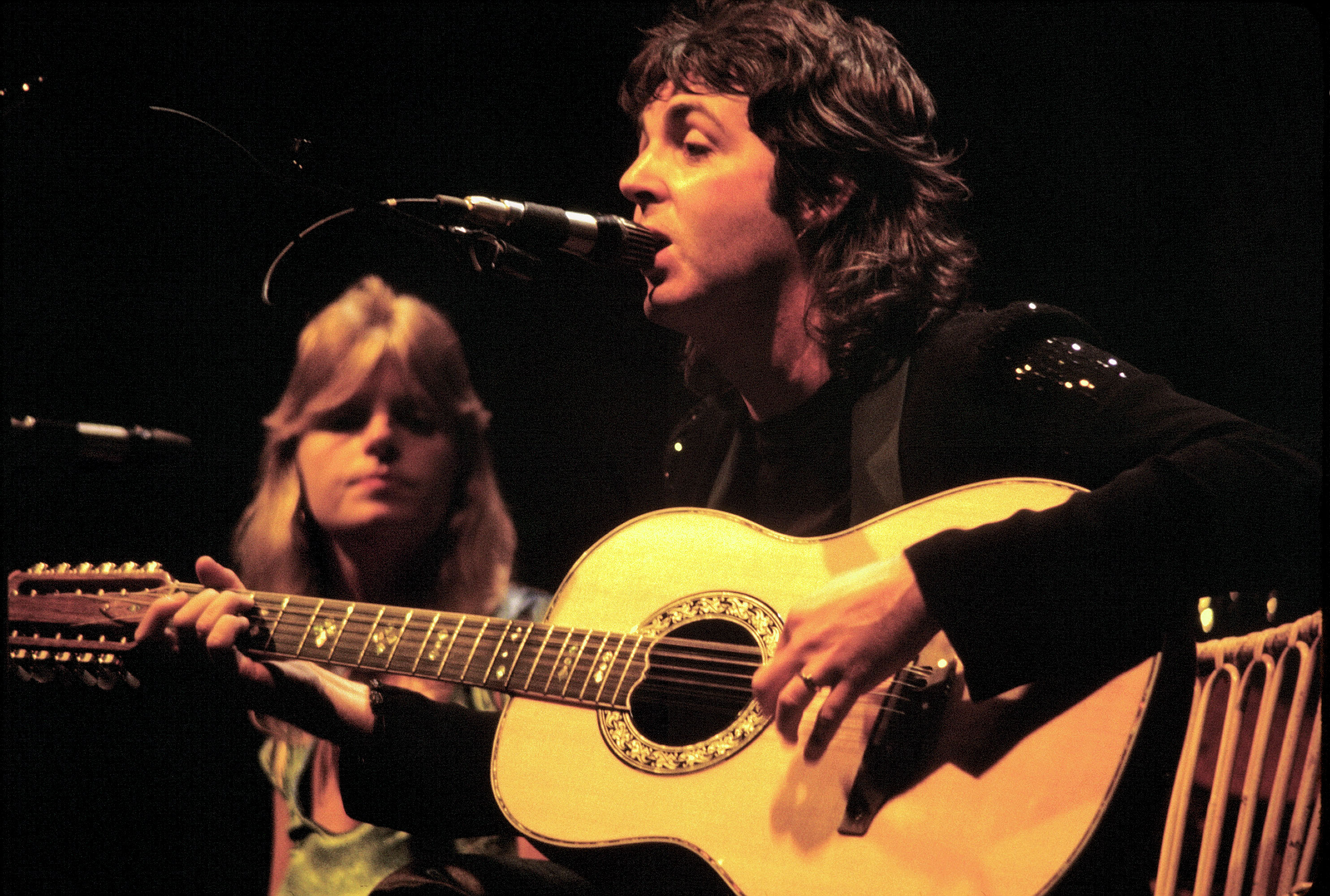
McCartney performing during the Wings Over the World tour, 1976. He included "I've Just Seen a Face" during an acoustic section of the tour's setlist.

The song has remained a favourite of McCartney's in his post-Beatles career and is one of the few Beatles songs he played with his later band, Wings. An acoustic rendition of "I've Just Seen a Face" was among the five Beatles songs McCartney played during the 1975–76 Wings Over the World tour, being the first time he included Beatles songs in his live setlist. (Note: The other picks included "Lady Madonna", "The Long and Winding Road", "Yesterday" and "Blackbird".) Beatles author Robert Rodriguez calls the pick unexpected, and McCartney explained contemporaneously that he picked the songs "at random ... I didn't want to get too precious about it". Journalist Nicholas Schaffner writes that their inclusion "electrified audiences", and Rodriguez similarly describes the Beatles section of the setlist as the "emotional highlight for most attendees". McCartney reflected at the time, "They're great tunes ... So I just decided in the end, this isn't such a big deal, I'll do them." In a retrospective assessment, Riley lauds McCartney for performing the song during the tour as though he were "sitting around on a porch harmonizing to a good old rural favorite". Live versions of the song from the tour were later included on the 1976 triple live album Wings over America and in the 1980 concert film Rockshow.

McCartney performed "I've Just Seen a Face" in a 25 January 1991 set, played on acoustic and filmed by MTV for their series Unplugged. The performance was later included on his 1991 album Unplugged (The Official Bootleg). He has played the song live on several other occasions, including it in the setlist of his 2004 Summer Tour and 2011–12 On the Run tour, and it was included on the 2005 DVD Paul McCartney in Red Square. In 2015, during the Saturday Night Live 40th Anniversary Special, he and musician Paul Simon played an impromptu duet of the song.

== Cover versions ==
=== Charles River Valley Boys ===
"I've Just Seen a Face"

Song by Charles River Valley Boys

from the album Beatle Country
- Released: November 1966
- Recorded: September 1966
- Studio: Columbia, Nashville
- Genre: Bluegrass
- Length: 2:39
- Label: Elektra
- Songwriter: Lennon–McCartney
- Producers: Paul A. Rothchild; Peter K. Siegel

Licensed audio
- "I've Just Seen A Face" on YouTube

The Cambridge, Massachusetts-based Charles River Valley Boys (CRVB) recorded a cover of "I've Just Seen a Face" for their 1966 album, Beatle Country, a collection of Lennon–McCartney compositions played as bluegrass and sung in a high lonesome style. James Field of the group later recalled hearing the song on the radio in the lead up to the US release of Rubber Soul and thinking "it instantly felt like bluegrass". In particular, the I–vi–IV–V progression and the chorus beginning on the dominant had "a drive perfectly suited for a straight-ahead bluegrass trio". He added: "The tempo (for us) is about 115 bpm, and if you listen to many bluegrass standards, a lot of them are in that range. Why? Because it's perfect for the banjo. You get a nice, bouncy roll, and you can make it ring." Banjoist Bob Siggins stated: "I think the instantaneous 'feel' of the song was the tipoff for me ... additionally, the lyrics could easily be (and in fact became) bluegrass lyrics." With their usual setlist made up of old and new bluegrass and country songs, the band added an arrangement of "I've Just Seen a Face" to their set, along with the country-inflected Beatles song "What Goes On".

Produced by Paul A. Rothchild and co-produced by Peter K. Siegel, recording for Beatle Country took place in September 1966 at the Columbia Studios in Nashville, Tennessee. The CRVB's cover of "I've Just Seen a Face" changes the composition in several ways, including transposing it from the key of A to G. Structurally, the CRVB add extra instrumental breaks for banjo, mandolin and fiddle – a typical feature of bluegrass music, where each musician is allowed the chance to solo – as well as repeating the chorus an extra time, which musicologist Laura Turner writes serves to emphasise the "quintessential bluegrass technique" of close three-part harmonies. She describes the biggest differences between versions as their different textures and timbres, in particular the "incessant, 'walking' upright bass line that provides energetic drive, sparking mandolin tremolo, rolling banjo figures, and intricate, often double-stopped fiddle motifs that permeate the texture."

Elektra released Beatle Country in November 1966. "I've Just Seen a Face" was the LP's opening track, and Field later characterised the song as the foundation piece of the entire album. A contemporary review in Cash Box magazine counts the cover as one of the five best tracks on the album, and a retrospective assessment by John Paul of the online magazine Spectrum Culture describes it as "like a lost bluegrass standard". When the Boston Bluegrass Union awarded the CRVB the Heritage Award in 2013, "I've Just Seen a Face" was among the songs the band performed during the award ceremony at the city's annual Joe Val Bluegrass Festival.

=== Bluegrass groups ===
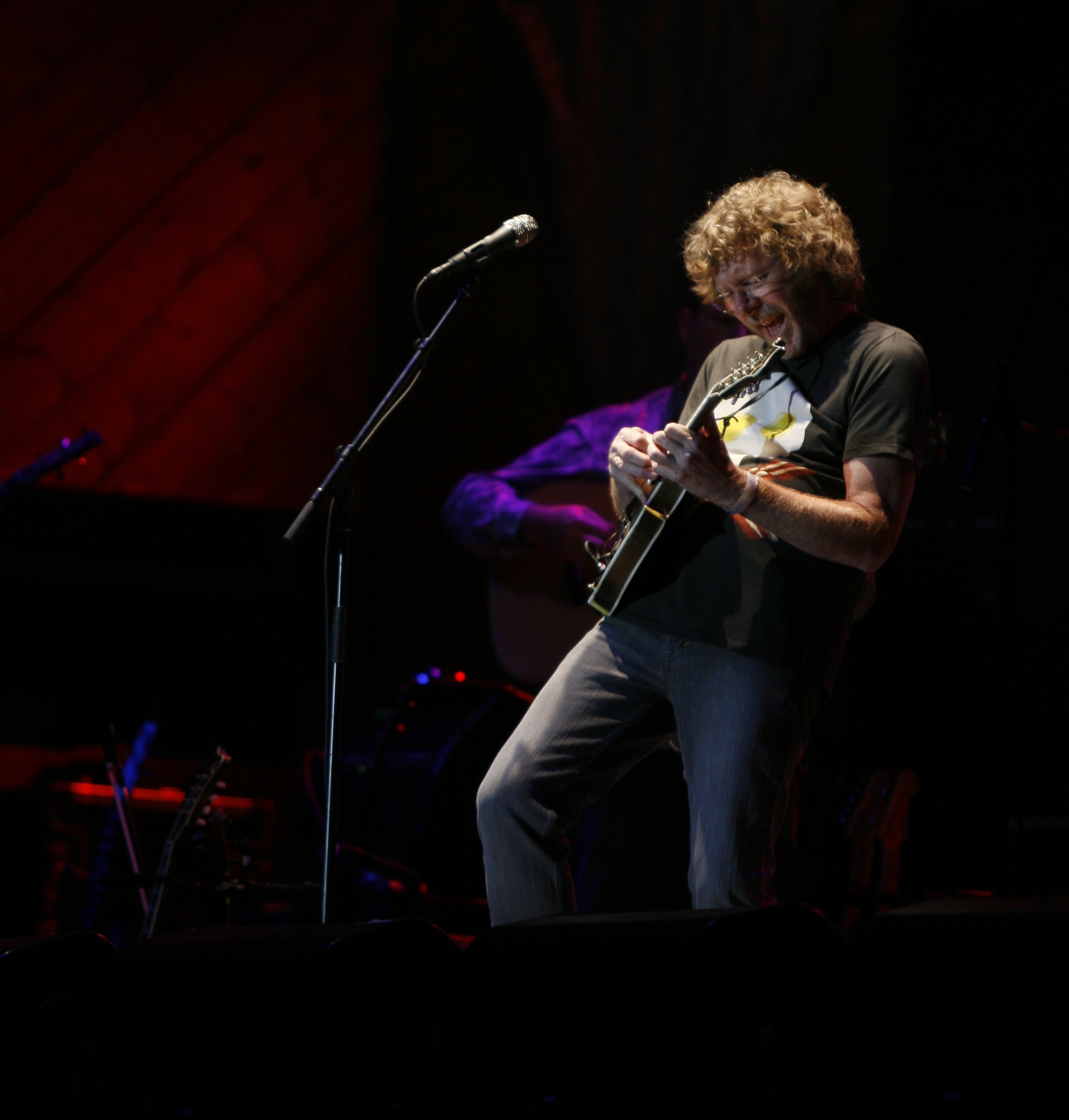
New Grass Revival mandolinist Sam Bush in 2012, who described "I've Just Seen a Face" as the first song by the Beatles to which he could relate.

Besides the Charles River Valley Boys, numerous bluegrass groups have covered the song. Doggett writes the tempo and chord changes of "I've Just Seen a Face" "[cry] out for a banjo and mandolin", and Turner argues it has been "key in stimulating a relationship between bluegrass and the music of the Beatles". The progressive bluegrass band the Dillards recorded a cover of the song between the British release of Help! and the North American release of Rubber Soul; they had hoped to issue the song in the US before the Beatles, though the recording went unreleased. They later recorded a cover for their 1968 album Wheatstraw Suite. Joining elements of traditional mountain music and modern country music, their version includes high harmonies, a banjo and a pedal steel guitar. Unterberger calls it "a respectable version" which "completed [the Dillards'] move from bluegrass into folk-country-rock", while Turner describes it as "relaxed in tempo and wistful", writing that its use of a pedal steel guitar is "a clear salute to the flourishing folk-rock scene". Kruth suggests that the finished recording influenced bands like the Byrds, the Grateful Dead and the Eagles.

Sam Bush, mandolinist for the progressive bluegrass band New Grass Revival, recalled being uninterested in rock music before the mid-1960s, but found that "I've Just Seen a Face" allowed him to "relate to the Beatles for the first time", agreeing with a characterisation of it as "bluegrass without a banjo". New Grass Revival subsequently covered the song with musician Leon Russell for their 1981 live album, The Live Album, a version Turner calls "hard driving" and "erratic". Bush later covered the song as a solo artist for the 2013 Americana tribute album, Let Us in Americana: The Music of Paul McCartney. The group Bluegrass Association recorded the song for their 1974 album Strings Today ... And Yesterday, basing their arrangement on the Charles River Valley Boys' version.

=== Other artists ===
George Martin recorded an orchestral version of the song for his 1965 easy listening album, George Martin & His Orchestra Play Help!, credited under its original working title, "Auntie Gin's Theme". In a review of the album for AllMusic, Bruce Eder describes Martin's recordings as "tasteful but otherwise largely undistinguished". He credits the release of tracks under their working titles as one of the album's unique selling points, being "details that Beatles fanatics of the time simply devoured". The Grateful Dead performed the song in concert on 11 June 1969 in San Francisco, playing pseudonymously as Bobby Ace and the Cards from the Bottom of the Deck, and former Grateful Dead keyboardist Tom Constanten recorded a cover for his 1993 album Morning Dew. Hank Crawford, the alto saxophonist of Ray Charles, recorded a funk and reggae-inspired version of the song for his 1976 album Tico Rico.

Canadian jazz singer Holly Cole covered the song for her 1997 album Dark Dear Heart. Released with a noir-style music video, the version reached number seven on Canada's RPM Top Singles Chart in November 1997.

The 2007 jukebox musical romantic drama film Across the Universe features a cover of the song, later included on its associated soundtrack album. In the film, the lead character, Jude (Jim Sturgess), sings about Lucy (Evan Rachel Wood) at a bowling alley in what Kruth terms a "somewhat bizarre love-fantasy scene". Reviewing the soundtrack for AllMusic, Erlewine writes that Sturgess does "a credible job" on the song's "rockabilly revamp".

American singer Brandi Carlile occasionally sings the song during live shows. Though Kruth disparages Carlile's version as "[not] particularly different or innovative", a 2010 ranking by Paste magazine of the 50 best Beatles covers placed it at 46, writing that she transforms the song into a "sing-along hoe-down". Kruth designates "I'll Just Bleed Your Face" as the song's "most bizarre" cover, recorded by Beatallica – a mashup group of heavy metal band Metallica and the Beatles – for their 2009 album Masterful Mystery Tour.

== Personnel ==
According to Walter Everett, except where noted:

- Paul McCartney – lead and harmony vocals, nylon-string guitar
- John Lennon – acoustic rhythm guitar
- George Harrison – acoustic twelve-string guitar
- Ringo Starr – drums (with brushes), maracas
