= Glenn Snoddy =

American audio engineer

- Born: May 4, 1922; Shelbyville, Tenn.
- Died: May 21, 2018; Murfreesboro, Tenn.
- Occupation: Recording engineer
- Known for: Inadvertently producing the first fuzz tone

Glenn Snoddy (May 4, 1922 – May 21, 2018) was an engineer and recording studio owner in Nashville, Tennessee. He recorded major Country and Folk artists such as Johnny Cash and Hank Williams.

He is credited with inadvertently producing the first Fuzz tone in 1961.

== Career ==
Glenn Snoddy, a World War II veteran, learned about radio and recording while serving in the U.S. Army. After the war, he began his career as a radio engineer and worked his way up to the famed Nashville clear-channel AM radio station WSM. Snoddy also worked as a recording engineer at Castle Studios, and after Owen Bradley established Bradley Studios, he persuaded Snoddy to work there full-time in 1955.

In 1961, While engineering Marty Robbins' song, Don't Worry at Bradley Studios, a technical malfunction unexpectedly transformed session musician Grady Martin's Danelectro six-string baritone guitar tone into an unusual distorted sound. Some accounts report that the transformer of Martin's amplifier was damaged. However, it appears that a defect in the mixing console had produced this unique sound. "I'm pretty sure what happened was the primary transformer opened up, causing session player Grady Martin's guitar sound to go from clean to bludgeoning", Snoddy told The Tennessean in 2013.

As Don't Worry topped the country charts and crossed over to the pop charts, the unique sound of the mixing console's faulty channel rapidly became sought after in Nashville studios. But Snoddy was unable to replicate the sound, as the mixing board's transformer had unfortunately stopped working shortly after. "Nancy Sinatra came to town and wanted to use that sound, and I had to tell her people that we didn't have it anymore because the amplifier completely quit. So I had to get busy and conjure some other way to make it happen," Snoddy recalled in a 2013 Vintage Guitar magazine interview.

Snoddy decided to team-up with fellow WSM radio engineer Revis Virgil Hobbs to build a stand-alone device entirely based around three 1n270 germanium transistors that would intentionally recreate the novel fuzzy effect. The Fuzz-Tone was born. The two engineers sold their circuit to Gibson, who commercialized the device in 1962 under the name Maestro FZ-1 Fuzz-Tone. While the initial run of 5000 units was a commercial failure, sales soared after The Rolling Stones' Keith Richards used an FZ-1 to record the main riff of the band's hit 1965 song (I Can't Get No) Satisfaction.

Snoddy continued working at Bradley Studios (which became Columbia Studios in 1962) until 1967.

=== Woodland Sound Studios ===
That year he opened Woodland Sound Studios, a recording studio that recorded artists such as Neil Young, Tammy Wynette, Nitty Gritty Dirt Band among many others. Kansas' Dust in the Wind was recorded at Woodland in 1977. Snoddy sold the studios to AVI in 1980 but continued to work at Woodland for the next 10 years.
