= The Lilly Brothers =

- Origin: West Virginia; Boston, Massachusetts, US
- Genres: Bluegrass
- Occupation: Bluegrass artists
- Years active: 1950s–70s
- Past members: Michael Burt "Bea" Lilly; Charles Everett Lilly; Don Stover; Benjamin F. Logan; Joe Val

The Lilly Brothers, (Bea Lilly, born Michael Burt Lilly, December 15, 1921 – September 18, 2005 and brother Everett Lilly, born July 1, 1924 – May 8, 2012) were bluegrass musicians born in Clear Creek, West Virginia. They have been credited with bringing bluegrass to New England and with influencing such future bluegrass artists as Peter Rowan, Joe Val and Bill Keith, among others.

== Biography ==
Influenced by the traditional music they heard in their youth, Bea began playing the guitar and Everett the mandolin. In 1938, they made their radio debut on the Old Farm Hour show at WCHS in Charleston, West Virginia. Other radio works followed at WJLS in Beckley, West Virginia and on several other Southern radio stations during the 1940s. In 1945, they appeared on the Molly O'Day radio show at WNOX in Knoxville, Tennessee. In 1948, the brothers signed with the WWVA Jamboree in Wheeling, West Virginia as members of "Red Belcher's Kentucky Ridge Runners", but they quit two years later because of a financial dispute and the brothers retired temporarily. In 1951, Everett joined Lester Flatt & Earl Scruggs as a mandolin player. The next year, in 1952, 'Tex' Logan, whom they had met at the WWVA Jamboree, persuaded the brothers to reunite.

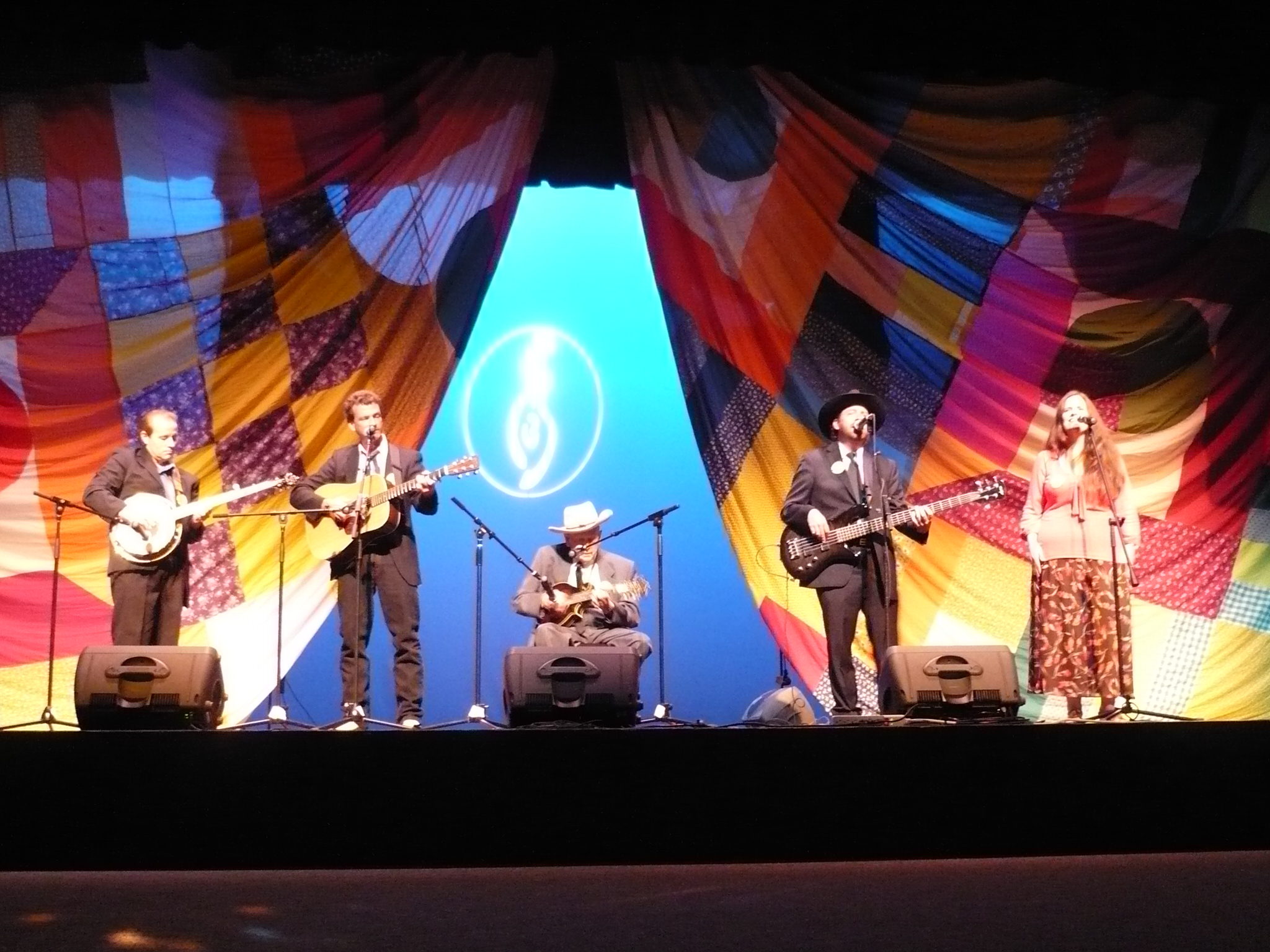
Everett Lilly (center, seated, with mandolin) and the Lilly Mountaineers, in performance in 2009

The Lilly Brothers moved to Boston and formed a group called the "Confederate Mountaineers" who consisted of the brothers on guitar and mandolin, Logan on fiddle, and Don Stover on banjo. They performed on WCOP's Hayloft Jamboree and as a house band at local clubs such as the Plaza Bar, the Mohawk Ranch, and the Hillbilly Ranch. Soon, they were making records for the Folkways, Prestige and Event labels. Somewhere along the line they changed the group's name to the Lilly Brothers.

In the 1960s they appeared in concerts at several major colleges and at folk festivals. The personnel of the Lilly Brothers didn't change between 1952 and 1970 and is considered one of bluegrass music's most stable lineups. The death of Everett Lilly's son, Giles, in a car crash in 1970 brought to an end the brothers' career in Boston and Everett left the town. For the remainder of the 1970s, the brothers would reunite on several occasions. In 1973, the Lilly Brothers made a tremendously successful tour of Japan, including the release of three live albums. The Lilly Brothers' career was later chronicled in a 1979 documentary "True Facts in a Country Song". In the 1980s, as Bea retired, Everett and his son Mark played together in the group "Clear Creek Crossin'".

Everett Lilly continued to play and perform with his sons in a band called Everett Lilly and the Lilly Mountaineers until his death in 2012.

== Afterwards ==
Joe Val once said of the Confederate Mountaineers' influence on urban Massachusetts, Those guys hit on like a bombshell. Nobody'd ever heard anything like that before.

== Inductions ==
- In 1986. the Lilly Brothers were inducted into the Massachusetts Country Music Hall of Fame and Don Stover was inducted the following year.
- On October 17, 2002, the Lilly Brothers and Don Stover were inducted into the International Bluegrass Music Hall of Fame.
- In November 2008, the Lilly Brothers were inducted into the West Virginia Music Hall of Fame.

== Discography ==
=== 78 RPM ===
Year	Song titles	Label	Number
1948	"What Are They Doing in Heaven" / "They Sleep Together Now at Rest"	Page	505
1957	"Tragic Romance" / "Are You Tired of Me, My Darling"	Event	E-4261
1959	"John Henry" / "Bring Back My Blue-Eyed Boy to Me"	Event	E-4272

=== Albums ===
Year	Title	Label	Number	Notes
1962	Folk Songs From the Southern Mountains	Folkways	FA 2433	one side with Don Stover
1963	Bluegrass Breakdown	Prestige Folklore	FL14010	with Don Stover
1964	The Country Songs of the Lilly Brothers	Prestige Folklore	FL14035	with Everett Alan Lilly
1970	Early Recordings	County	729	with Don Stover, recorded 1956–57
1973	What Will I Leave Behind	County	742	with Don Stover
1974	Holiday in Japan, Part 1	Towa	TWA 101S	with Don Stover & Everett Alan Lilly live in Japan
1974	Holiday in Japan, Part 2	Towa	TWA 102S	with Don Stover & Everett Alan Lilly live in Japan
1974	Holiday in Japan, Part 3	Towa	TWA 103S	with Don Stover & Everett Alan Lilly live in Japan
1996	Live at Hillbilly Ranch	Hay Holler	HHCD1333	recorded in Boston, July 1967
2001	Live at Tamarack 2001	Lilly Bros	5704	with the Lilly Mountaineers
2002	On the Radio 1952–1953	Rounder	1109	with Don Stover
2003	West Virginia, Oh How I Miss You	Lilly Bros		with the Lilly Mountaineers

=== Compilations and reissues ===
Year	Title	Label	Number	Notes
1977	Bluegrass Breakdown	Rounder	SS01	reissue of Prestige FL14010
1977	The Lilly Brothers – Country Songs	Rounder	SS02	reissue of Prestige FL14035
1991	Early Recordings	Rebel	1688	reissue of County 729
1999	The Prestige/Folklore Years, Vol 5: Have a Feast Here Tonight	Prestige	9919	CD reissue of Prestige FL14010 and FL14035
2001	Newport Folk Festival – Best of Bluegrass 1959–66	Vanguard	VCD-187-89-2	2-CD set, includes 5 live tracks by the Lilly Brothers
2003	What Will I Leave Behind	Rebel	1788	reissue of County 742
2005	Bluegrass at the Roots	Folkways	SWF40158	reissue of Folkways FA2433 plus 2 unreleased tracks

=== Video appearances ===
Year	Title	Label	Formats	Notes
1979	"True Facts in a Country Song"	Burt/Chadwick	16mm/DVD	29-minute documentary by Susan Burt & Doug Chadwick
2005	Festival!	Eagle Vision	DVD	Newport Folk Festival 1963–66, with Don Stover, Tex Logan, and Everett Alan Lilly
2006	Bluegrass Country Soul	Time Life	DVD	Camp Springs, NC Bluegrass Festival 1971, various artists
