= John Byrne Cooke =

American author

- Born: October 5, 1940; New York City, U.S.
- Died: September 3, 2017 (aged 76); Jackson, Wyoming, U.S.
- Education: Harvard University
- Occupations: Author; musician; photographer
- Website: https://www.johnbyrnecooke.com/

John Byrne Cooke (October 5, 1940 – September 3, 2017) was an American author, musician, and photographer. He was the son of the English-born writer and broadcaster Alistair Cooke, and the great-grandnephew of Ralph Waldo Emerson.

In the 1960s he played with the bluegrass band, the Charles River Valley Boys, and was Janis Joplin's road manager from 1967 until her death in 1970. He wrote On the Road with Janis Joplin, detailing the period of Joplin's life from her first appearance at the Monterey Pop Festival until her death.

Cooke wrote several Western fiction novels, and book reviews for The New York Times, The Washington Post, and the Los Angeles Times. Cooke lived in Jackson Hole, Wyoming from 1982 until his death from cancer in 2017, aged 76.
