= Don Stover =

American Bluegrass musician (1928–1996)

- Born: March 6, 1928; Ameagle, West Virginia
- Died: November 11, 1996 (aged 68) Brandywine, Maryland
- Genre: Bluegrass music
- Instrument: Banjo
- Formerly of: The Lilly Brothers; White Oak Mountain Boys

Don Stover (March 6, 1928 – November 11, 1996) was an American Bluegrass musician. He toured with numerous bands, most notably The Lilly Brothers. He is a member of both the Massachusetts Country Music Hall of Fame and the International Bluegrass Music Hall of Fame,

== Career ==
Stover was born on March 6, 1928 and learned to play banjo from his mother, Dolly Sumner. He worked full-time as coal miner and played part-time in the band Coal River Valley Boys. He later joined The Lilly Brothers & Don Stover when the group moved to Boston, Massachusetts in 1952. At the time, the group was known as the Confederate Mountaineers and worked in various clubs which included the Hillbilly Ranch. The group was credited with introducing New England to Bluegrass music.

Stover played banjo for Bill Monroe in 1957. Over the period of six months, they produced 11 recordings, including a remake of "Molly and Tenbrooks." The tracks became part of Monroe's 1958 album Knee Deep in Blue Grass. After his time with The Lilly Brothers, Stover formed White Oak Mountain Boys. He later moved to Maryland where he worked with musicians such as Bill Clifton and Red Rector.

Stover was inducted to the Massachusetts Country Music Hall of Fame in 1987, the year after The Lilly Brothers earned the same. He is also a member of the International Bluegrass Music Hall of Fame where he was inducted in 2002 along with other members of The Lilly Brothers & Don Stover.

Stover died on Veterans Day, November 11, 1996..

== Discography ==
Solo

- Things In Life (Rounder Records, 1972)
- Live At Davis & Elkins College (White Oak Records WO-102, 1990)

With Lilly Brothers

- Early Recordings (County Records, 1970)
- Folk Songs From The Southern Mountains (Folkways Records, 1962)
- Holiday In Japan, Part 1 (Towa Records TWA-101, 1974)
- Holiday In Japan, Part 2 (Towa Records TWA-102, 1974)
- Holiday In Japan, Part 3 (Towa Records TWA-103, 1974)
- What Will I Leave Behind (Rebel Records, REB-CD-1788, 2003)
- Live In Tokyo, Japan Part 1 (Not On Label, 1974)
- Live In Tokyo, Japan Part 2 (Not On Label LB-5136, 1974)

With The White Oak Mountain Boys

- West Virginia Coal Miner's Blues (Old Homestead Records OHS90011, 12048, 12049, 1972)
- Don Stover And The White Oak Mountain Boys (Rounder Records, 1974)

With Everett Alan Lilly

- Down Home Guitar (Towa Records TWA-104-S, 1975)

With friends

- Don Stover & Friends (White Oak Records WO-101, NR18145, 1989)

With Mac Martin

- Live At “The Moose"! (White Oak Records WO-103, 1993)

With A.G. & Kate and Red Rector

- Good Friends Vol. 1 & 2 (Sheppey Records And Publications CD45A/B, 2017)

Singles & EPs

- Tragic Romance / Are You Tired Of Me My Darlin' (with Lilly Brothers) (Event Records E-4261, 1957)
- My Ship Will Sail with (A.G. & Kate and Red Rector) (Strictly Country Records SCR 45-1, 1975)

Compilations

- Lilly Brothers - Live At Hillbilly Ranch (Hay Holler Records HH-CD-1333, 1996)
- Lilly Brothers – The Prestige/Folklore Years. Vol. 5, Have A Feast Here Tonight (Fantasy, PRCD 9919-2, Volume 5, 1999)
- The Lilly Brothers – On The Radio 1952-1953 (Rounder Select ROUNDER 82161-1109-2, 2002)
