= Elisabeth Hamilton Friermood =

American writer

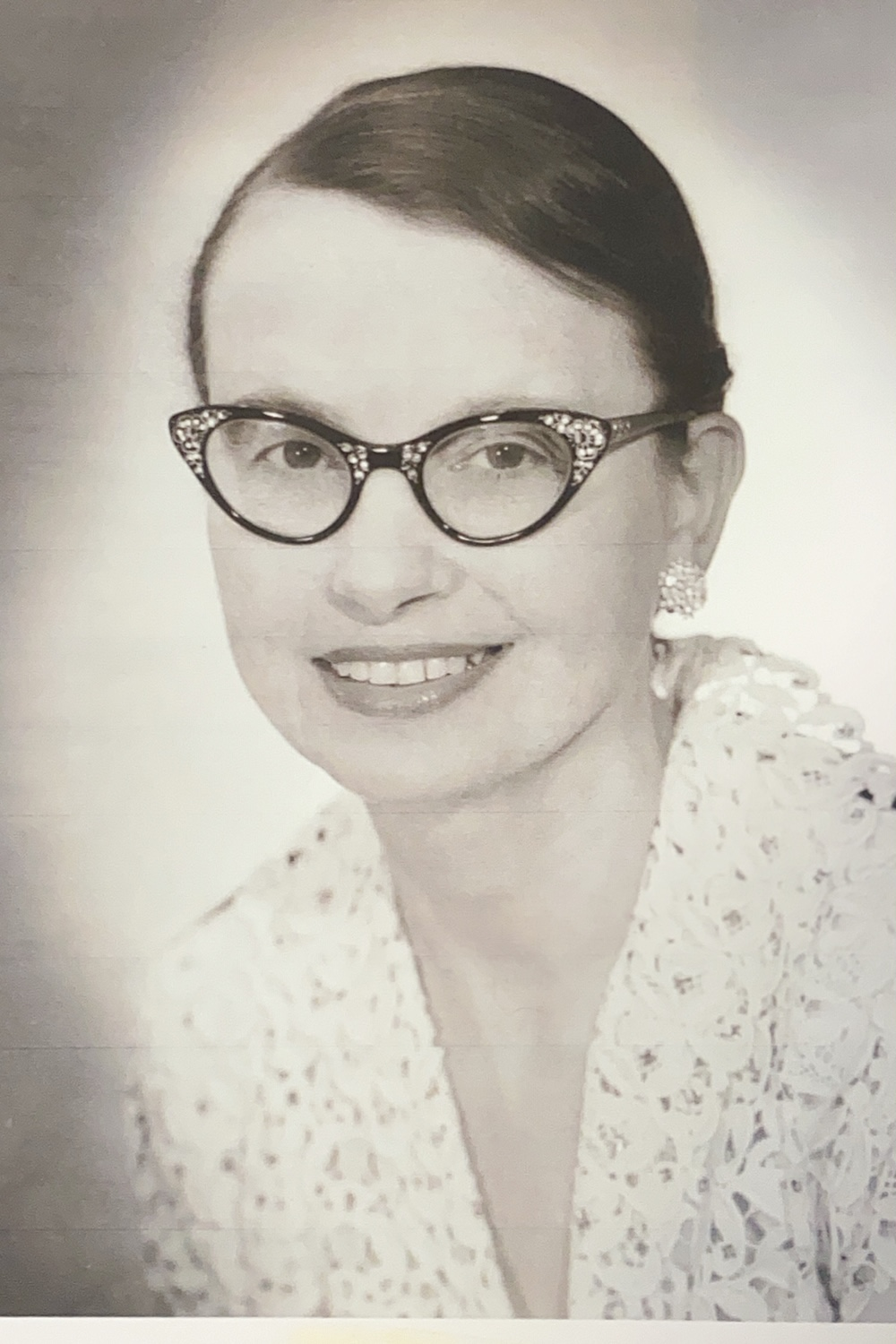
- Born: Elisabeth Hamilton; December 30, 1903 Marion, Indiana
- Died: March 25, 1992 (aged 88)

Elisabeth Hamilton Friermood (December 30, 1903 – March 25, 1992) was an American storyteller, librarian, and author of historical fiction for young adult readers.

Friermood (née Elisabeth Hamilton) was born in Marion, Indiana, to parents Burr Hamilton (a firefighter) and Etta Hale Hamilton. In 1928, she married Harold T. Friermood, author of The YMCA Guide to Adult Fitness. She and her husband collaborated on an autobiography, Frier and Elisabeth, which was published in 1979.

Friermood's experience as a children's librarian (in the Marion Public Library and the Dayton Public Library) inspired several of her characters. Her historical fiction was extremely well researched, and included books set in the Midwest in the 1800s describing pioneer life, the Spanish American war, the Underground Railroad, and two books about the Wabash River. She also contributed articles and stories to Horn Book Magazine, Story Parade and Seashore Press publications. Her works were published by Doubleday.

== Selected works ==
- The Wabash Knows the Secret (1951)
- Geneva Summer: A Romance of College Camp (1952) OCLC 1652990
- Hoosier heritage (1954)
- Candle in the Sun (1955)
- That Jones Girl (1956) OCLC 300889
- Jo Allen's Predicament (1959)
- Head High, Ellen Brody (1958) (nominated for the Sequoyah Book Award in 1960)
- Promises in the Attic (1960) OCLC 426968
- The luck of Daphne Tolliver (1961)
- Ballad of Calamity Creek (1962)
- The wild Donahues (1963)
- Whispering Willows (1964)
- Doc Dudley's Daughter (1965)
- Molly's Double Rainbow (1966)
- Circus Sequins (1968)
- Focus the bright land (awarded the Ohioana Book Award for Children's Literature in 1968)
- Peppers' Paradise (1969)
- One of Fred's Girls (1970)
- Frier and Elisabeth, sportsman and storyteller (1979) (published by Vantage Press)
