= Joseph Gordon Vaeth =

US Navy officer and engineer (1921–2012)

- Born: February 12, 1921; New York City
- Died: March 11, 2012 (aged 91); Olympia, Washington
- Burial place: Rock Creek Cemetery
- Other name: J. Gordon Vaeth
- Occupations: Engineer, Author

Joseph Gordon Vaeth (1921–2012) was an officer in the United States Navy and a civilian aeronautical engineer employed by the Office of Naval Research and the National Oceanic and Atmospheric Administration (NOAA). Vaeth was a lifelong advocate for the use of lighter-than-air aircraft. He was the author of eight books and numerous articles.

== Early life ==
Vaeth was the son of Joseph Anthony Vaeth (d. 1938), a New York University professor of languages, and his wife Sara (Billard) Vaeth, the sister of Coast Guard Commandant Frederick C. Billard. In 1941, he graduated from New York University with a Bachelor's of Arts; in September 1941, he was employed as an instructor at the Admiral Billard Academy, named for his uncle.

== Career ==
During World War II, Vaeth was commissioned as a Lieutenant and commanded the US Navy airship fleet in the South Atlantic. After the war, Vaeth was employed by the Navy Special Devices Center, and was involved in Project Helios, a plan for a manned balloon flight to 100,000 feet. He was a member of the American Rocketry Society, the British Interplanetary Society, the Institute of Aeronautical Sciences and the League of Aeronauts.

Vaeth worked with the naval unit at the White Sands Proving Ground, and in 1951, he authored 200 Miles Up, a history of guided missile development. In 1955, he was quoted in press about US plans to launch an artificial satellite. Vaeth served as an aeronautical engineer with the Office of Naval Research. In 1960, he was employed as a human spaceflight expert by Reflectone Electronics. In the 1970s, Vaeth served as Director of Systems Engineering for National Oceanic and Atmospheric Administration. In 1977, Vaeth published an article concluding that Amelia Earhart likely died after running out of fuel.

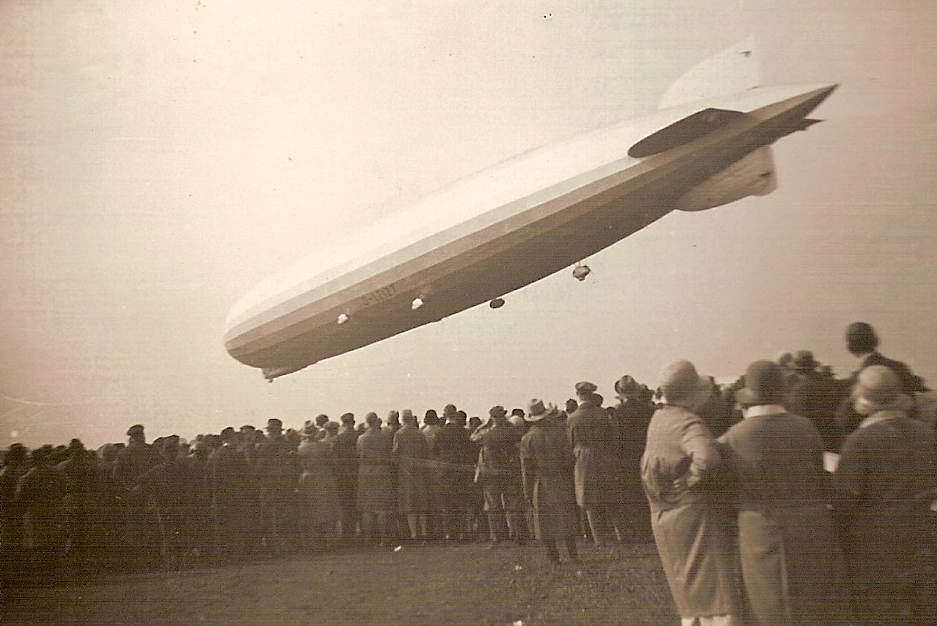
The Graf Zeppelin airship was the subject of Vaeth's 1959 book

Veath was a longtime advocate of airships. Journalist James J. Kilpatrick said that Vaeth:

is known around our office as 'the airship man.' Mr. Vaeth, a former naval officer, [was] system director of engineering for the National Environmental Satellite Service. His other fulltime job, a labor of pure love, [was] to promote the airship revival. In the same way that other men are nuts about fire engines or steam locomotives, Mr. Vaeth [was] nuts about zeppelins.

As early as 1939, Veath was advocating for the use of airships. In 1959, Vaeth authored a book about the Graf Zeppelin airship. In 1963, papers carried an image of Vaeth holding a piece of wreckage from the USS Shenandoah, a dirigible which crashed in 1925. In 1974, Vaeth testified before the United States Senate Committee on Aeronautical and Space Sciences about the possibility of nuclear-engines permitting dirigibles to achieve speeds up to 150 miles per hours.

== Personal life ==
In 1951, Vaeth married Joanne Corell; the two had a son. After her death, in 1995 he married Corrine Ranken of Olympia, Washington.

== Works ==
- Vaeth, J. Gordon (1951). 200 miles up : the conquest of the upper air. Ronald Press Co. p. 207.
- Vaeth, J Gordon (1958). Graf Zeppelin: The Adventures of an Aerial Globetrotter. New York: Harper & Brothers., on the Graf Zeppelin
- Vaeth, J. Gordon (1962). To the Ends of the Earth: The Explorations of Roald Amundsen. Harper & Row.
- Vaeth, J. Gordon (1965). Weather eyes in the sky : America's meteorological satellites. Ronald Press, U.S.
- Vaeth, J. Gordon (1968). Langley, man of science and flight. Ronald Press.
- Vaeth, J. Gordon (1968). The man who founded Georgia. Crowell-Collier Press.
- Vaeth, Joseph G. (1992). Blimps & u-boats: U.S. Navy airships in the battle of the Atlantic. Annapolis, Md: Naval Institute Pr. ISBN 978-1557508768.
- Vaeth, J. Gordon (2005). They Sailed the Skies: U.S. Navy Balloons and the Airship Program.
