= List of compositions by John Rutter =

== List of compositions and arrangements ==
John Rutter composed especially choral music, including arrangements.

=== Extended compositions ===
- Suite for Strings (1973)
- Cityscapes (aka Partita) for orchestra (1974)
- Gloria (1974)
- Bang! (opera, 1975)
- The Beatles Concerto (1977)
- Reflections for piano and orchestra (1979)
- Suite Antique (1979)
- Requiem (1985)
- Magnificat (1990)
- Te Deum (1990)
- Mass of the Children (2003)
- Suite Lyrique (2011)
- The Gift of Life: Six Canticles of Creation (2015)
- Visions (2016)
- Four Miniatures for Orchestra (2021)
- Celebration Overture for orchestra (2023)
- Elegy for orchestra (2025)

=== Carols ===
- "All Bells in Paradise" (original composition)
- "Angels' Carol" (original composition)
- "Angel Tidings" (arrangement)
- "Born on Earth" (arrangement)
- "Candlelight Carol" (original composition)
- "Carol of the Children" (original composition)
- "Carol of the Magi" (original composition)
- "Cantique de Noël" (arrangement)
- "Child in a Manger" (arrangement of Gaelic melody 'Bunessan', original words)
- "Christ our Emmanuel" (original composition)
- "Christmas Bells" (arrangement of the Norwegian folk song "Pal Pa Haugen", with new Christmas lyrics by Rutter)
- "Christmas Lullaby"
- "Christmas Night" (arrangement, the title song on the Cambridge Singers's first album)
- "Deck the Hall" (arrangement)
- "The Donkey Carol" (not to be confused with the song "The Friendly Beasts" arranged by John Davis that also goes by the nickname Donkey Carol)
- "Dormi Jesu"
- "Es ist ein Ros entsprungen" (original composition)
- "I Sing of a Maiden" (original composition)
- "I Wish You Christmas"
- "Jesus Child"
- "Joseph’s Carol" (original composition)
- "Joy to the World" (arrangement)
- "Love Came Down at Christmas" (arrangement)
- "Mary's Lullaby"
- "Nativity Carol" (1st line: "Born in a Stable so Bare"; original composition)
- "Personent hodie" (arrangement)
- "Hajej, nynej, Ježíšku" (arrangement and translation of Czech carol called "Hajej, nynej, Ježíšku")
- "Rejoice and Be Merry"
- "Shepherd's Pipe Carol"
- "Silent Night" (arrangement)
- "Star Carol"
- "Suzi's Carol" (original composition)
- "There is a Flower" (original composition)
- "The Twelve Days of Christmas" (arrangement)
- "The Very Best Time of Year"
- "Up Good Christen Folk"
- "We Will"
- "We Wish You a Merry Christmas" (arrangement)
- "Wexford Carol" (arrangement)
- "Was I the lamb?" Setting of words by Marc Bratcher to celebrate the Chaplain's 20 years of service as Chaplain of Merton College.
- "What Sweeter Music"
- "Wild Wood Carol"

==== Other anthems ====
- "All Things Bright and Beautiful (Rutter)", setting the hymn
- "Banquet Fugue"
- "Born on Earth (Rutter)", arrangement of the song
- "I Wonder as I Wander (Rutter)", arrangement of the Christmas carol
- "Look at the world"

=== Choral works ===
- Three Carols from Carols for Choirs 4 for SS and SSA unaccompanied
- Five Childhood Lyrics
- Eight Christmas Carols, Set 1 for mixed voices and piano
- Eight Christmas Carols, Set 2 for mixed voices and piano
- Twelve Christmas Carols, Set 1 for mixed voices and small orchestra or piano
- Twelve Christmas Carols, Set 2 for mixed voices and small orchestra or piano
- "The Twelve Days of Christmas" from Carols for Choirs 2 for soprano, alto, tenor and bass voices ("SATB") and piano or orchestra
- 100 Carols for Choirs ed. Willcocks and Rutter
- Birthday Madrigals for SATB, commissioned in 1995 by Brian Kay and the Cheltenham Bach Choir to celebrate the 75th birthday of George Shearing
- Canticles of America
- Carols for Choirs 2 ed. Willcocks and Rutter
- Carols for Choirs 3 ed. Willcocks and Rutter
- Carols for Choirs 4 ed. Willcocks and Rutter
- Child in a manger from Carols for Choirs 3 for SATB and keyboard or orchestra
- Christiana Canticles (Evening Service in C) for SATB and organ, consisting of the Magnificat and Nunc dimittis, and dedicated to the choir of Christ Church, Christiana Hundred
- Christmas Night for SATB and keyboard or strings
- Come Down, O Love Divine for double mixed choir and organ
- Cradle Song from Carols for Choirs 3 for SATB unaccompanied
- Dancing Day for SSA with harp or piano
- Donkey Carol for SATB and piano or orchestra
- Flemish Carol from Carols for Choirs 3 for SATB and piano or orchestra
- "A Flower Remembered" for SATB or SAA, published with lyrics in both English and Japanese, composed in 2014 to commemorate the victims of the 2011 Tōhoku earthquake and tsunami
- For the beauty of the earth, setting the hymn, for SATB, SA, or TTBB, and piano
- A Gaelic Blessing for SATB and organ or guitar, commissioned in 1978 by the Chancel Choir of the First United Methodist Church, Omaha, Nebraska, in honour of minister of music Mel Olson
- Here We Come a-wassailing from Twelve Christmas Carols, Set 1
- The Holly and the Ivy for SATB and piano or orchestra
- I Believe in Springtime for unison children's choir and piano with optional mixed chorus
- I Saw Three Ships from Carols for Choirs 3 for SATB and piano or orchestra
- I will sing with the spirit for SATB and organ, piano or orchestra
- Joy to the world! for SATB and keyboard or orchestra (2 trumpets, timpani and strings)
- King Jesus hath a garden from Carols for Choirs 3 for SATB and piano or flute, harp and strings
- "Kum ba yah" - a reflective arrangement of the traditional African-American song, written in memory of Nelson Mandela.
- "Look at the world" for mixed chorus and piano or orchestra
- "London Town" - a choral celebration for mixed and children's choruses with piano
- The Lord bless you and keep you
- Lord, Make Me an Instrument of Thy Peace for SATB or TTBB with organ or harp and strings
- Love came down at Christmas for SATB and keyboard or strings
- Mary's Lullaby for SATB and piano or orchestra
- Nativity Carol for SATB and keyboard or strings
- O come, O come, Emmanuel from Twelve Christmas Carols, Set 1 for SATB and keyboard or orchestra
- O Lord, thou hast searched me out for SATB chorus, organ and solo cor anglais (or clarinet, or viola)
- "Psalmfest"
- Quem pastores laudavere for SATB unaccompanied
- Quittez, pasteurs for SATB unaccompanied
- Shall I compare thee to a summer's day? for SATB unaccompanied
- Shepherd's Pipe Carol for SATB and piano or orchestra or for SSAA and piano or orchestra
- Sing we to this merry company for SATB and orchestra or organ
- Star Carol for SATB or SSA and piano or orchestra or brass with optional children's choir or for unison and piano
- There is a flower (original composition) for SATB unaccompanied
- Tomorrow shall be my dancing day from the cycle of carols, Dancing Day for SSA and harp or piano
- Wexford Carol for SATB unaccompanied
- What sweeter music for SATB and organ or strings
- Winchester Te Deum For SATB and Piano or Organ

=== Anthems and other compositions ===
Most of these works are original compositions, including new musical settings of standard texts, whilst others are arrangements of traditional hymns.

- All Creatures of Our God and King
- All Things Bright and Beautiful
- As the bridegroom to his chosen
- Be Thou my vision
- The Beatles Concerto
- Behold, the Tabernacle of God
- Blow, Blow, Thou Winter Wind
- Canticle of the Heavenly City (commissioned for the dedication of John Piper's Nativity window in the church of St Mary the Virgin, Iffley)
- Children's chorus, opt.
- A Choral Amen
- A Choral Fanfare
- Christ the Lord is risen again
- A Clare Benediction
- Creation's Alleluia
- Distant Land
- The Falcon
- Fancies (part of "Eight Childhood Lyrics")
- Feel the Spirit
- For the Beauty of the Earth
- Go forth into the world in peace
- God be in my head
- God is here
- Greensleeves
- Gregorian Chant
- Heavenly Aeroplane
- How Firm A Foundation
- Hymn to the Creator of Light
- I believe in springtime
- I will lift up mine eyes
- I will sing with the spirit
- I will worship the Lord
- I Wonder as I Wander
- The King of Love my Shepherd Is
- Let us go in peace
- Look at the World
- Look to the Day
- The Lord is my light and my salvation
- The Lord is my Shepherd: SATB & organ
- This is the day the Lord hath made
- Loving shepherd of thy sheep
- Musica Dei donum
- Now thank we all our God
- O be joyful in the Lord
- O clap your hands
- O Praise the Lord of Heaven
- Open Thou Mine Eyes
- Partita
- The Peace of God
- Pie Jesu
- Praise the Lord, O my soul
- Praise ye the Lord
- A Prayer of Saint Patrick
- A St John's College Prayer (Commissioned for the College's 500th anniversary 2011)
- Thanksgiving Prayer
- The Music's Always There with You
- This is the Day (Commissioned for the Royal Wedding 2011)
- Thy Perfect love
- Toccata in 7
- To Everything There is a Season
- A Ukrainian Prayer
- When Icicles Hang
- When the Saints Go Marching In
- Wings of the Morning
- With Heart and Hands

=== Music with narration ===
- Setting of The Wind in the Willows for narrator, SATB chorus and chamber orchestra
- Brother Heinrich's Christmas
- The Reluctant Dragon

=== Piano music ===
- The John Rutter Piano Album : arrangements of eight of his most popular choral pieces for solo piano.
- The John Rutter Christmas Piano Album : eight piano arrangements of Christmas pieces composed by Rutter.
