= Christmas traditions =

Overview of the various traditions practised at Christmas

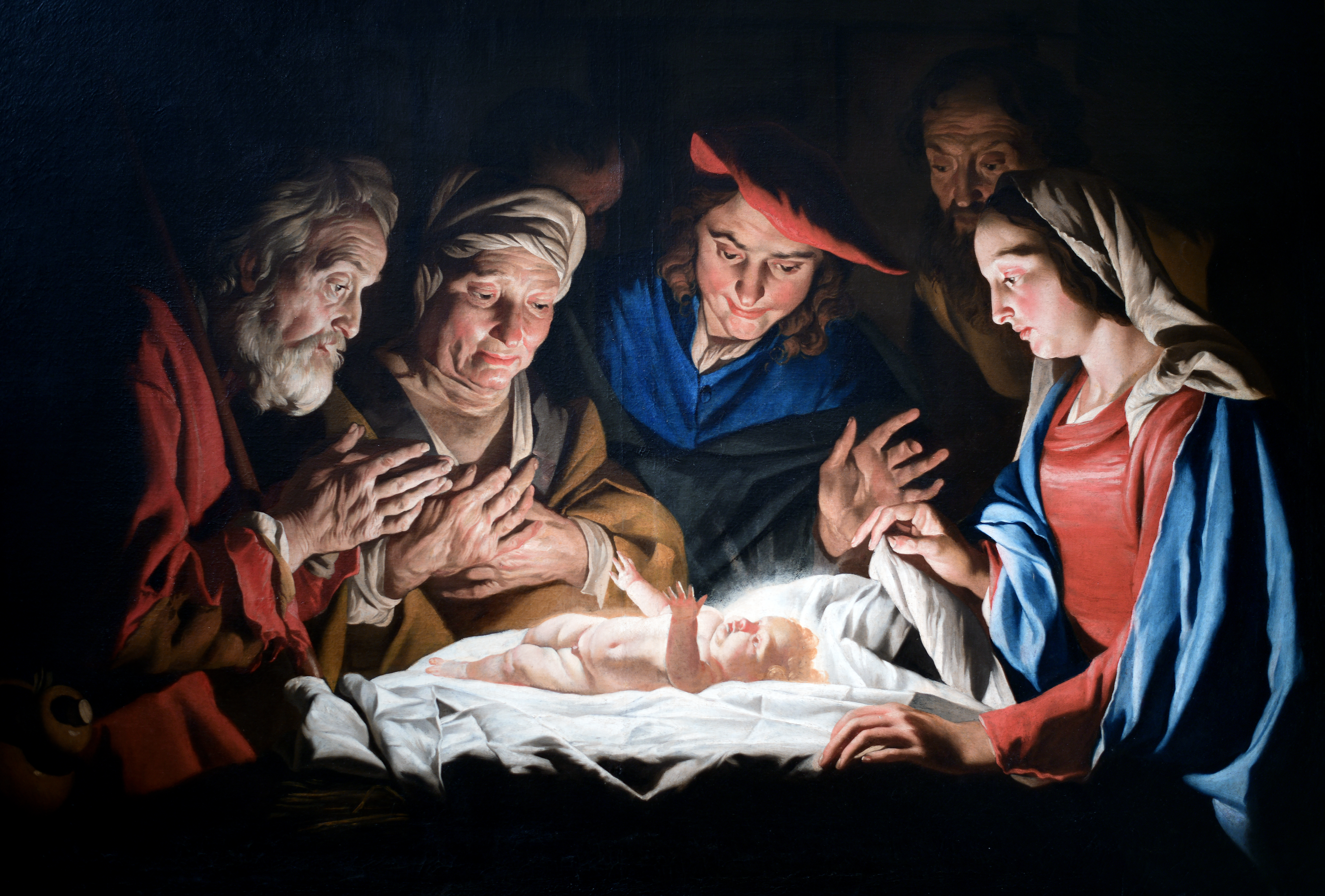
Adoration of the Shepherds by Dutch painter Matthias Stomer, 1632

Christmas traditions include a variety of customs, religious practices, rituals, and folklore associated with the celebration of Christmas. These traditions are diverse in their origins and nature, with some having an exclusively Christian character with origins from within the religion. Other traditions are considered more cultural or secular in nature and have originated outside Christian influence. Christmas traditions have also changed and evolved significantly in the centuries since the Christmas holiday was first instituted, with celebrations often taking on an entirely different quality depending on the period and geographical region.

== Church attendance ==
Christmas Day (including its vigil, Christmas Eve), is a Solemnity in the Roman Catholic Church, a Festival in the Lutheran Church, and a Principal Feast of the Anglican Communion. Other Christian denominations do not rank their feast days but place importance on Christmas Eve/Christmas Day, as with other Christian feasts like Easter, Ascension Day, and Pentecost. As such, for Christians, attending a Christmas Eve or Christmas Day church service plays an important part in celebrating the Christmas season. Christmas and Easter are the periods of highest annual church attendance. A 2010 survey by Lifeway Christian Resources found that six in ten Americans attend church services during this time. In the United Kingdom, the Church of England reported an estimated attendance of 2.5 million people at Christmas services in 2015.

== Decorations ==
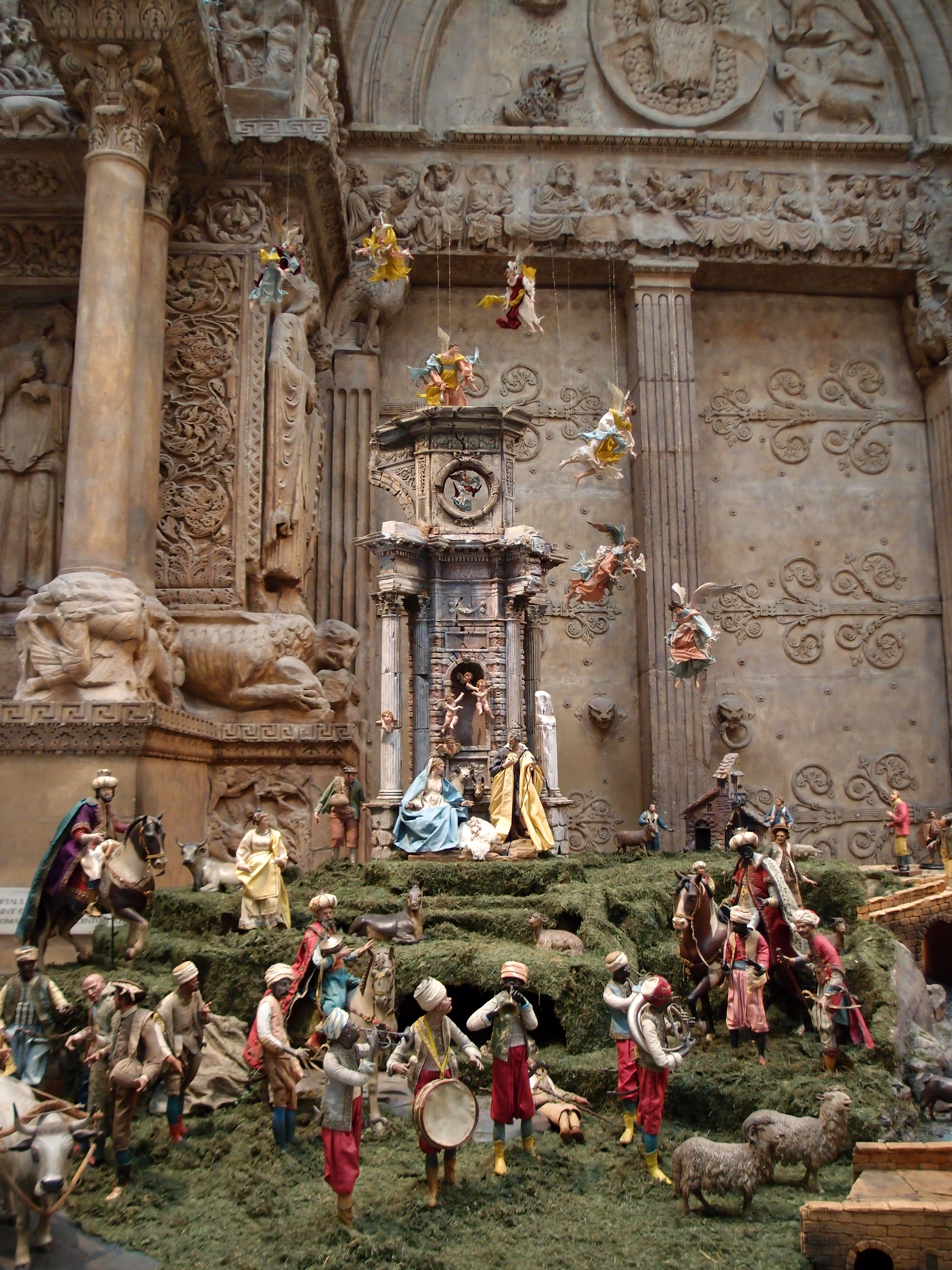
Neapolitan presepio at the Carnegie Museum of Art in Pittsburgh

The practice of putting up special decorations at Christmas has a long history. In the 15th century, it was recorded that in London, it was the custom at Christmas for every house and all the parish churches to be "decked with holm, ivy, bays, and whatsoever the season of the year afforded to be green". The heart-shaped leaves of ivy were said to symbolize Jesus coming to Earth, while holly was seen as protection against pagans and witches, its thorns and red berries held to represent the Crown of Thorns Jesus wore at the crucifixion and the blood he shed.

The tradition of the nativity scene comes from Italy. Nativity scenes date from 10th-century Rome. They were popularised by Saint Francis of Assisi from 1223, quickly spreading across Europe. Different types of nativity scenes developed across the Christian world, dependent on local tradition and available resources, and can vary from simple representations of the crib to far more elaborate sets – renowned manger scene traditions include the colourful Kraków szopka in Poland, which imitate Kraków's historical buildings as settings, the elaborate Italian presepi (Neapolitan, Genoese and Bolognese), or the Provençal crèches in southern France, using hand-painted terracotta figurines called santons. In certain parts of the world, notably Sicily, living nativity scenes following the tradition of Saint Francis are a popular alternative to static crèches. The first commercially produced decorations appeared in Germany in the 1860s, inspired by paper chains made by children. In countries where a representation of the nativity scene is prevalent, people are encouraged to compete and create the most original or realistic ones. Within some families, the pieces used to make the representation are considered a valuable family heirloom.

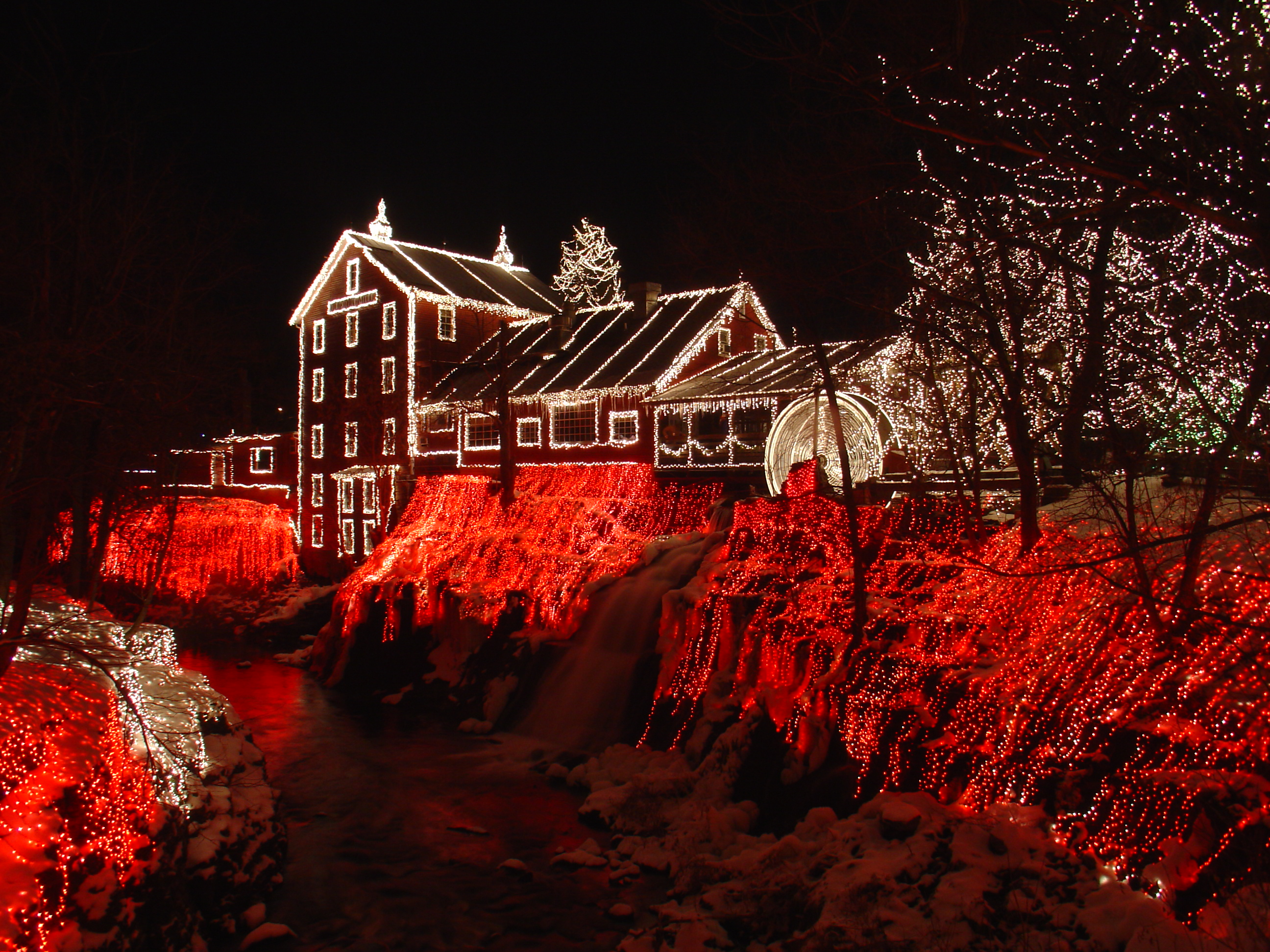
Clifton Mill in Clifton, Ohio, is the site of this Christmas display with over 3.5 million lights.

The traditional colors of Christmas decorations are red, green, and gold. Red symbolizes the blood of Jesus, which was shed in his crucifixion. Green symbolizes eternal life, particularly the evergreen tree, which does not lose its leaves in the winter. Gold is the first color associated with Christmas, as one of the three gifts of the Magi, symbolizing royalty.

The Christmas tree was first used by German Lutherans in the 16th century, with records indicating that a Christmas tree was placed in the Cathedral of Strassburg in 1539, under the leadership of the Protestant Reformer, Martin Bucer. In the United States, these "German Lutherans brought the decorated Christmas tree with them; the Moravians put lighted candles on those trees." When decorating the Christmas tree, many individuals place a star at the top of the tree symbolizing the Star of Bethlehem, a fact recorded by The School Journal in 1897. Mount Ingino Christmas Tree in Gubbio in Italy is the tallest Christmas tree in the world.

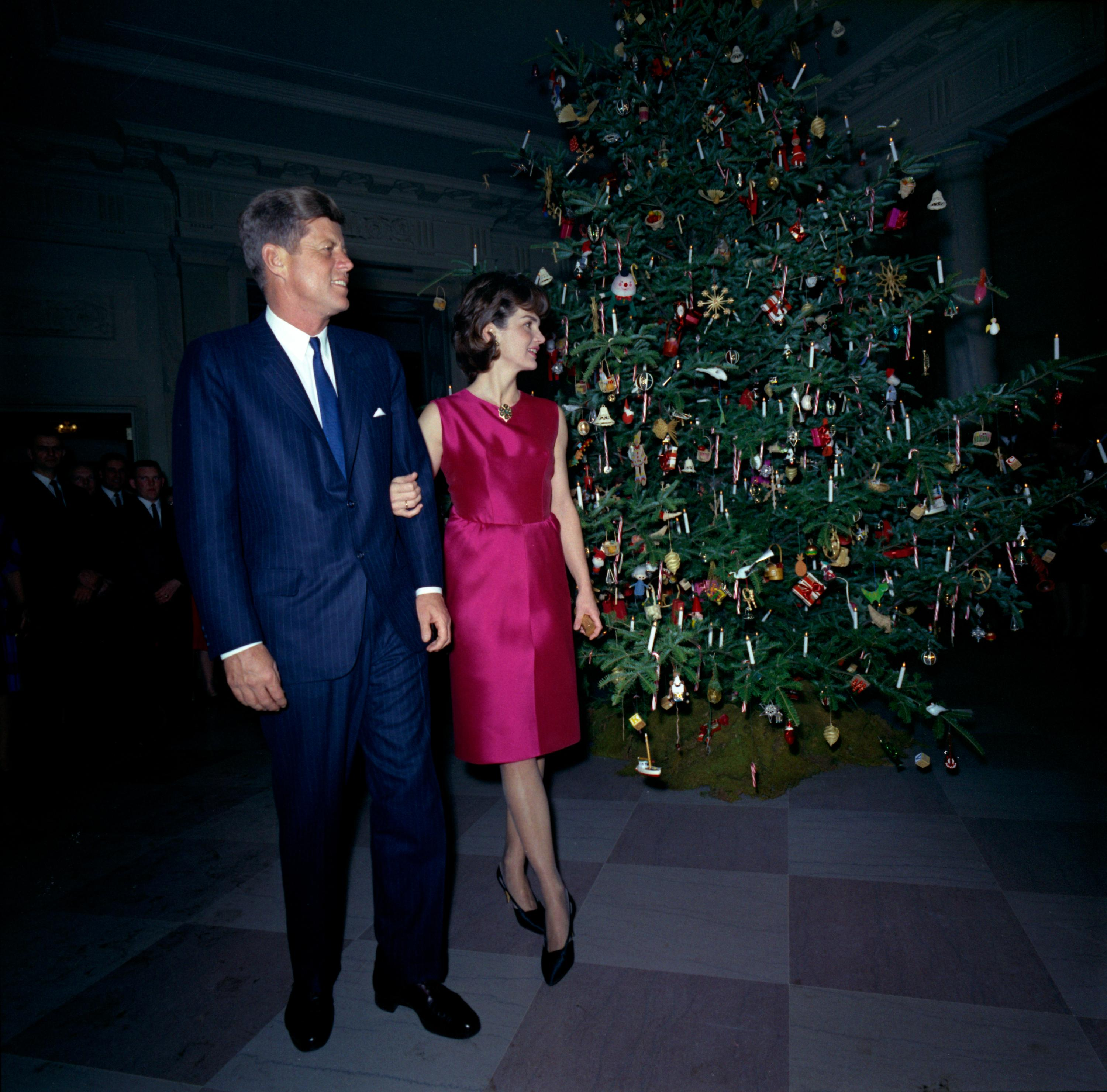
The official White House Christmas tree for 1962, displayed in the Entrance Hall and presented by John F. Kennedy and his wife Jackie

Professor David Albert Jones of Oxford University writes that in the 19th century, it became popular for people also to use an angel to top the Christmas tree to symbolize the angels mentioned in the accounts of the Nativity of Jesus. The Christmas tree is considered by some as Christianisation of pagan tradition and ritual surrounding the Winter Solstice, which included the use of evergreen boughs, and an adaptation of pagan tree worship; according to eighth-century biographer Æddi Stephanus, Saint Boniface (634–709), who was a missionary in Germany, took an axe to an oak tree dedicated to Thor and pointed out a fir tree, which he stated was a more fitting object of reverence because it pointed to heaven; it had a triangular shape, which he said was symbolic of the Trinity. The English language phrase "Christmas tree" is first recorded in 1835 and represents an importation from the German language.

From Germany, the custom was introduced to Britain, first via Queen Charlotte, wife of George III, and then more successfully by Prince Albert during the reign of Queen Victoria. By 1841, the Christmas tree had become even more widespread throughout Britain. By the 1870s, people in the United States had adopted the custom of putting up a Christmas tree. Christmas trees may be decorated with lights and ornaments.

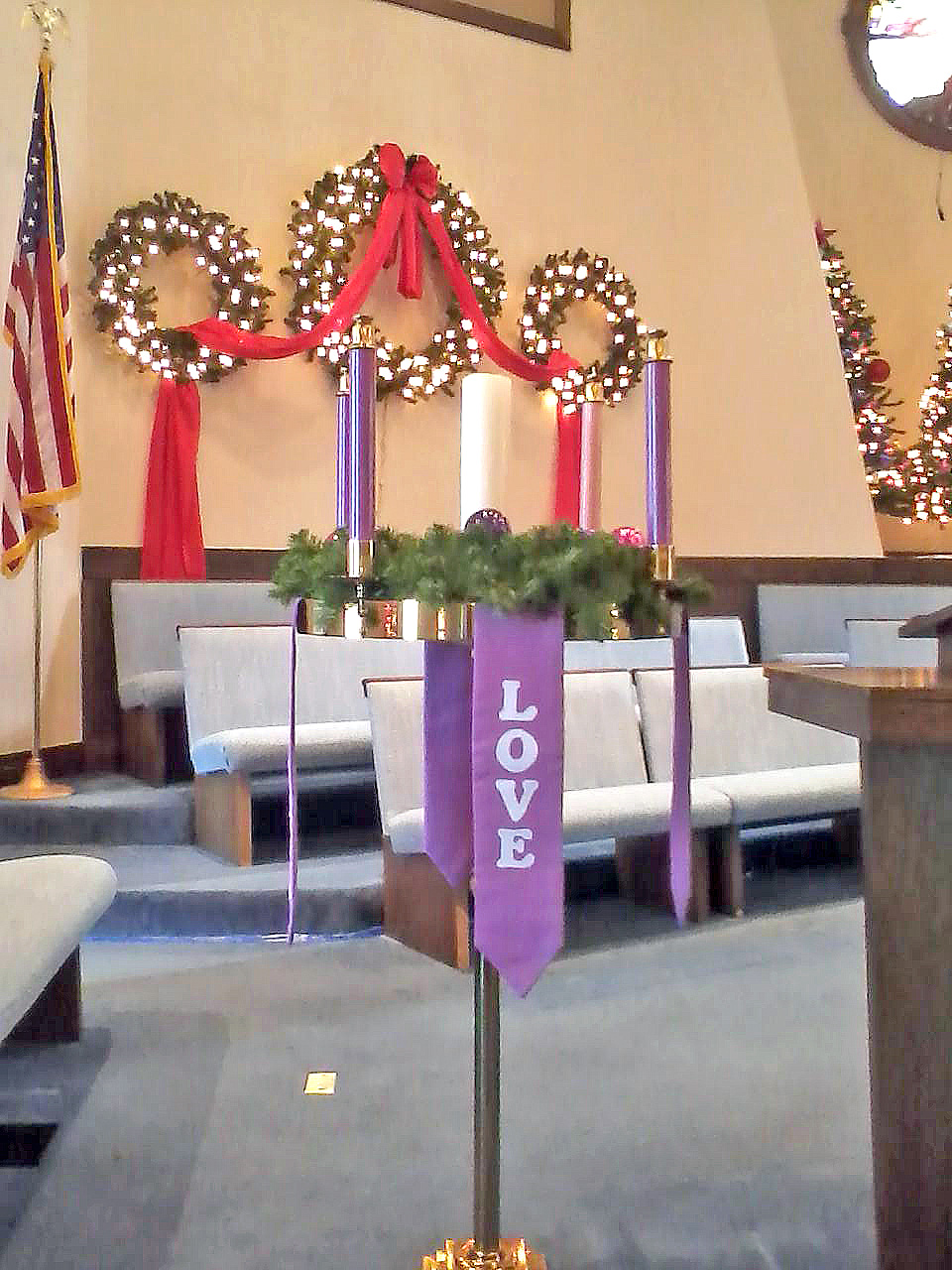
On Christmas, the Christ Candle in the center of the Advent wreath is traditionally lit in many church services.

Since the 16th century, the poinsettia, a native plant from Mexico, has been associated with Christmas carrying the Christian symbolism of the Star of Bethlehem; in that country it is known in Spanish as the Flower of the Holy Night. Other popular holiday plants include holly, mistletoe, red amaryllis, and Christmas cactus. Along with a Christmas tree, the interior of a home may be decorated with these plants, along with garlands and evergreen foliage. The display of Christmas villages has also become a tradition in many homes this season. The outside of houses may be decorated with lights and sometimes with illuminated sleighs, snowmen, and other Christmas figures. Mistletoe features prominently in European myth and folklore (for example, the legend of Baldr); it is an evergreen parasitic plant that grows on trees, especially apple and poplar, and turns golden when it is dried. It is customary to hang a sprig of mistletoe in the house at Christmas, and anyone standing underneath it may be kissed. Mistletoe has sticky white berries, one of which was traditionally removed whenever someone was kissed under it. This is probably a fertility ritual. The mistletoe berry juice resembles semen.

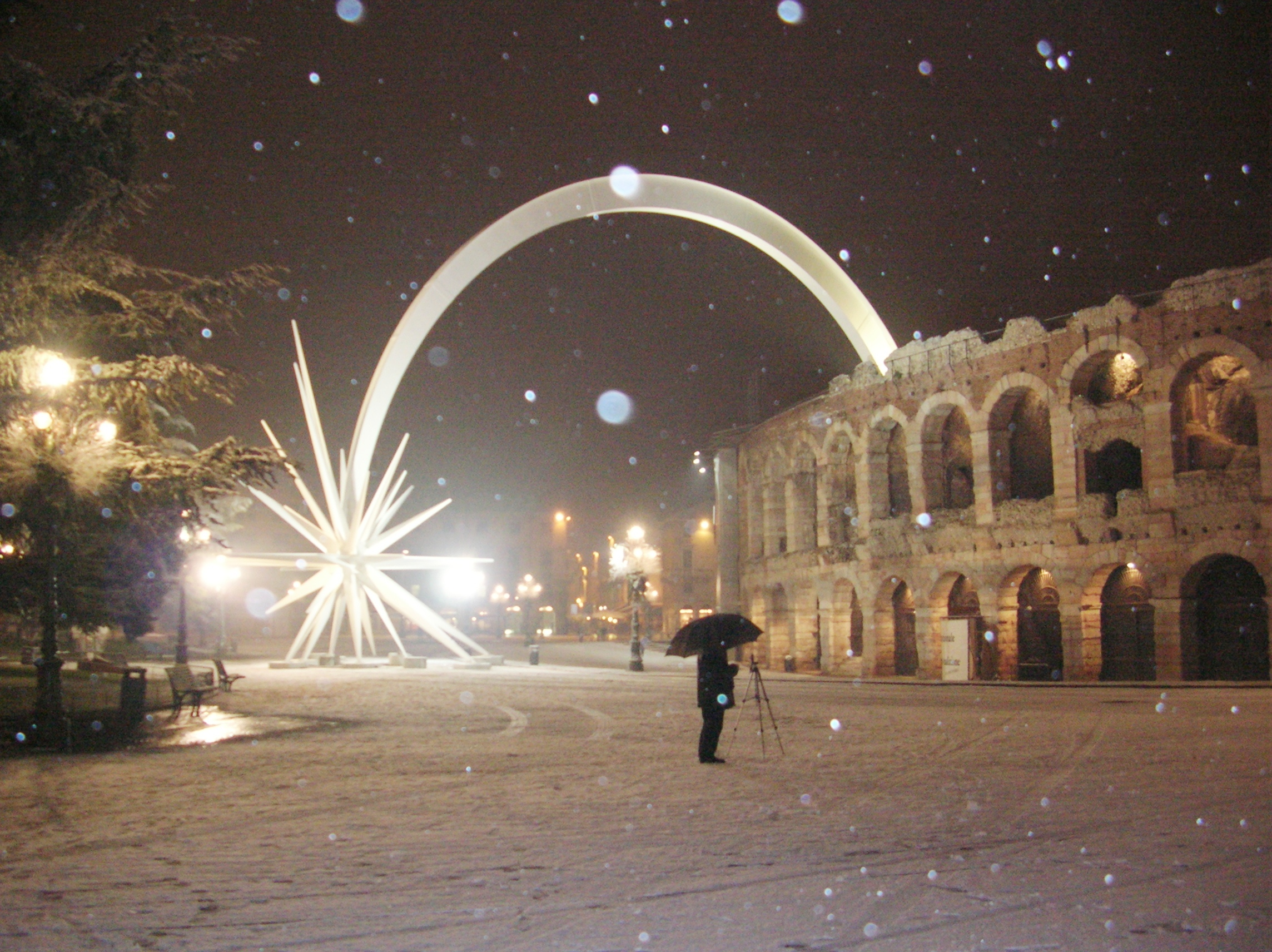
Christmas lights in Verona, Italy

Other traditional decorations include bells, candles, candy canes, stockings, wreaths, and angels. The wreaths and candles in each window are a more traditional Christmas display. The concentric assortment of leaves, usually from an evergreen, make up Christmas wreaths. Candles in each window are meant to demonstrate that Christians believe that Jesus Christ is the ultimate light of the world.

Christmas lights and banners may be hung along streets, music played by speakers, and Christmas trees placed in prominent places. It is common in many parts of the world for town squares and consumer shopping areas to sponsor and display decorations. Rolls of brightly colored paper with secular or religious Christmas motifs are manufactured to wrap gifts. In some countries, Christmas decorations are traditionally taken down on Twelfth Night.

== Nativity play ==
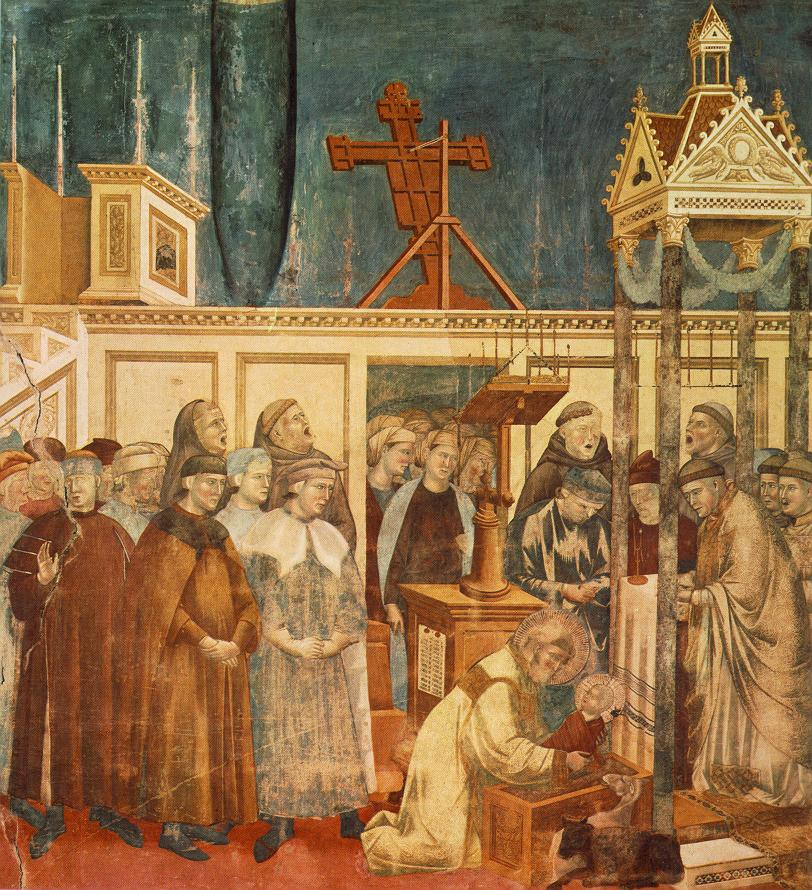
St. Francis at Greccio by Giotto, 1295

The tradition of the Nativity scene comes from Italy. One of the earliest representation in art of the nativity was found in the early Christian Roman catacomb of Saint Valentine. It dates to about AD 380. Another, of similar date, is beneath the pulpit in Sant'Ambrogio, Milan.

For the Christian celebration of Christmas, the viewing of the Nativity play is one of the oldest Christmastime traditions, with the first reenactment of the Nativity of Jesus taking place in A.D. 1223 in the Italian town of Greccio. In that year, Francis of Assisi assembled a Nativity scene outside of his church in Italy and children sang Christmas carols celebrating the birth of Jesus.

Each year, this grew larger, and people travelled from afar to see Francis' depiction of the Nativity of Jesus that came to feature drama and music. Nativity plays eventually spread throughout all of Europe, where they remain popular. Christmas Eve and Christmas Day church services often came to feature Nativity plays, as did schools and theatres. In France, Germany, Mexico, and Spain, Nativity plays are often reenacted outdoors in the streets.

== Midnight Mass ==
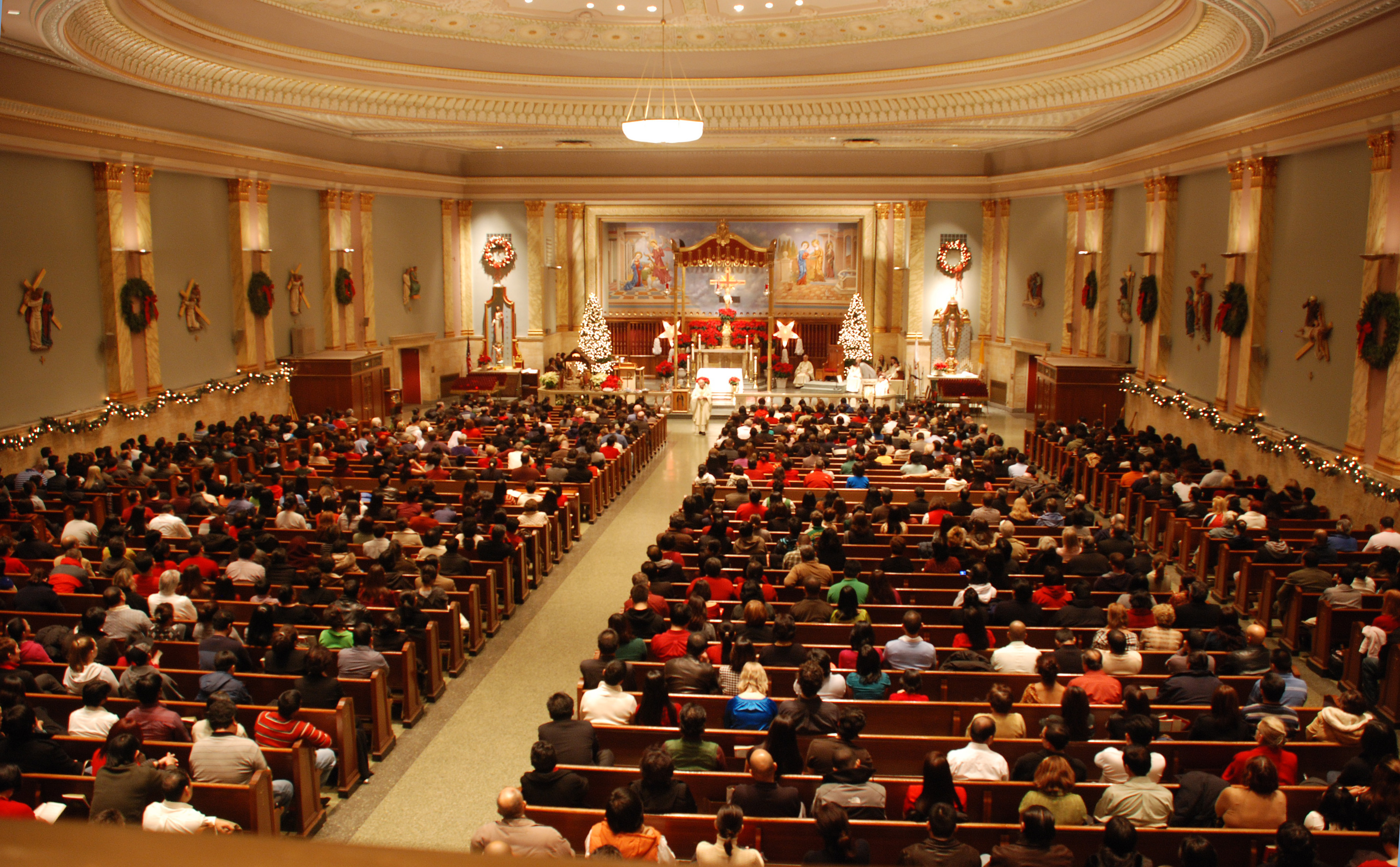
Midnight Mass at St. Sebastian Roman Catholic Church, New York City

In many Western Christian traditions, Midnight Mass is the first liturgy of Christmastide that is celebrated on the night of Christmas Eve, traditionally beginning at midnight when Christmas Eve gives way to Christmas Day. This popular Christmas custom is a jubilant celebration of the mass or service of worship in honour of the Nativity of Jesus; even many of those Christian denominations that do not regularly employ the word mass uniquely use the term "Midnight Mass" for their Christmas Eve liturgy as it includes the celebration of Holy Communion.

The tradition of a midnight Vigil on the eve of Christmas began in the East, and was observed in the late fourth century in Jerusalem by a Christian woman named Egeria on the night of January 5. The tradition reached the Western world in the year 430 under Pope Sixtus III in the Basilica of St Mary Major.

By the twelfth century, the practice of midnight Mass had become more widespread as all priests had been granted the faculty of celebrating three Masses on Christmas Day (previously reserved to the Pope), provided the three different propers were celebrated at their appropriate times of midnight, dawn and day.

== Music and carols ==
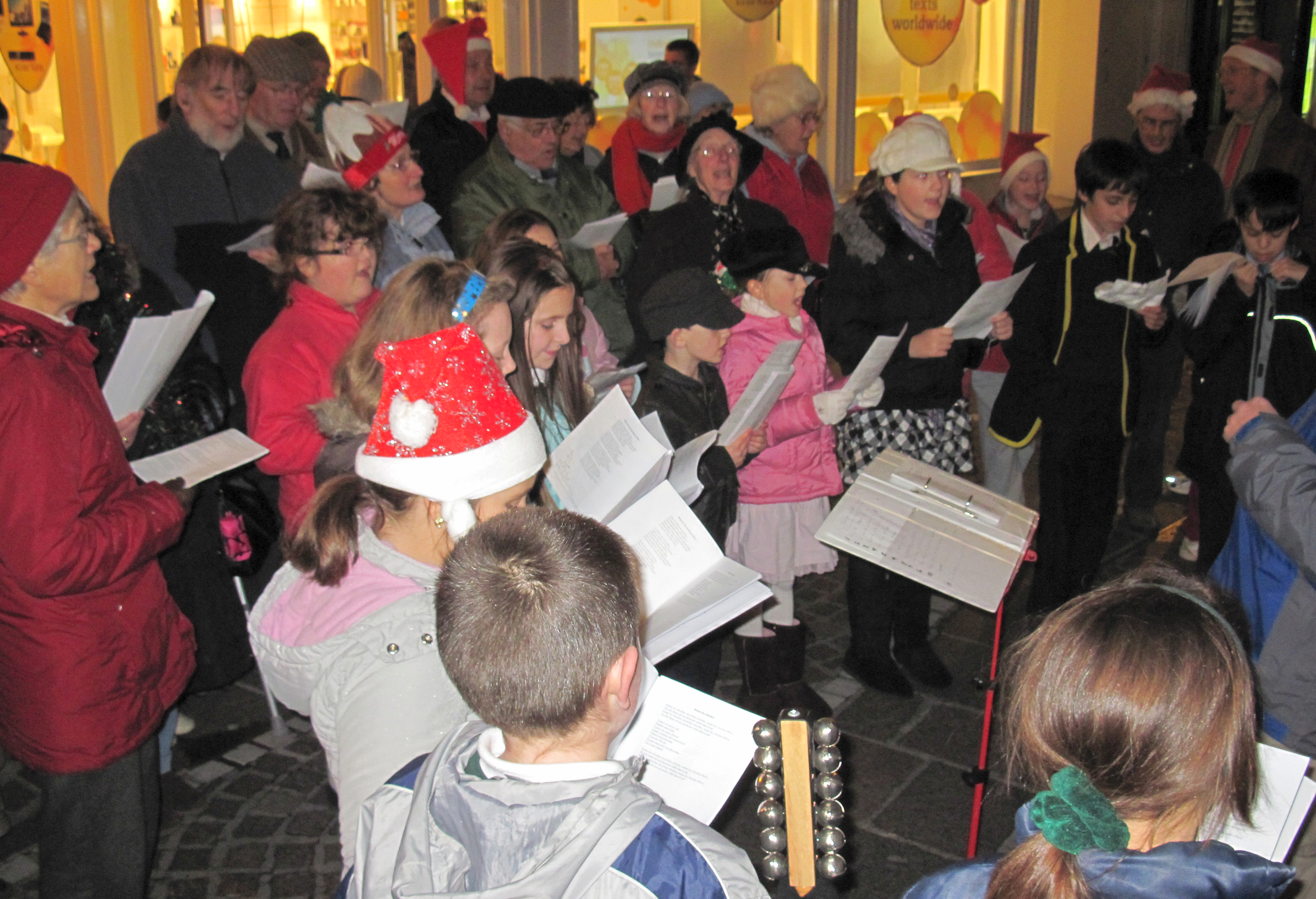
Christmas carolers in Jersey

The earliest extant Christmas hymns appeared in fourth-century Rome. Latin hymns such as "Veni redemptor gentium", written by Ambrose, Archbishop of Milan, were austere statements of the theological doctrine of the Incarnation in opposition to Arianism. "Corde natus ex Parentis" ("Of the Father's love begotten") by the Spanish poet Prudentius (d. 413) is still sung in some churches today. In the 9th and 10th centuries, the Christmas "Sequence" or "Prose" was introduced in North European monasteries, developing under Bernard of Clairvaux into a sequence of rhymed stanzas. In the 12th century, the Parisian monk Adam of St. Victor began to derive music from popular songs, introducing something closer to the traditional Christmas carol.

By the 13th century, in France, Germany, and Italy, under the influence of Francis of Assisi, a strong tradition of popular Christmas songs in the native language developed. Christmas carols in English first appear in a 1426 work of John Awdlay, a Shropshire chaplain, who lists twenty-five "caroles of Cristemas", probably sung by groups of wassailers, who went from house to house.

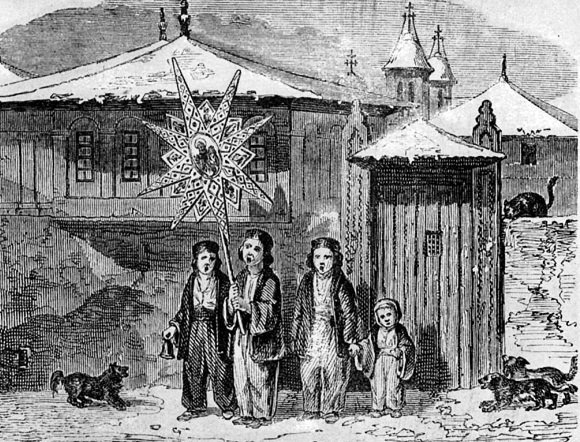
Child singers in Bucharest, 1841

The songs, now known specifically as carols, were originally communal folk songs sung during celebrations such as "harvest tide" and Christmas. It was only later that carols began to be sung in church. Traditionally, carols have often been based on medieval chord patterns, which gives them their uniquely characteristic musical sound. Some carols like "Personent hodie", "Good King Wenceslas", and "The Holly and the Ivy" can be traced directly back to the Middle Ages. They are among the oldest musical compositions still regularly sung. "Adeste Fideles" (O Come all ye faithful) appears in its current form in the mid-18th century, although the words may have originated in the 13th century.

Singing of carols initially suffered a decline in popularity after the Protestant Reformation in northern Europe, although some Reformers, like Martin Luther, wrote carols and encouraged their use in worship. Carols largely survived in rural communities until the revival of interest in popular songs in the 19th century. The 18th-century English reformer Charles Wesley understood the importance of music to worship. In addition to setting many psalms to melodies, which were influential in the Great Awakening in the United States, he wrote texts for at least three Christmas carols. The best known was originally entitled "Hark! How All the Welkin Rings", later renamed "Hark! The Herald Angels Sing".

Hark! The Herald Angels Sing
Performed by the U.S. Army Band Chorus

Felix Mendelssohn wrote a melody adapted to fit Wesley's words. In Austria in 1818, Mohr and Gruber made a significant addition to the genre when they composed "Silent Night" for the Nikolauskirche in Oberndorf. William Sandys' Christmas Carols Ancient and Modern (1833) contained the first appearance in print of many now-classic English carols and contributed to the mid-Victorian revival of the festival.

Completely secular Christmas seasonal songs emerged in the late 18th century. "Deck the Halls" dates from 1784, and the American "Jingle Bells" was copyrighted in 1857. In the 19th and 20th centuries, African-American spirituals and songs about Christmas, based on the tradition of spirituals, became more widely known. An increasing number of seasonal holiday songs were commercially produced in the 20th century, including jazz and blues variations. In addition, there was a revival of interest in early music, from groups singing folk music, such as The Revels, to performers of early medieval and classical music. John Rutter has composed many carols including "All Bells in Paradise", "Angels' Carol", "Candlelight Carol", "Donkey Carol", "Jesus Child", "Shepherd's Pipe Carol" and "Star Carol".

== Traditional cuisine ==
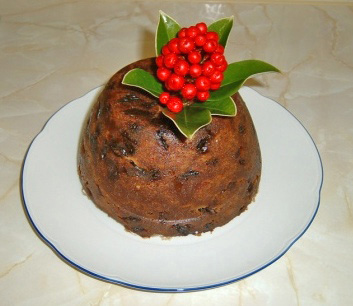
Christmas pudding cooked on Stir-up Sunday, the Sunday before the beginning of the Advent season

A special Christmas family meal is traditionally an important part of the holiday's celebration, and the food served varies greatly from country to country. Some regions have special meals for Christmas Eve, such as Sicily, where 12 kinds of fish are served. In the United Kingdom and countries influenced by its traditions, a standard Christmas meal includes a turkey, goose or other large bird, gravy, potatoes, vegetables, sometimes bread, and cider. Special desserts are also prepared, such as Christmas pudding, mince pies, fruit cake and Yule log cake.

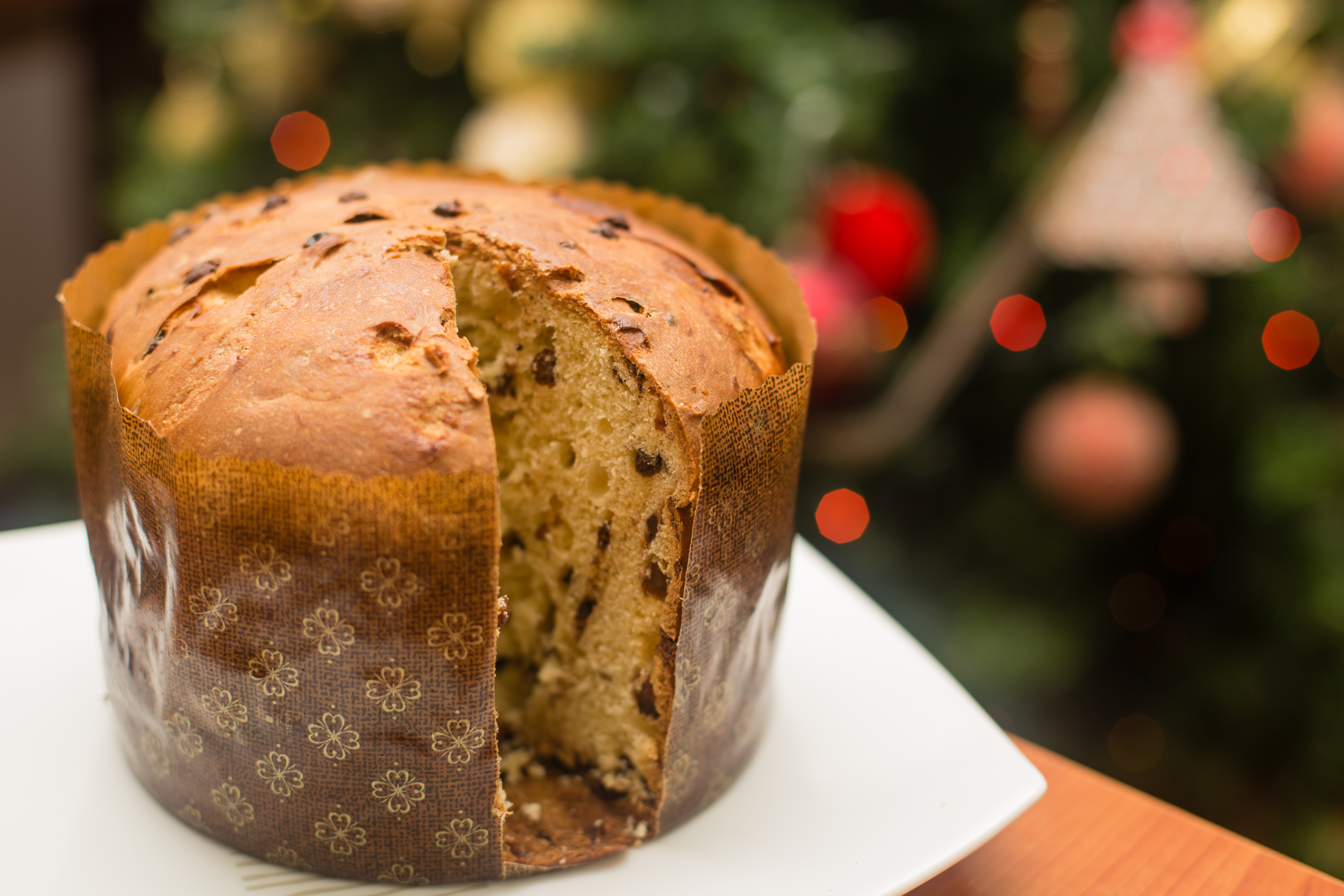
Panettone

In Poland, other parts of Eastern Europe, and Scandinavia, fish is often used for the traditional main course, but richer meat such as lamb is increasingly served. In Sweden, it is common with a special variety of smörgåsbord, where ham, meatballs, and herring play a prominent role. In Germany, France, and Austria, goose and pork are favored. Beef, ham, and chicken in various recipes are popular worldwide. In Japan, the holiday can be celebrated with the consumption of fried chicken. The Maltese traditionally serve Imbuljuta tal-Qastan, a chocolate and chestnuts beverage, after Midnight Mass and throughout the Christmas season. Slovenes prepare the traditional Christmas bread potica, bûche de Noël in France, panettone in Italy, and elaborate tarts and cakes. Panettone, an Italian type of sweet bread and fruitcake, originally from Milan, Italy, is usually prepared and enjoyed for Christmas and New Year in Western, Southern, and Southeastern Europe, as well as in South America, Eritrea, Australia, the United States, New Zealand, and Canada.

The eating of sweets and chocolates has become popular worldwide, and sweeter Christmas delicacies include the German stollen, marzipan cake or candy, and Jamaican rum fruit cake. As one of the few fruits traditionally available to northern countries in winter, oranges have been long associated with special Christmas foods. Eggnog is a sweetened dairy-based beverage traditionally made with milk, cream, sugar, and whipped eggs (which gives it a frothy texture). Spirits such as brandy, rum, or bourbon are often added. The finished serving is often garnished with a sprinkling of ground cinnamon or nutmeg.

== Cards ==
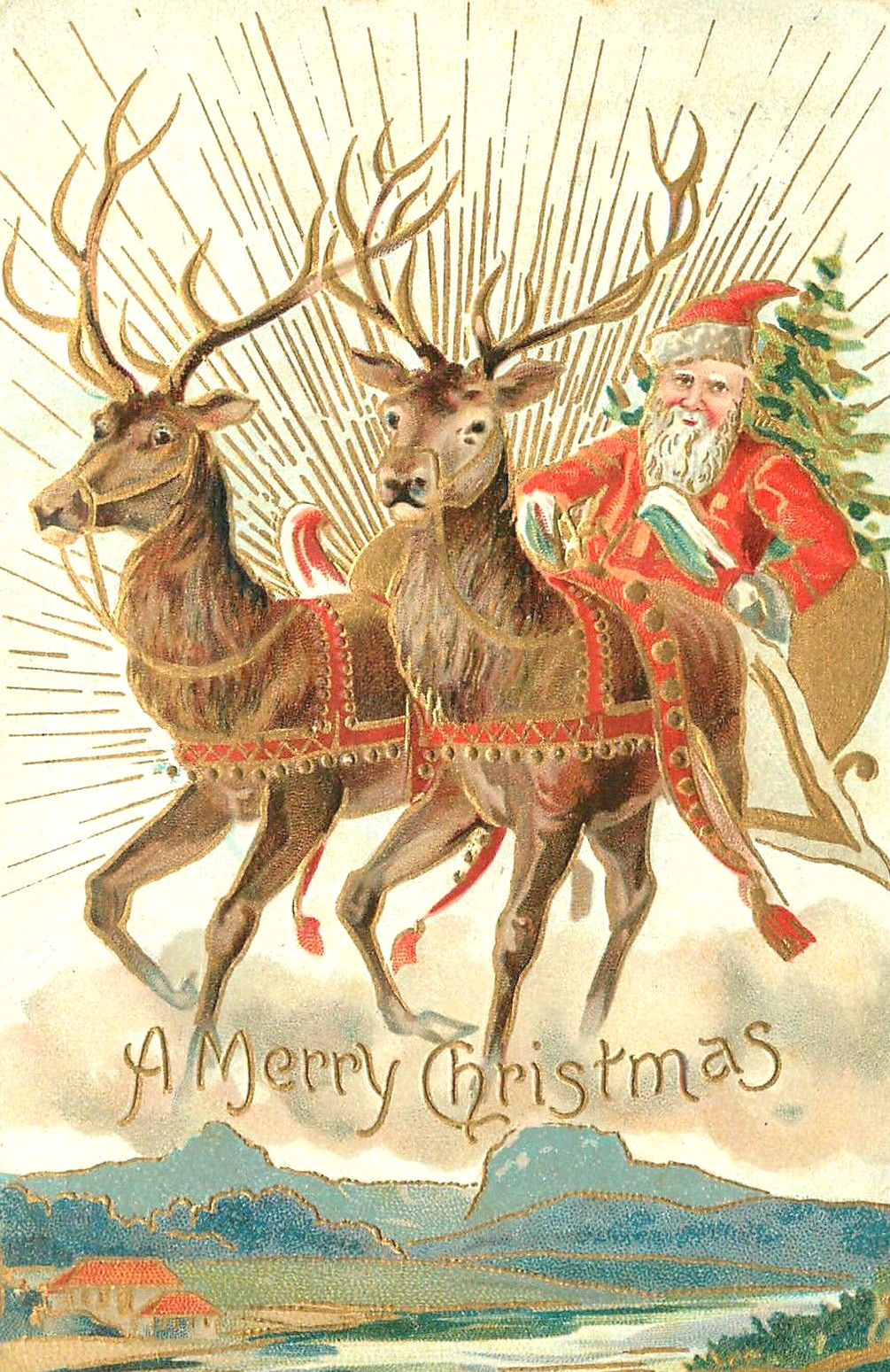
A 1907 Christmas card with Santa and some of his reindeer

Christmas cards are illustrated messages of greeting exchanged between friends and family members during the weeks preceding Christmas Day. The traditional greeting reads "wishing you a Merry Christmas and a Happy New Year", much like that of the first commercial Christmas card, produced by Sir Henry Cole in London in 1843.

Christmas cards are purchased in considerable quantities and feature commercially designed artwork relevant to the season. The content of the design might relate directly to the Christmas narrative, with depictions of the Nativity of Jesus, or Christian symbols such as the Star of Bethlehem, or a white dove, which can represent both the Holy Spirit and Peace on Earth. Other Christmas cards are more secular and can depict Christmas traditions, mythical figures such as Santa Claus, objects directly associated with Christmas such as candles, holly and baubles, or a variety of images related to the season, such as Christmastide activities, snow scenes and the wildlife of the northern winter. Some humorous cards and genres depict nostalgic past scenes such as crinolined shoppers in idealized 19th-century streetscapes.

Some prefer cards with a poem, prayer, or Biblical verse, while others distance themselves from religion with an all-inclusive "Season's greetings".

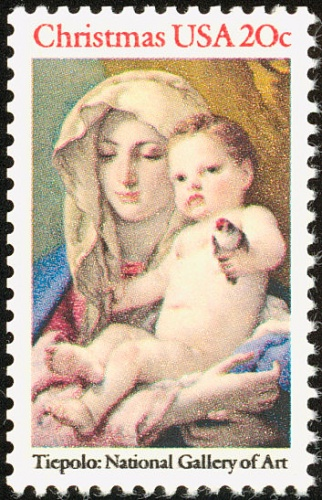
Christmas stamp released in the United States in 1982, featuring a painting by Giovanni Battista Tiepolo

== Commemorative stamps ==
Several nations have issued commemorative stamps at Christmastide. Postal customers will often use these stamps to mail Christmas cards, and they are popular with philatelists. These stamps are regular postage stamps, unlike Christmas seals, and are valid for postage year-round. They usually go on sale between early October and early December and are printed in considerable quantities.

== Gift giving ==
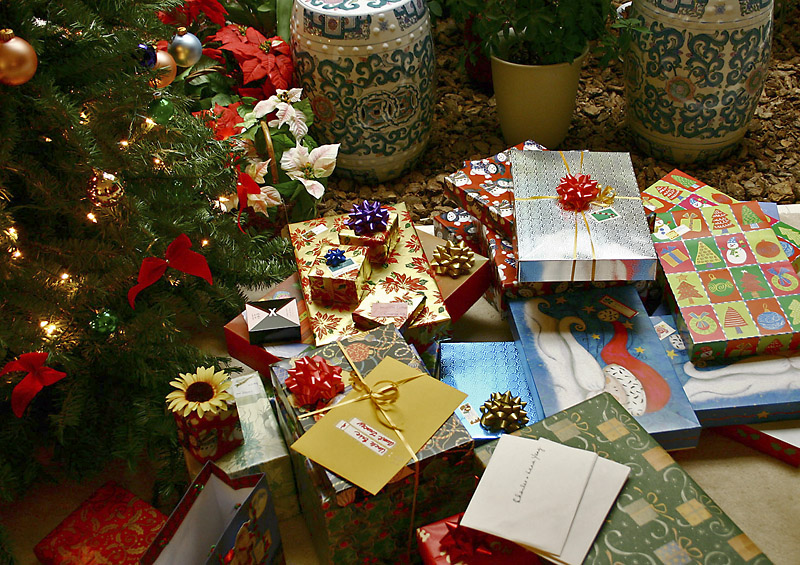
Christmas gifts under a Christmas tree

The exchanging of gifts is one of the core aspects of the modern Christmas celebration, making it the most profitable time of year for retailers and businesses throughout the world. On Christmas, people exchange gifts based on the Christian tradition associated with Saint Nicholas, and the gifts of gold, frankincense, and myrrh which were given to the baby Jesus by the Magi. The tradition of gift giving in the Roman celebration of Saturnalia may have influenced Christian Christmas customs. Still, on the other hand, the Christian "core dogma of the Incarnation, however, solidly established the giving and receiving of gifts as the structural principle of that recurrent yet unique event" because it was the Biblical Magi, "together with all their fellow men, who received the gift of God through man's renewed participation in the divine life."

=== Gift-bearing figures ===
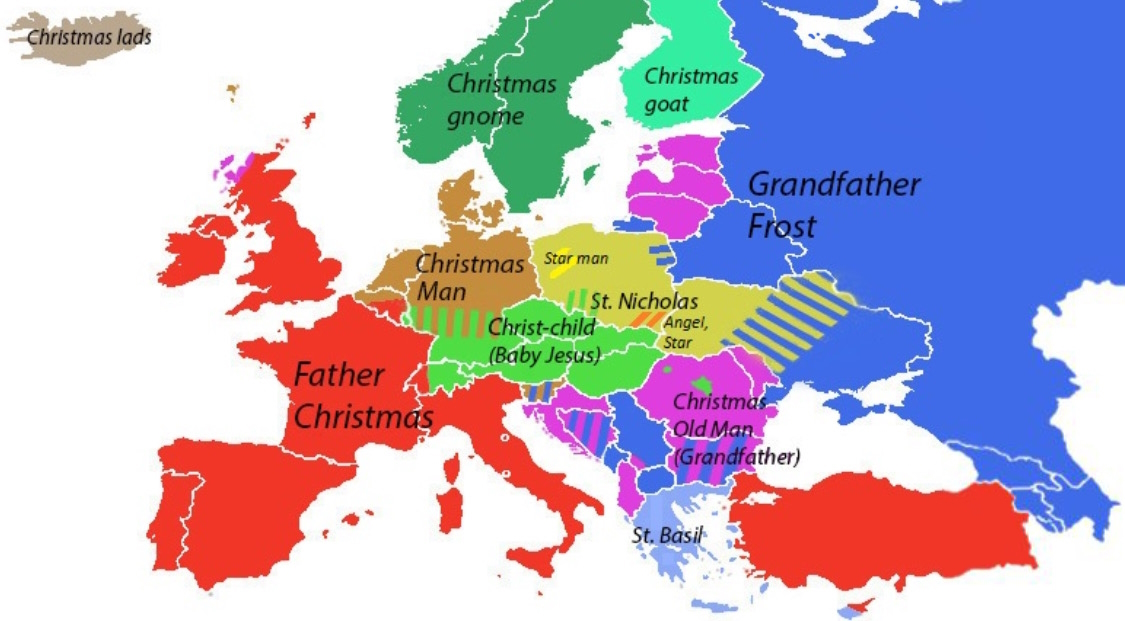
Christmas gift-bringers in Europe

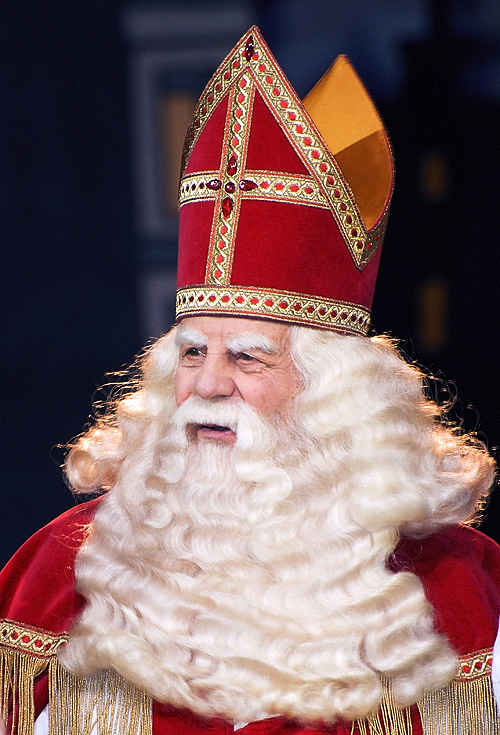
Saint Nicholas, known as Sinterklaas in the Netherlands, is considered by many to be the original Santa Claus.

Many figures are associated with Christmas and seasonal gift-giving. Among these are Father Christmas, also known as Santa Claus (derived from the Dutch for Saint Nicholas), Père Noël, and the Weihnachtsmann; Saint Nicholas or Sinterklaas; the Christkind; Kris Kringle; Joulupukki; tomte/nisse; Babbo Natale; Saint Basil; Svatý Mikuláš; and Ded Moroz. The Scandinavian tomte (also called nisse) is sometimes depicted as a gnome instead of Santa Claus.

The best-known of these figures today is red-dressed Santa Claus, of diverse origins. The name Santa Claus can be traced back to the Dutch Sinterklaas, which means Saint Nicholas. Nicholas was a 4th-century Greek bishop of Myra, a city in the Roman province of Lycia, whose ruins are 3 kilometres (1.9 mi) from modern Demre in southwest Turkey. Among other saintly attributes, he was noted for the care of children, generosity, and giving gifts. His feast day, December 6, came to be celebrated in many countries with the giving of gifts.

Saint Nicholas traditionally appeared in bishop's attire, accompanied by helpers, inquiring about children's behavior during the past year before deciding whether they deserved a gift. By the 13th century, Saint Nicholas was well known in the Netherlands, and the practice of gift-giving in his name spread to other parts of central and southern Europe. During the Reformation in 16th–17th-century Europe, many Protestants changed the gift bringer to the Christ Child or Christkindl, corrupted in English to Kris Kringle, and the date of giving gifts changed from December 6 to Christmas Eve.

However, the modern popular image of Santa Claus was created in the United States, particularly in New York. The transformation was accomplished with the aid of notable contributors, including Washington Irving and the German-American cartoonist Thomas Nast (1840–1902). Following the American Revolutionary War, some of the inhabitants of New York City sought out symbols of the city's non-English past. New York had originally been established as the Dutch colonial town of New Amsterdam, and the Dutch Sinterklaas tradition was reinvented as Saint Nicholas.

In 1809, the New-York Historical Society convened and retroactively named Sancte Claus the patron saint of Nieuw Amsterdam, the Dutch name for New York City. At his first American appearance in 1810, Santa Claus was drawn in bishops' robes. However, as new artists took over, Santa Claus developed more secular attire. Nast drew a new image of "Santa Claus" annually, beginning in 1863. By the 1880s, Nast's Santa had evolved into the modern vision of the figure, perhaps based on the English figure of Father Christmas. The image was standardized by advertisers in the 1920s and continues through the present day.

Some oppose the narrative of the American evolution of Saint Nicholas into the modern Santa. People claim that the Saint Nicholas Society was not founded until 1835, almost half a century after the end of the American War of Independence. Moreover, a study of the "children's books, periodicals and journals" of New Amsterdam by Charles Jones revealed no references to Saint Nicholas or Sinterklaas. However, not all scholars agree with Jones's findings, which he reiterated in a book-length study in 1978; Howard G. Hageman, of New Brunswick Theological Seminary, maintains that the tradition of celebrating Sinterklaas in New York was alive and well from the early settlement of the Hudson Valley on.

Father Christmas, a jolly, stout, bearded man who typified the spirit of good cheer at Christmas, predates the Santa Claus character. He was first recorded in early 17th century England but was associated with holiday merrymaking and drunkenness rather than bringing gifts. In Victorian Britain, his image was remade to match that of Santa. The French Père Noël evolved along similar lines, eventually adopting the Santa image. In Italy, Babbo Natale acts as Santa Claus, while La Befana is the bringer of gifts and arrives on the eve of the Epiphany. It is said that La Befana set out to bring the baby Jesus gifts but got lost along the way. Now, she brings gifts to all children. In some cultures, Santa Claus is accompanied by Knecht Ruprecht or Black Peter. In other versions, elves make the toys. His wife is referred to as Mrs. Claus.

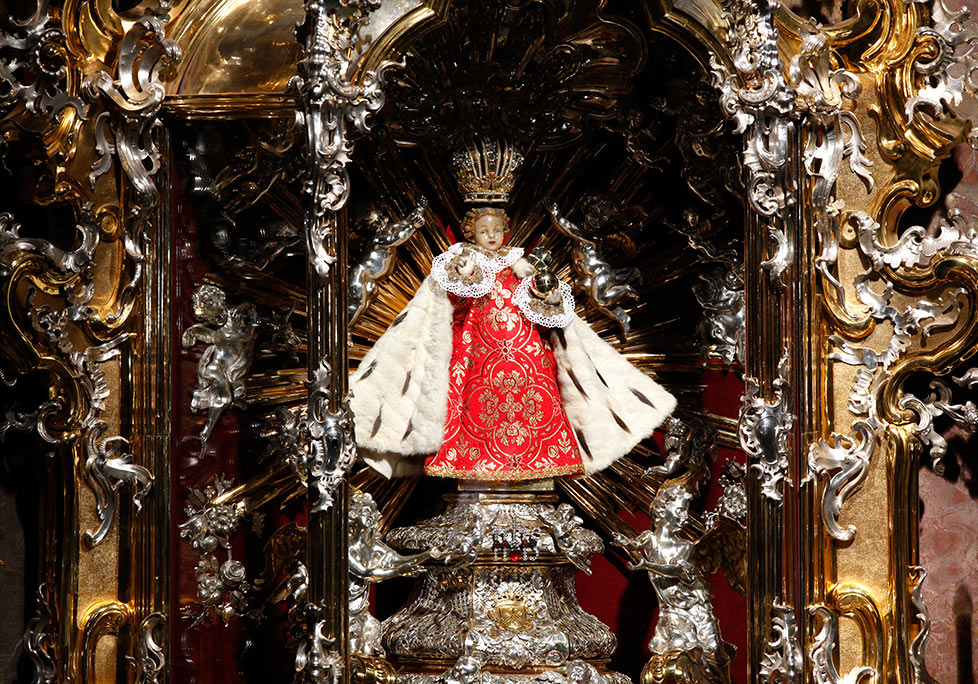
The famous statue of the Infant Jesus of Prague, given by Princess Polyxena of Lobkowicz to the Discalced Carmelites in 1628

The Christ Child, also known as Divine Infant, Baby Jesus, Infant Jesus, the Divine Child, Child Jesus and the Holy Child, refers to Jesus Christ from his nativity until age 12. The four canonical gospels, accepted by most Christians today, lack any narration of the years between Jesus' infancy and the Finding in the Temple when he was 12. In Italy, until the 20th century, before the tradition of writing to Santa Claus spread throughout the country, it was customary in many families for children to write letters addressed to the Christ Child, expressing good intentions for the new year and giving requests for gifts for Christmas Day.

Current tradition in several Latin American countries (such as Venezuela and Colombia) holds that while Santa makes the toys, he then gives them to Baby Jesus, who is the one who delivers them to the children's homes, a reconciliation between traditional religious beliefs and the iconography of Santa Claus imported from the United States.

In South Tyrol (Italy), Austria, Czech Republic, Southern Germany, Hungary, Liechtenstein, Slovakia, and Switzerland, the Christkind (Ježíšek in Czech, Jézuska in Hungarian and Ježiško in Slovak) brings the presents. Greek children get their presents from Saint Basil on New Year's Eve, the eve of that saint's liturgical feast. The German St. Nikolaus is not identical with the Weihnachtsmann (who is the German version of Santa Claus / Father Christmas). St. Nikolaus wears a bishop's dress and still brings small gifts (usually candies, nuts, and fruits) on December 6 and is accompanied by Knecht Ruprecht. Although many parents worldwide routinely teach their children about Santa Claus and other gift bringers, some reject this practice, considering it deceptive.

Multiple gift-giver figures exist in Poland, varying between regions and individual families. St Nicholas (Święty Mikołaj) dominates Central and North-East areas, the Starman (Gwiazdor) is most common in Greater Poland, Baby Jesus (Dzieciątko) is unique to Upper Silesia, with the Little Star (Gwiazdka) and the Little Angel (Aniołek) being typical in the South and the South-East. Grandfather Frost (Dziadek Mróz) is less commonly accepted in some areas of Eastern Poland. It is worth noting that across all of Poland, St Nicholas is the gift giver on Saint Nicholas Day on December 6.

In Spain and some countries in Latin America, the Three Wise Men bring gifts to children on January 6 (Epiphany) in honor of the Biblical Magi who visited Jesus after his birth, bearing gifts of gold, frankincense, and myrrh in homage to him.
