= A Clare Benediction =

- Anthem by John Rutter
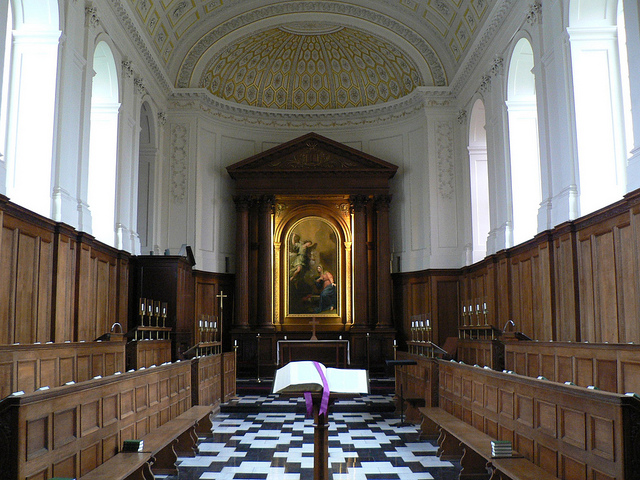
- Chapel of Clare College
- Published: 1998
- Scoring: SATB choir and organ or orchestra

A Clare Benediction is an anthem by John Rutter, beginning May the Lord show his mercy upon you. Rutter wrote both the text and music of the composition to honour Clare College, Cambridge, where he had studied. The work was published by Oxford University Press in 1998.

== History, text and music ==
Rutter, who has had a long association with Clare College, Cambridge, having read music there in the 1960s and then returning as director of the chapel choir from 1975 to 1979, composed the anthem in 1998 in honour of his Alma mater, setting his own words. It is one of several choral benedictions, always for persons or institutions with special significance to the composer. Rutter's text, beginning "May the Lord show his mercy upon you", is a prayer for protection and guidance, when sleeping or awake, in life and after. The beginning is sung by the high voices, followed answered by lines sung by the low voices, alternating. The harmony is in tonality, with chromaticism used to intensify the words "May his spirit be ever by your side", sung by all voices.

A Clare Benediction was published by Oxford University Press in 1998, in versions for different voices and keyboard or orchestra. It was included in an ecumenical collection of sacred music for occasions, Musik für Kasualien, by Carus-Verlag. With a German translation, it appears in the first and general section of volume 5, music for choir and organ.

== Recordings ==
A Clare Benediction was recorded in 2002, together with Rutter's Requiem, other anthems and organ music, by the Choir of Clare College, with organist Nicholas Rimmer and conducted by Timothy Brown. It appears on a 2003 collection of Rutter's sacred music including the Mass of the Children, performed by the Cambridge Singers and the City of London Sinfonia, conducted by the composer.

In June 2020, a performance entitled A Virtual Clare Benediction, made up of individual performances by over 200 alumni of Clare College, was released on YouTube to commemorate the 2020 Graduation Ceremony which was postponed due to lockdown restrictions. A Clare Benediction was later performed by the Choir of Clare College for these graduands during their graduation chapel service in April 2022.
