= A Gaelic Blessing =

1978 choral composition by John Rutter

- by John Rutter
- Language: English
- Published: 1978: Hinshaw
- Scoring: SATB choir and organ

A Gaelic Blessing is an English language choral composition by John Rutter, consisting of four vocal parts (SATB) and organ or orchestra. It is also known by the repeating first line of the text, "Deep peace". The work was commissioned by the Chancel Choir of First United Methodist Church, Omaha, Nebraska, for their conductor Mel Olson. It was published first in 1978 by Hinshaw Music, by Oxford University Press and by the Royal School of Church Music.

== History, text and music ==
The piece was commissioned by the Chancel Choir of First United Methodist Church in Omaha, Nebraska, for their conductor Mel Olson in 1978.

The format of the text is based in a similar format to that found in some Celtic Christian prayers and songs, such as those found in the Christian-era Scottish Gaelic collection, the Carmina Gadelica. Rutter has said that his English-only composition is based on "an old Gaelic rune", and that he added a line mentioning Jesus and the word Amen, to make it also a Christian anthem. However, most surviving prayers with this structure, in both Gaelic and English, already include Christian elements. The original, English-language piece that the central lines of Rutter's piece are directly excerpted from is a poem in the book The Dominion of Dreams: Under the Dark Star, by Celtic Revival writer William Sharp / Fiona Macleod; while not containing the words "Jesus," or "Amen," the poem does mention both "the Son of Peace" and "the heart of Mary," along with other Christian imagery.

Both Sharp's and Rutter's compositions begin every line with "deep peace", and refer in a repetitive manner to the elements of nature, such as, "running wave", "flowing air", "quiet earth", "shining stars", "gentle night", "healing light", and (in Rutter's version) to "Christ, light of the world". The almost-identical nature of the two pieces, along with Rutter's comments on his additions, mark Sharp's 1895 English-language composition as the original.

Rutter scored the piece for four vocal parts (SATB) and organ, or orchestra. Marked "Flowing and tranquil", the music is in E major and 3/4 time. The organ accompaniment rests on a pattern of chords held often for a full measure in the left hand, and broken chords in eighth-notes in the right hand. The choir voices enter together, with the lower voices also moving slowly like the left hand (a full measure for "Deep", another one for "peace"), while the soprano pronounces "peace" sooner and moves up in eighth-notes on "running wave". The pattern is kept for most of the piece. Dynamically, the music begins softly (p), growing slightly (to mp) for the "shining stars", and again later for "moon and stars". A climax is "Christ", marked crescendo to a strong (f) "light of the world" (with all voices holding the word "light" for more than a measure), but diminuendo to a very soft ending, with all voices and the accompaniment calming to slow movement.

== The original poem ==
In the book, the following poem was spoken by one of the characters:

Deep peace I breathe into you,
O weariness, here:
O ache, here!
Deep peace, a soft white dove to you;
Deep peace, a quiet rain to you;
Deep peace, an ebbing wave to you!
Deep peace, red wind of the east from you;
Deep peace, grey wind of the west to you;
Deep peace, dark wind of the north from you;
Deep peace, blue wind of the south to you!
Deep peace, pure red of the flame to you;
Deep peace, pure white of the moon to you;
Deep peace, pure green of the grass to you;
Deep peace, pure brown of the earth to you;
Deep peace, pure grey of the dew to you,
Deep peace, pure blue of the sky to you!
Deep peace of the running wave to you,
Deep peace of the flowing air to you,
Deep peace of the quiet earth to you,
Deep peace of the sleeping stones to you
Deep peace of the Yellow Shepherd to you,
Deep peace of the Wandering Shepherdess to you,
Deep peace of the Flock of Stars to you,
Deep peace from the Son of Peace to you,
Deep peace from the heart of Mary to you,
And from Bridget of the Mantle
Deep peace, deep peace!
And with the kindness too of the Haughty Father
Peace!
In the name of the Three who are One,
Peace!
And by the will of the King of the Elements,
Peace! Peace!

== Performances and recordings ==
The composition is characterized as slow-paced and of a gentle nature. It was published first in 1987 by Hinshaw Music, but then, like other music by John Rutter, by Oxford University Press (also in versions with harp or with string orchestra) and by the Royal School of Church Music. It has been recorded in collections of Rutter's choral works performed under his direction by the Cambridge Singers and the City of London Sinfonia. Together with the composer's Requiem, it was recorded in 2010 by the choir Polyphony and the Bournemouth Sinfonietta, conducted by Stephen Layton.
