= The Peace of God =

- by John Rutter
- Language: English
- Published: 1993
- Scoring: SATB or SsA choir and organ

The Peace of God is an English language choral composition by John Rutter for voices and organ or strings, a setting of a text from the Book of Common Prayer.

== History, text and music ==
Rutter composed The Peace of God setting a text comes from the 1662 Book of Common Prayer which is based on a verse from the Letter to the Philippians, 4:7.

Rutter wrote versions for four (SATB) or three voices (SSA), accompanied by organ or strings. Marked "Calmo" (calmly), the music is in F major and 3/4 time.

The music was published in 1993. It has been recorded in collections of Rutter's choral works performed under his direction by the Cambridge Singers and the City of London Sinfonia, such as O Praise the Lord of Heaven.
