= Magnificat (Rutter) =

Musical composition by John Rutter

- by John Rutter
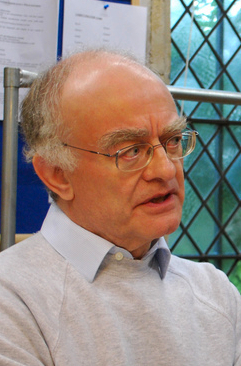
- The composer, 2012
- Genre: Sacred vocal music
- Text: Magnificat
- Language: Latin; English
- Performed: 26 May 1990: Carnegie Hall, New York
- Published: 1991: Oxford University Press
- Movements: 7

The Magnificat by John Rutter is a musical setting of the biblical canticle Magnificat, completed in 1990. The extended composition in seven movements "for soprano or mezzo-soprano solo, mixed choir, and orchestra (or chamber ensemble)" is based on the Latin text, interspersed with "Of a Rose, a lovely Rose", an anonymous English poem on Marian themes, the beginning of the Sanctus and a prayer to Mary. The music includes elements of Latin American music.

The composer conducted the first performance in Carnegie Hall on 26 May 1990, and the first recording with the Cambridge Singers and the City of London Sinfonia. Oxford University Press published Magnificat in 1991 and Of a Rose, a lovely Rose separately in 1998.

While the canticle Magnificat was often set to music, being a regular part of Catholic vespers and Anglican evensong, Rutter's work is one of few extended settings, along with Bach's composition. Critical reception has been mixed, appreciating that the "orchestration is brilliant and very colourful" and "the music weaves a magical spell of balm and peace", but also experiencing a "virtual encyclopedia of musical cliches, a ... predictable exercise in glitzy populism".

== History and text ==
The Magnificat or Song of Mary is one of the three New Testament canticles, the others being Nunc dimittis and Benedictus. Mary sings the song on the occasion of her visit to Elizabeth, as narrated in the Gospel of Luke (Luke 1:39–56). It is a daily part in Catholic vesper services and Anglican Evening Prayer.

Rutter followed the tradition of setting it to music, especially the work by Johann Sebastian Bach which also structures the text in movements of different character. Magnificat was composed on a commission by MidAmerica Productions, a concert organisation in New York performing in Carnegie Hall with a choir of about 200 voices selected in the United States. Rutter was inspired by "jubilant celebrations of Mary in Hispanic cultures" and conceived the work as a "bright Latin-flavoured fiesta". In addition to the liturgical Latin text, he chose a 15th-century poem, which compares Mary to a rose. In the third movement, the beginning of the Sanctus is inserted after the mentioning of "sanctum nomen eius" (his holy name). The text of the doxology in the last movement is interspersed with a prayer to Mary, "Sancta Maria, succure miseris" (Holy Mary, help those in need). Rutter supplied a singing version in English for the complete work.

== Music and scoring ==
The composer wrote:

The … Magnificat – a poetic outpouring of praise, joy and trust in God, ascribed by Luke to the Virgin Mary on learning that she was to give birth to Christ – has always been one of the most familiar and well-loved of scriptural texts, not least because of its inclusion as a canticle in the Catholic office of Vespers and in Anglican Evensong. Musical settings of it abound, though surprisingly few of them since J.S. Bach's time give the text extended treatment. I had long wished to write an extended Magnificat, but was not sure how to approach it until I found my starting point in the association of the text with the Virgin Mary. In countries such as Spain, Mexico and Puerto Rico, feast days of the Virgin are joyous opportunities for people to take to the streets and celebrate with singing, dancing and processions. These images of outdoor celebration were, I think, somewhere in my mind as I wrote, though I was not fully conscious of the fact till afterwards. I was conscious of following Bach's example in adding to the liturgical text – with the lovely old English poem 'Of a Rose' and the prayer 'Sancta Maria' (both of which strengthen the Marian connection) and with the interpolated Sanctus, sung to the Gregorian chant of the Missa cum jubilo in the third movement. The composition of Magnificat occupied several hectic weeks early in 1990, and the première took place in May of that year in Carnegie Hall, New York.

Musicologist John Bawden notes that Rutter's work has several features in common with Bach's setting: both repeat material of the first movement in the last, use chant melodies, devote "more reflective verses" to a soloist, and insert additional text, in Bach's work texts related to Christmas.

Rutter scored the work for a female soloist, soprano or mezzo-soprano, who at times represents Mary, and a mixed choir, usually SATB, but sometimes with divided parts. He offers two versions, for orchestra or chamber ensemble. The orchestra consists of

- woodwind: 2 flutes, 2 oboes, 2 clarinets, 2 bassoons
- brass: 4 horns, 3 trumpets, 3 trombones, tuba
- percussion: timpani, percussion (glockenspiel, snare drum, crash cymbals, suspended cymbal, tambourine, bongos)
- strings: harp, strings

The chamber version replaces the brass mostly by the organ and uses only one each of flute, oboe, clarinet and horn. Timpani, percussion and harp are the same as in the orchestra version, and for the strings, a minimum of two first violins, two second violins, two violas, one cello and one double bass required.

== Movements ==
The following table shows the incipit, Tempo marking, voices, time, key and text sources for the seven movements. The information is given for the beginning of the movements. Rutter frequently shifts tempo, key and time. The source for the details is the vocal score, unless otherwise noted.

Movements of Rutter's Magnificat
No.	Incipit	Tempo marking	Scoring	Time	Key	Text source
1	Magnificat anima mea	Bright and joyful	Chorus	3/8 — 3/4	G major	Luke 1:46–48
2	Of a Rose, a lovely Rose	Tranquil and flowing	Chorus	3/4	Dorian mode	15th-century English poem
3	Quia fecit mihi magna	Andante maestoso	Chorus	3/4	D major	Luke 1:49, Sanctus
4	Et misericordia	Andante fluente	Soprano, chorus	3/4	A♭ major	Luke 1:50
5	Fecit potentiam	Allegro energico	Chorus	common time		Luke 1:51–52
6	Esurientes	Slow and calm	Soprano, chorus	12/8	B♭ major	Luke 1:53–55
7	Gloria Patri	Maestoso	Chorus	3/4	D major	Doxology, interspersed: Sancta Maria

=== 1. Magnificat anima mea ===
The work opens with a short instrumental introit in G major, marked "Bright and joyful", alternating between 3/8 and 3/4 time. Simple polyrhythms are achieved by dividing the 3/4 measure in two for the orchestra and in three for the chorus. While Bach structured the first verses of the canticle in several movements of different scoring, Rutter unites the first three verses in one choral movement, treating the different ideas to different motifs and setting, and repeating the first verse at the end as a recapitulation.

The soprano and alto enter in unison Magnificat anima mea (My soul doth magnify [the Lord]). The vocal motif of Magnificat leaps up a major sixth and rises even higher. It is repeated several times in different combinations of voices, always in homophony. The second verse, Et exultavit spiritus meus (And my spirit hath rejoiced), is sung first by soprano and alto in third parallels. The men repeat it similarly and continuo in Deo (in God), Deo accented by the characteristic figure of a lower mordent, which is repeated throughout the whole work, often when God is mentioned. The conclusion of the idea, in Deo salutari meo (in God my saviour), is expressed by a descending line, alternating the rhythm, one measure in 3/4, one 6/8, and alternating the women's voices in sequences. A short recapitulation of Magnificat anima mea marks the end of the second verse.

The beginning of the third verse, Quia respexit humilitatem (For he hath regarded the low estate [of his handmaiden]), is rendered even simpler: the sequences are repeated in even rhythm, then broadened and coloured by parallel triads. The continuation, Ecce enim (for, behold, [from henceforth … shall call me blessed]), builds in similar fashion, with all parts divided, to the climax of the first movement on the word beatam ("blessed" or "happy"), marked "f dolce". The text omnes generationes (all generations) is again given in sequences of descending lines, now alternating one measure of 6/8 and one of 4/4. While the bass sings the line first, the tenor adds a sequence of sustained notes rising step by step one fifth. In Bach's treatment of the same text, each entry of a fugue theme is one step, covering an octave in measures 15 to 20 of Omnes generationes. A repeat of the text and the motifs of verse 1 concludes the movement, ending on Magnificat, without retard, with accents on each syllable and cut short.

=== 2. Of a Rose, a lovely Rose ===
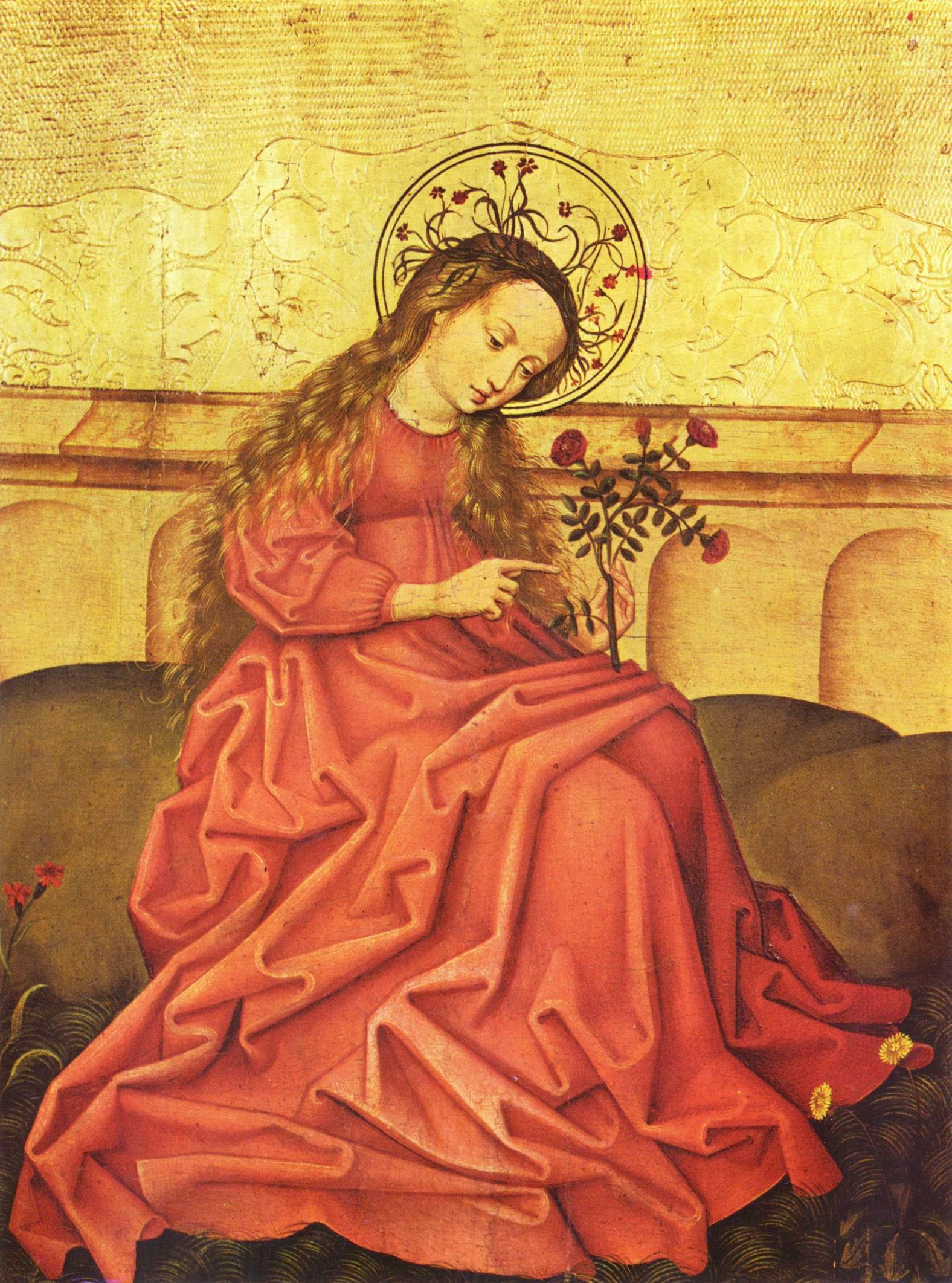
Madonna im Gärtchen, anonymous Rhenish Master, 16th century

Rutter inserted an anonymous English poem from the 15th century, Of a Rose, a lovely Rose, as the second movement. Marked "Tranquil and flowing", it imitates chant singing, with flexible times and in Doric mode. The poet imagines Jesus as a rose springing from Mary, comparable to "Es ist ein Ros entsprungen". She is seen as a rose bush with five branches: the Annunciation, the Star of Bethlehem, the three Kings, the fall of the devil's power, and heaven. The last stanza asks Mary to “shield us from the fiendes bond”. The eight stanzas, in four lines of which three rhyme, are set as variations of an old tune. The short refrain is first sung by the soprano alone, immediately repeated by soprano, alto and tenor, the voices in unison but for triads on "lovely". It is repeated after the first stanza by soprano and tenor in unison. After the fourth stanza, it appears again, now in three different parts, and a last time before the final prayer, again slightly different. The first stanza ("... this rose began to spring ...") is sung by the bass, the second ("... out of her bosom ...") by the alto, the third ("... an angel from heaven's tower ...") by two sopranos and alto, the fourth ("... star shone over Bethlehem ...") by tenor and bass, the fifth ("... three kinges ...") by the bass, the sixth ("... sprang to hell ...") by four parts SATB, the seventh ("... sprang to heaven ...") by soprano and alto, the final prayer ("Pray we to her ...") by four parts again but mostly in unison.

=== 3. Quia fecit mihi magna ===
Quia fecit mihi magna (For he [that is mighty] hath done to me great things), concentrates on two ideas from the canticle verse. Marked "Andante maestoso", the choral movement in D major opens with solemn dotted rhythms, features of the French overture. A motiv of four measures is repeated three times, interrupted by fanfares. Then it is repeated five times, beginning with only the basses, marked piano, adding the motif in a higher part each time, with two sopranos, and increasing volume and intensity.

The second idea of the verse, Et sanctum nomen eius (And holy is his name), builds similarly. The alto begins, marked "dolce and tranquillo" (sweet and calm) a melody of ten measures, beginning like the first motiv but more flowing. The alto keeps singing sustained notes, while first soprano and tenor sing the melody in a canon one measure apart, then bass and soprano sing it in a canon, one measure apart and the soprano a fifth higher. Finally the sustained notes are sung by the bass, while the other three voices continue the imitation. The movement is closed by a chant-like accompanied Sanctus, taken from the Missa cum jubilo.

=== 4. Et misericordia ===
Et misericordia (And his mercy [is on them that fear him from generation to generation]) is sung by the soprano soloist first, repeated by the choir. A motif alternating a measure of six undulating eighth-notes and a measure of one long note dominates the movement. In a middle section, the chorus continues the material, while the soloist picks up the first Magnificat in text and motif.

=== 5. Fecit potentiam ===
Fecit potentiam (He hath shewed strength) begins with irregular energetic rhythms. The basses sing a short call which dominates the movement, first marked "pp marcato". The other voices join from the lowest to the highest, only then is the thought continued in bracchio suo [with his arm). In a process similar to movement 3, the voices build bass to divided soprano. Dispersit superbos (he hath scattered the proud [in the imagination of their hearts]) is presented in fast 3/8 movement, while Deposuit potentes de sede (He hath put down the mighty from their seats) is rendered on a steady monotone beat by bass, then tenor, then alto. In great contrast, the soprano begins softly a rising melody on et exaltavit humiles (and exalted them of low degree), joined by all other voices.

=== 6. Esurientes ===
The last movement devoted to the canticle summarizes the rest of the text in Esurientes ([He hath filled] the hungry), sung again by the soloist, supported by continuous eighth-notes in 12/8 time in the orchestra and answered by the chorus.

=== 7. Gloria Patri ===
The composition is closed with the doxology Gloria Patri (Glory be to the Father). The music is based on movement 3, repeating the dotted rhythm and the building from bass to two sopranos. A prayer addressing Mary interrupts the doxology: Sancta Maria, asking "for support of humanity, including the needy, the timid, the clergy, women, and the laity". It is sung by the soloist on sustained chords in the orchestra. The final Sicut erat in principio (As it was in the beginning), repeats, as often, material from the very beginning of the work, the initial Magnificat motif, and the descending lines ending on a mordent on Amen.

== Performance, recording and publishing ==
The first performance, conducted by the composer, was on 26 May 1990 in Carnegie Hall, with soloist Maria Alsatti and the Manhattan Chamber Orchestra. Rutter also conducted a recording with soloist Patricia Forbes, the Cambridge Singers and the City of London Sinfonia. A performance lasts about 40 minutes. Timothy Mangan reviewed the reportedly first performance on the West Coast with the Master Chorale of Orange County conducted by William Hall. He described the piece as a "virtual encyclopedia of musical cliches, a long-winded, tamely tonal, predictable exercise in glitzy populism." He heard influence of composers such as Aaron Copland, Igor Stravinsky and Vaughan Williams.

The work was published by Oxford University Press in 1991. The composer provided an optional English singable version of the Latin parts. Of a Rose, a lovely Rose was published individually in 1998.

A reviewer notes that Rutter "emphasises the joy experienced by a … soon to be mother", with "a good balance between the extrovert and intimate", and singable melodies with an understanding for the voice. He ends: "The orchestration is brilliant and very colourful, with lots of trumpet fanfares complementing the festive spirit of the music." Nick Barnard, reviewing a 2006 recording of the chamber version with the Choirs of St. Albans Cathedral conducted by Andrew Lucas, summarizes that "the faster dynamic sections rely too heavily on formulaic use of ostinato rhythms and Rutter fingerprint instrumental colours. Set against this many of the lyrical passages are amongst his finest." More specifically he notes that in the Esurientes "the music weaves a magical spell of balm and peace – for me the highlight of the entire disc and one of Rutter's moments of greatest inspiration in any work."

== Selected international performances ==
Rutter's Magnificat has been performed in different countries by professional, collegiate, festival and community ensembles. Selected documented performances include:

Selected performances by country
Year	Country	Orchestra / choir / ensemble	Conductor
1990	United States	Choirs from Arkansas, Connecticut, Minnesota and Texas, with the Manhattan Chamber Orchestra	John Rutter
1991	United Kingdom	Coventry Cathedral; ensemble not specified in the available source	Not specified
2018	Australia	UWA Choral Society	Christopher van Tuinen
2018	Bulgaria	National Philharmonic Orchestra and Municipal Choir "Gena Dimitrova" – Pleven	Nayden Todorov
2022	Spain	Orquesta Filarmónica de España and Coro de la Universidad Politécnica de Madrid	Javier Corcuera
2023	Poland	Symphony Orchestra of the Academy of Art in Szczecin	Not specified
2023	Singapore	Vocal Associates Ensemble of Young Voices and Vocal Associates Chamber Choir	Khor Ai Ming
2023	Italy	Alpen Symphony Orchestra, Schola Poliphonica del Santuario di Monte Berico and Coro Amici della Musica di Barbarano Vicentino	Stefano Torboli
2025	Canada	Gatineau Symphony Orchestra and Choir of the Gatineau Symphony Orchestra	Yves Léveillé
