= Brother Heinrich's Christmas =

Fable

The cover art of Rutter's recording.

Brother Heinrich's Christmas, a fable set to music by John Rutter, is performed by a narrator, mixed choir, and small orchestra. The bassoon plays a special part, while an oboe solo is the theme of the piece.

The lyrics are about Heinrich Suso, a 14th-century Dominican friar, who according to legend, notated the carol In dulci jubilo after it had been sung to him by a band of angels; he is unexpectedly aided to finish it by Sigismund, his donkey.

It has been recorded by the Cambridge Singers and the City of London Sinfonia with Brian Kay and is frequently played on radio stations as part of the Christmas programming.
