= Christmas Lullaby =

1989 composition by John Rutter

- by John Rutter
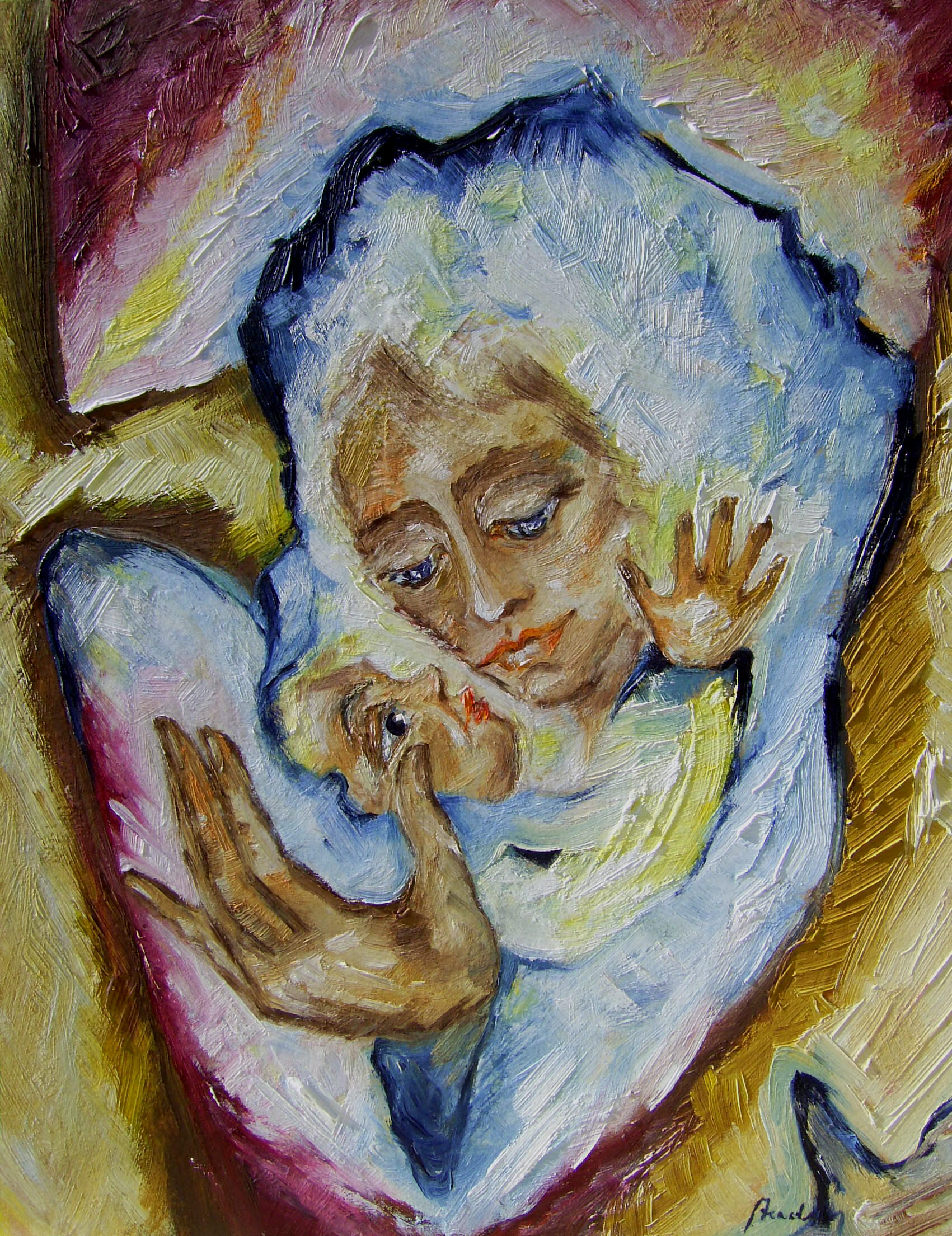
- Maria mit dem Kinde, by Dagmar Anders, 1990
- Dedication: David Willcocks
- Published: 1990
- Scoring: SATB choir and piano or organ or small orchestra

Christmas Lullaby is a popular sacred choral composition by John Rutter, a lullaby for Christmas. He wrote his own text, beginning "Clear in the darkness", three stanzas with the refrain "Ave Maria" ("Hail Mary"). Rutter scored the piece for four vocal parts (SATB) and piano, adding other versions. He composed it on a 1989 commission from The Bach Choir for the celebration of the 70th birthday of their conductor David Willcocks. It was first performed at the choir's Christmas concert at the Royal Albert Hall in London, an event that Rutter knew from being a member of the audience as a boy.

The work was published by Oxford University Press in 1990. It was published in a German edition, Weihnachts-Wiegenlied, with text translated by Alex Grendelmeier, by Bärenreiter in 1998. It became part of the John Rutter Anniversary Edition.

Christmas Lullaby has been recorded several times, notably with the composer conducting the Cambridge Singers on an album The John Rutter Christmas Album. It was also sung by the chamber choir Polyphony with the City of London Sinfonia, conducted by Stephen Layton.

== Text and music ==
Rutter, who composed many works to celebrate Christmas, wrote his own text for Christmas Lullaby, beginning "Clear in the darkness a light shines in Bethlehem". He alludes to several aspects of the Christmas story, with a focus on combining reverence for the baby and for Mary, his mother, with the traditional words "Ave Maria" (Hail Mary).

Marked Andante legato, the music is in F major and 3/4 time. In the first stanza, the women's voices in unison sing of the angels, the men's voices of the wise men. In four-part homophony, marked pianissimo, all voices hail Mary, growing to mezzoforte in a second greeting. The second stanza, which switches the entrances of men and women, is focused on the King in the manger. In the third stanza, all are called to revere "with hearts full of love." The "Ave Maria" returns, this last time with some counterpoint for a climax, but ending in the same soft homophony as before.
