= Angels' Carol =

Choral Christmas piece

- by John Rutter
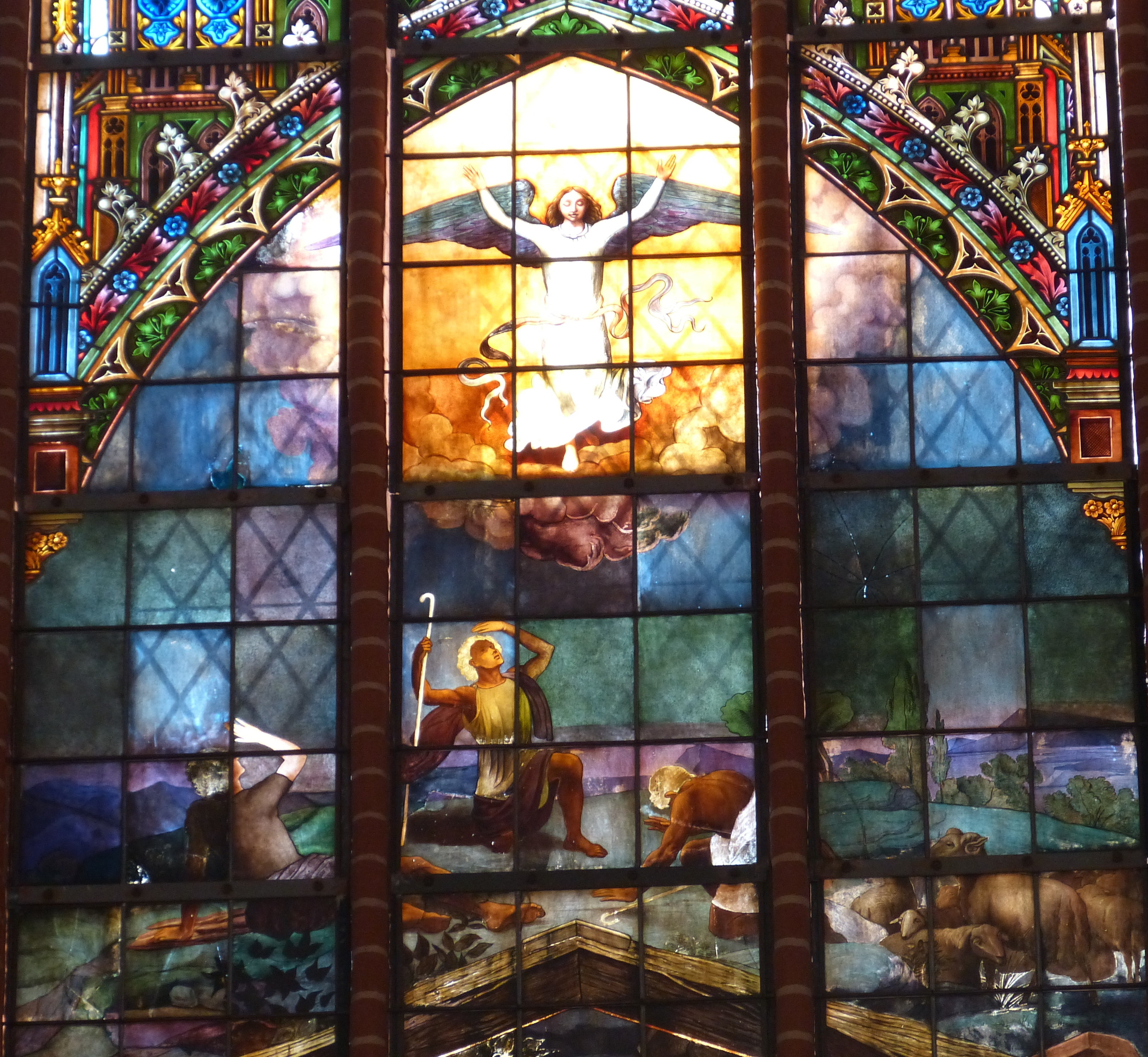
- Annunciation to the Shepherds at the Schweriner Dom
- Published: 1999
- Scoring: SATB or SS or SA choir with harp, piano or orchestra

Angels' Carol is a popular sacred choral piece by John Rutter for Christmas. He wrote his own text, beginning "Have you heard the sound of the angel voices", three stanzas with the refrain "Gloria in excelsis Deo". It has been part of recordings of collections of Christmas music, including one conducted by the composer.

== History ==
Rutter first composed Angels’ Carol in the 1980s to be performed by the winners of a competition choirboy and choirgirl in London, now defunct. He later arranged it for mixed-voice choir (SATB), with harp, piano or orchestra. A version for upper voices (SS or SA) is also available. All versions of the work were published by Oxford University Press.

== Text and music ==
Rutter, who composed many works to celebrate Christmas, wrote his own text for Angels' Carol, beginning "Have you heard the sound of the angel voices". The text alludes to several aspects of the Christmas story, with the Latin refrain "Gloria in excelsis Deo" from the angels' song mentioned in the Gospel of Luke narration of the annunciation to the shepherds.

The music is in F major, alla breve-time, and marked "Brightly". It begins with two measures of arpeggios by harp or piano, reminiscent of Bach's Prelude in C major from The Well-Tempered Clavier. The harp, the first instrument the composer had in mind, was also played by King David, and plays a major role in Britten's A Ceremony of Carols. The sopranos, optionally with the altos, sing the first phrase, marked "eagerly". Their motif, an upward triad of two identical quavers and two crotchets beginning after the beat and arriving at a long note. The rhythmic pattern is repeated in all voices throughout the verses. The reply in a different key is given by the tenors alone, then the first lenor is repeated by sopranos and tenors in unison, leading to the first refrain "Gloria", which is marked "joyfully". The quotation from the angels' song after annunciation to the shepherds according to the Gospel of Luke is sung by the choir, now in harmony with third parallels. In the refrain, two quavers begin on the beat. In the second verse, the tenors have the first line, "He is come in peace", with the upper voices humming. The third verse, "He will bring new light", is transposed by a shift in harmony, and is intensified by imitation, and by more entries with new thoughts about Earth and Heavens rejoicing. The final refrain also appears is in a denser texture with divided sopranos, before the piece ends softly, marked "Tranquil", with the high voices sing "Christ is born" over the humming men's voices.

== Recordings ==
Angels' Carol was recorded in 2001 as part of The John Rutter Christmas Album, sung by The Cambridge Singers with the City of London Sinfonia, conducted by the composer. Stephen Layton led a recording with his Polyphony chamber choir and the City of London Sinfonia, released in 2001. It was recorded as part of A Christmas Celebration in 2014 by the Hallé Choir, youth choir, children’s choir and orchestra, conducted by Stephen Bell.
