= Requiem (Rutter) =

1985 musical work by John Rutter

- Sacred vocal music by John Rutter
- Cover art of the recording conducted by the composer
- Text: Parts from Requiem; Bible verses
- Language: Latin; English
- Performed: 13 October 1985: Dallas, Texas
- Published: 1986: Oxford University Press
- Movements: 7

John Rutter's Requiem is a musical setting of parts of the Latin Requiem with added psalms and biblical verses in English, completed in 1985. It is scored for soprano, mixed choir and orchestra or chamber ensemble.

Five of its seven movements are based on text from the Latin Requiem Mass, while the second movement is a setting of "Out of the deep" (Psalm 130) and the sixth movement is an anthem The Lord is my Shepherd (Psalm 23) which Rutter had earlier written. The first movement combines the Introit and Kyrie, the third is Pie Jesu, with soprano solo. The central movement is a lively Sanctus, followed by Agnus Dei and finally Lux aeterna. In the last two movements, Rutter combines the liturgical Latin text with biblical verses in English.

Four of the movements of the Requiem were first performed at Fremont Presbyterian Church, Sacramento, California, on 14 March 1985. The first performance of the complete work was at Lovers' Lane United Methodist Church, Dallas, Texas, on 13 October 1985. It was published in 1986 by Oxford University Press.

== History ==
Rutter completed his Requiem in 1985. It bears the dedication "in memoriam L. F. R.", John Rutter's father, who had died the previous year.

He conducted the first performance of the complete work on 13 October 1985 at Lovers' Lane United Methodist Church, Dallas, Texas, where the director of Music Allen Pote prepared the Sanctuary Choir and orchestra. The soprano soloist was Karen Shafer. Movements 1, 2, 4, and 7 had been performed on 14 March 1985 at Fremont Presbyterian Church, Sacramento, California, by the Sanctuary Choir and ensemble, prepared by Mel Olson and also conducted by the composer.

The Requiem was published in 1986 by Oxford University Press, with a singable English text also for the Latin passages.

== Music ==
Rutter scored the Requiem for mixed choir and orchestra. It features solos for cello, soprano and oboe. He prepared two versions, one for a chamber ensemble and one for orchestra. The ensemble consists of flute, oboe, timpani, glockenspiel, harp, cello and organ, while the orchestra has 2 flutes, oboe, 2 clarinets, bassoon, 2 horns, timpani, glockenspiel, harp and strings.

Rutter structured the work in seven movements, similar to the setting of Gabriel Fauré. One of the movements is The Lord is my Shepherd, a setting of Psalm 23, which he had written as an anthem in 1976.

=== Table of movements ===
The following table shows the title, Tempo marking, voices, time, key and text sources for the seven movements. The information is given for the beginning of the movements. Rutter frequently shifts tempo, key and time. The source for the details is the vocal score, unless otherwise noted.

Movements of Rutter's Requiem
No.	Title	Tempo marking	Vocal	Time	Key	Text source
1	Requiem aeternam	Slow and solemn	Chorus	3/4	C minor G major	Introit and Kyrie
2	Out of the deep	Slow, with some rubato	Chorus	4/4	C minor	Psalms 130
3	Pie Jesu	Andante e dolce	Soprano; Chorus	3/4	F major	Pie Jesu
4	Sanctus	Andante maestoso	Chorus	3/4	C major	Sanctus, Benedictus
5	Agnus Dei	Slow and solemn	Chorus	4/4	C minor	Agnus Dei; John 11:25
6	The Lord is my shepherd	Slow but flowing	Chorus	2/4	C major	Psalms 23
7	Lux aeterna	Moderato	Soprano; Chorus	4/4	C minor G major	Revelation 14:13; Introit, Kyrie

==== 1 ====
The first movement consists of the Introit from the Requiem ("Requiem aeternam") and the Kyrie. The work opens with a steady beat of the tympani, to which instruments enter, first without a defined key. The voices enter in measure 7, stating in unison on the note C "Requiem aeternam". The text beginning "Kyrie eleison" is set in G major.

==== 2 ====
The second movement is entitled Out of the Deep, the English version of Psalm 130, a psalm commonly used at Anglican funerals. It is set in C minor and begins with an expanded cello solo. Its motifs are picked up by the voices, first alto and bass in unison, in low register.

==== 3 ====
The third movement is the Pie Jesu, a text that concludes the sequence Dies irae. Rutter, as before him Fauré and Duruflé, omits the sequence, but includes the prayer to Jesus for rest. It begins with a soprano soloist singing with a very light accompaniment. The chorus only echoes the words "Dona eis requiem, Dona eis sempiternam requiem".

==== 4 ====
The central movement is the Sanctus (with Benedictus), a lively, and exclamatory movement which is brightly orchestrated with bells, flute, and oboe and occasional timpani recalling the passage in Old Testament scripture in Isaiah 6 about the worship of the six-winged seraphim in the heavenly throne-room of God.

==== 5 ====
The fifth movement is the Agnus Dei (Lamb of God) of the Requiem. Rutter uses a steady beat on one note, similar to the timpani of the first movement. The Latin text is contrasted with another biblical passage, "Man that is born of a woman hath but a short time to live" from the Book of Job. The call Agnus Dei in measure 58 is the dynamic climax of the Requiem. After an instrumental interlude which quotes "Victimae paschali laudes" associated with Easter, the voices sing very softly "I am the resurrection and the life", from the Book of John.

==== 6 ====
The sixth movement is Psalm 23, another psalm commonly used at Anglican funerals. It mentions the valley of the shadow of death, but is an expression of trust in God and hope for dwelling in his house forever.

==== 7 ====
The seventh movement includes words from the 1662 Book of Common Prayer Burial Service ("I heard a voice from heaven...") and the communion chant from Requiem (Lux aeterna).

The work lasts about 40 minutes.

== Recordings ==
Rutter conducted the first recording of the Requiem with the Cambridge Singers and the City of London Sinfonia in 1986, combined with an orchestral version of his anthem "I will lift up mine eyes". In 1998, Stephen Cleobury conducted the Requiem with the Choir of King's College, Cambridge, and the City of London Sinfonia, combined with several shorter chorale works by Rutter for choir, some with organist Robert Quinney, others with brass band Wallace Collection.

The version with ensemble was recorded in 2002 by Timothy Brown conducting the Choir of Clare College with members of the City of London Sinfonia and organist Nicholas Rimmer, combined with other music by Rutter.

== Selected international performances ==
Rutter's Requiem has entered the international choral and orchestral repertory, with documented performances by professional, collegiate, festival and community ensembles in different countries. Selected later performances include:

Selected performances by country
Year	Country	Orchestra / choir / ensemble	Conductor
2016	South Africa	Symphony Choir of Johannesburg	Richard Cock
2018	Italy	Orchestra da Camera Fiorentina and American college choirs	John Rutter; Terry Russell
2022	Australia	RMP Oratorio Festival Choir, with singers from the Royal Melbourne Philharmonic Choir, Melbourne University Choral Society and Box Hill Chorale, and players from the Royal Melbourne Philharmonic Orchestra	Andrew Wailes
2022	Poland	The Katowice City Singers' Ensemble Camerata Silesia, with organ and instrumental ensemble	Magdalena Hałas
2023	Canada	Elmer Iseler Singers, Capital Chamber Choir and the Music and Beyond Festival Orchestra	John Rutter
2023	United States	The Continuo Arts Symphonic Chorus, Civic Chorale of New Jersey and Youth Choir of New Jersey	John Rutter
2024	Germany	Vocalensemble Penzberg and Sinfonieorchester im Pfaffenwinkel	Günther Pfannkuch
2024	United Kingdom	Oxford Philharmonic Orchestra and the Choir of Merton College, Oxford	John Rutter
2025	Bulgaria	Sofia Philharmonic Orchestra and National Philharmonic Choir	Nayden Todorov
2026	Cyprus	Cyprus Symphony Orchestra and Cyprus Youth Symphony Orchestra Choir	Levan Jagaev
