= Mass of the Children =

- Missa brevis by John Rutter
- Cover art of Rutter's original 2003 recording
- Text: Mass; English poems
- Language: Latin; English
- Performed: February 13, 2003: Carnegie Hall, New York
- Movements: five
- Scoring: soprano; baritone; children's choir; mixed choir; orchestra or ensemble and organ

Mass of the Children is a major work of English composer John Rutter and a non-liturgical Missa brevis, with the traditional Latin and Greek Mass text interwoven with several English poems.

Mass of the Children consists of five movements:

1. Kyrie
2. Gloria
3. Sanctus and Benedictus
4. Agnus Dei
5. Finale (Dona nobis pacem)

The Finale uses additional text from the Agnus Dei which was not used in the preceding movement, as well as two prayer adaptations by Rutter and a poem by Bishop Thomas Ken (An Evening Hymn). Another of Ken's poems was incorporated into the Kyrie (A Morning Hymn), and a poem by William Blake (The Lamb, from Songs of Innocence and of Experience) is interwoven with the Agnus Dei.

Mass of the Children exists in three different instrumentations, with all versions are for adult mixed (SATB) choir, children's choir (SSA), baritone and soprano soloists. The first version is for full orchestra, the second for chamber ensemble and organ and the third for concert band with optional vocals. The first two versions have been recorded: the full orchestral version on Rutter's own Collegium label conducted by the composer and the chamber version on the Naxos label conducted by Timothy Brown.

Mass of the Children was first performed on February 13, 2003, at New York's Carnegie Hall.

The 2003 album was recorded with soloists Joanne Lunn (soprano) and Roderick Williams (baritone).
