= Suite Antique =

Score published by Oxford University Press

Suite Antique is a 1979 concertante work by John Rutter that is written for harpsichord, flute and string orchestra.

Rutter composed the piece for a concert at which Bach's fifth Brandenburg concerto was to be performed, and so decided to write the piece for the same ensemble. One of Rutter's most popular orchestral works, it has become an important standard in contemporary flute repertoire and been recorded several times by Rutter and others. It has six movements; Prelude, Ostinato, Aria, Waltz, Chanson and Rondeau.

Rutter later created an arrangement for harp and strings, and published it in 2011 as Suite Lyrique.
