= Donkey Carol =

"Donkey Carol" is a Christmas choral work composed by John Rutter in the 1970s and originally published by Oxford University Press. Like "Jesus Child", it was originally commissioned by Simon Lindley, the then choir director of St Alban's School, Hertfordshire, England.
