= Now thank we all our God (Rutter) =

- by John Rutter
- Text: Now Thank We All Our God
- Published: 1974
- Scoring: SATB choir; brass ensemble; timpani; organ

"Now thank we all our God" (1974) is a sacred choral composition by John Rutter, based on the hymn of the same name. Rutter scored the Festival hymn with introductory fanfare for four vocal parts (SATB), brass ensemble (four trumpets, two trombones or two horns, bass trombone and optional tuba), timpani, percussion and organ, adding other versions. The work was published by Oxford University Press in 1974, as No. 1 of Two Hymns of Praise. It takes about four minutes to perform.
