= 2008 Temple Festival =

The 2008 Temple Festival was a multi-disciplinary festival celebrating the 400th anniversary of James I of England granting the Honourable Societies of the Inner Temple and the Middle Temple the freehold of the Temple lands, by letters patent.

== History ==
The 1608 charter imposed a number of conditions on Inner and Middle Temple in order that they retain the freehold in perpetuity: the accommodation and legal training of students, the maintenance of the Temple Church as a place of worship and the provision of lodging for its Master.

It also marks the beginning of the modern Bar, founded on the relationship between the two learned societies, their property in the Inns and the barristers who lived and worked there. The Inner and Middle Temple are two of the four Inns of Court to which English barristers must belong before they can be called to the English bar. Over the years, there have also been many barristers called to the English bar by the two Inns who have subsequently gone to practice in other parts of the world; some have become statesmen. Mahatma Gandhi is perhaps the best known of all.

== Events ==
This significant anniversary in the history of the Inns was marked by a year of celebration and rededication to their fundamental aims of:

- Legal education, collegiality and sustaining the Temple Church as required by King James
- Working to maintain the rule of law within society
- Contributing to the standards of the legal system
- Fostering the common law throughout the world
