= Shepherd's Pipe Carol =

Modern Christmas carol

Song
- Language: English
- Written: 1966
- Published: 1967
- Genre: Christmas carol
- Composer(s): John Rutter

The "Shepherd's Pipe Carol" is a modern Christmas carol composed by John Rutter. Rutter composed the carol whilst he was an undergraduate at university in 1966 with it being published a year later at the behest of David Willcocks.

== History ==
The "Shepherd's Pipe Carol" was composed by John Rutter in 1966 when he was studying as an undergraduate at Clare College at the University of Cambridge. Rutter stated that he believed his inspiration for writing it came from when he sang as a boy soprano during the opera "Amahl and the Night Visitors" and heard pipe music as the title character headed for Bethlehem with the Biblical Magi.

The carol was first performed by the Choir of Clare College, Cambridge, conducted by Rutter at a Christmas concert. A few days later, David Willcocks, the director of the Choir of King's College, Cambridge, requested a copy of the manuscript, and he made calls to Oxford University Press for it to be published and to EMI for it to be recorded. It was Rutter's first composition to be published. Rutter and Willcocks later formed a publishing partnership and helped to compile the Carols for Choirs series of hymnals from the second edition for the Church of England.

Prior to the breakup of the Soviet Union, choirs in the Baltic states reportedly circulated photocopies and faxes of the "Shepherd's Pipe Carol" to be sung as a sign of resistance to Soviet control.

== Lyrics and score ==
The lyrics of the "Shepherd's Pipe Carol", set after the annunciation to the shepherds, are in third person about a shepherd boy playing pipe music on the way to Bethlehem. The boy later states in the carol that he will perform his music for the baby Jesus when he reaches the stable where the Star of Bethlehem was located. The music is scored for SATB and organ or small orchestra.
