= Star Carol =

Christmas carol composed by John Rutter in 1972

- Christmas carol by John Rutter
- Written: 1972
- Language: English
- Composed: 1972
- Scoring: Mixed choir and children's choir or unison voices with keyboard or orchestra

Star Carol is a Christmas carol composed by John Rutter in 1972 and published by Oxford University Press.

== Recordings ==
The carol is recorded in 2022 by the lower voices and girls' choir of Merton College, Oxford, in their album In the Stillness, with organist Simon Hogan.
