= John Rutter =

English composer and conductor (born 1945)

Sir John Rutter CBE
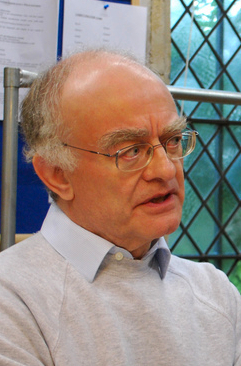
- Rutter in 2012
- Born: 24 September 1945 (age 81); London, England
- Education: Clare College, Cambridge
- Occupations: Composer; conductor
- Known for: Founding the Cambridge Singers
- Works: List of compositions
- Website: johnrutter.com

Sir John Milford Rutter (born 24 September 1945) is an English composer, conductor, editor, arranger, and record producer, mainly of choral music. He founded the Cambridge Singers who premiered and recorded many of his works for his own label Collegium Records. His compositions, extended pieces for choir and orchestra, such as Requiem and Magnificat, and many choral works including For the beauty of the earth, Christmas Carol and A Clare Benediction, are popular, especially in the UK and the United States. He is known for Christmas carols, in both arrangements of traditional melodies and new compositions, and Carols for Choirs anthology series compiled with David Willcocks.

== Biography ==
Born in London on 24 September 1945, the son of an industrial chemist and his wife, Rutter grew up living over the Globe pub on London's Marylebone Road. He was educated at Highgate School, where fellow pupils included John Tavener, Howard Shelley, Brian Chapple and Nicholas Snowman. As a chorister there, Rutter took part in the first (1963) recording of Benjamin Britten's War Requiem under the composer's baton. He then read music at Clare College, Cambridge, where he was a member of the choir. Whilst an undergraduate, he had his first compositions published, including the "Shepherd's Pipe Carol". He served as director of music at Clare College from 1975 to 1979, and led the choir to international prominence.

In 1981, Rutter founded his own choir, the Cambridge Singers, which he has conducted, and with which he has made many recordings of sacred choral repertoire (including his own works), particularly under his own label Collegium Records.

From 1985 to 1992, Rutter suffered severely from myalgic encephalomyelitis (ME, or chronic fatigue syndrome), which restricted his output; after 1985, he stopped writing music on commission, as he was unable to guarantee meeting deadlines.

Rutter also works as an arranger and editor. As a young man, he collaborated with Sir David Willcocks on five volumes of the extraordinarily successful Carols for Choirs anthology series.

He was inducted as a National Patron of Delta Omicron, an international professional music fraternity in 1985. Rutter is also a Vice-President of the Joyful Company of Singers, President of The Bach Choir, and President of the Association of British Choral Directors (ABCD).

Rutter resides at Hemingford Abbots in Cambridgeshire.

== Works ==
Rutter's compositions are chiefly choral, and include many Christmas carols, anthems and psalms, as well as extended works with orchestra such as the Gloria (1977), the Requiem (1985), the Magnificat (1990), and Mass of the Children (2003).

The world premiere of Rutter's Requiem (1985), and of his authoritative edition of Fauré's Requiem, took place with the Fox Valley Festival Chorus, in Illinois. In 2002, his setting of Psalm 150, commissioned for the Queen's Golden Jubilee, was performed at the Jubilee thanksgiving service in St Paul's Cathedral in London. Similarly, he was commissioned to write a new anthem, "This is the day", for the wedding of Prince William and Catherine Middleton in 2011, performed at Westminster Abbey during the service. The first two choral items sung at the Queen's Platinum Jubilee National Service of Thanksgiving in June 2022 were arrangements by Rutter, as were no fewer than six items performed at the Coronation of Charles III and Camilla.

There is also the children's opera Bang! (1975) and orchestral works such as Cityscapes (aka Partita, 1974), The Beatles Concerto (1977), Reflections (1979, a three movement piano concerto with orchestral prelude), Suite Antique (1979), and the more recent Four Miniatures for Orchestra (2021) and Celebration Overture (2023).

Rutter's work is published by Oxford University Press.

== Selected choral pieces ==
His many choral works and anthems often appear in different versions, for different voices, and accompaniment from keyboard to large orchestra, including:

- Angels' Carol (Christmas, 1980s)
- Brother Heinrich's Christmas (with narration)
- Candlelight Carol (Christmas, 1980s)
- Christmas Lullaby (Christmas, 1990)
- A Clare Benediction (blessing, 1998)
- Fancies, 6 choral settings of poetry by Shakespeare, Thomas Campion, Edward Lear and others (1971)
- Five Childhood Lyrics (Nursery rhymes, 1973)
- For the beauty of the earth, setting the hymn, for SATB, SA, or TTBB, and piano (anthem, 1980)
- A Gaelic Blessing for SATB and organ or guitar, commissioned in 1978 by the Chancel Choir of the First United Methodist Church, Omaha, Nebraska, in honour of minister of music Mel Olson (1978)
- I will sing with the spirit for SATB and organ, piano or orchestra (1994)
- Look at the world (harvest, 1996)
- Now thank we all our God (hymn arrangement, 1974)
- O clap your hands (Psalm 47, 1973)
- The Lord bless you and keep you (1981)
- The Lord is my Shepherd, SATB & organ (Psalm 23, 1978)
- Shepherd's Pipe Carol (Christmas, 1966)
- Star Carol (Christmas, 1972)
- This is the Day for the Wedding of Prince William and Catherine Middleton (2011)

== Influences ==
Rutter's music is eclectic, showing the influences of the French and English choral traditions of the early twentieth century as well as of light music and American classic songwriting. Almost every choral anthem and hymn that he writes has a subsequent orchestral accompaniment in addition to the standard piano/organ accompaniment, using various different instrumentations such as strings only, strings and woodwinds or full orchestra with brass and percussion. Many of his works have also been arranged for concert band with optional chorus.

Despite composing and conducting much religious music, Rutter told the US television programme 60 Minutes in 2003 that he was not a particularly religious man, yet still deeply spiritual and inspired by the spirituality of sacred verses and prayers. The main topics considered in the 60 Minutes programme, which was broadcast a week before Christmas 2003, were Rutter's popularity with choral groups in the United States, Britain, and other parts of the world, and his composition Mass of the Children, composed after the sudden death of his son Christopher while a student at Clare College, Cambridge, where Rutter himself had studied.

In a 2009 interview, Rutter discussed his understanding of "genius" and its unique ability to transform lives—whether that genius is communicated in the form of music or other media. He likened the purity of music to that of mathematics and connected the two with a reference to the discovery made by the early Greeks that frequencies of harmonic pitches are related by whole-number ratios.

== Reception ==
Rutter's music is very popular, particularly in the UK and US. Many hold him in high regard in the UK, as illustrated by the following quotation from a review in the London Evening Standard (25 September 2005): "For the infectiousness of his melodic invention and consummate craftsmanship, Rutter has few peers." Sue Lawley referred to Rutter as "the most celebrated and successful composer of carols alive today" and Sean Rafferty heralded Rutter as "a creator of not just carols, but wonderfully great things for the human voice." The Guardian remarked that "it is as a writer of carols that he has really made his mark ... His larger-scale works – particularly the Gloria (1974), Requiem (1985) and Magnificat (1990) – are also well established in the choral repertoire." David Willcocks considered Rutter "the most gifted composer of his generation."

== Recognition ==
In 1980 Rutter was made an honorary fellow of Westminster Choir College in Princeton, New Jersey, and in 1988 he became a fellow of the Guild of Church Musicians. In 1996 the Archbishop of Canterbury conferred a Lambeth Doctorate of Music upon him in recognition of his contribution to church music. Rutter was made a Commander of the Order of the British Empire (CBE) in the 2007 New Year Honours and knighted in the 2024 Birthday Honours, both for services to music.

In 2008 Rutter also became an honorary Bencher of the Middle Temple while playing a significant role in the 2008 Temple Festival. In 2023 Rutter became a Fellow of The Ivors Academy. Signified by the presentation of an Ivor Novello Award, Fellowship is also a position within the Academy's members and is the highest honour bestowed by the association of music creators.

Academic offices
Preceded by Peter Dennison	Director of Music for Clare College, Cambridge; 1975–1979	Succeeded by Timothy Brown
