= Timothy Brown (conductor) =

British choral conductor

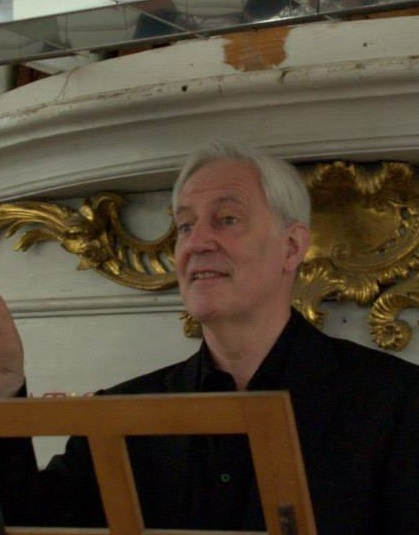
- Brown conducting in Innsbruck
- Born: 9 December 1946 (age 79)
- Education: King's College, Cambridge
- Occupation: Conductor
- Known for: Choral conductor, choirmaster of Clare College, Cambridge

Timothy (Tim) Brown (born 9 December 1946) is an English choral conductor.

== Education ==
He was a chorister at Westminster Abbey, and later an alto choral scholar at King's College, Cambridge, under the direction of Sir David Willcocks.

== Career ==
Following his time in college, Brown went on to become a lay clerk at New College, Oxford, and later worked as a schoolteacher for a number of years.

In 1979 he succeeded John Rutter as director of music at Clare College, Cambridge and director of the college choir. In his time at Clare he released several acclaimed recordings with the choir (largely on the Naxos label) by composers including Rutter, Vaughan Williams and Stainer.

In 1986 he re-founded the Cambridge University Chamber Choir, directing annual performances of all the major Bach and Handel oratorios. He later founded the London-based professional chamber choir, English Voices.

Many of his students have gone on to form successful careers in music, notably Norwich Cathedral organist David Dunnett, conductors Nicholas Collon and Robin Ticciati, and musician and plant-collector Jeremy Thurlow.

He has edited a number of choral volumes for Faber Music and is a contributing editor to the complete edition of music by William Walton, published by Oxford University Press.

In 2010, after 30 years in the role, he retired as director of music at Clare College, and became Visiting Director of the choir of Robinson College, Cambridge. In 2011 he founded The Zürich Singing Academy; he now divides his time between Zurich and Cambridge.

Preceded by John Rutter	Director of Music, Clare College, Cambridge; 1979–2010	Succeeded by Graham Ross
