= City of London Sinfonia =

English chamber orchestra

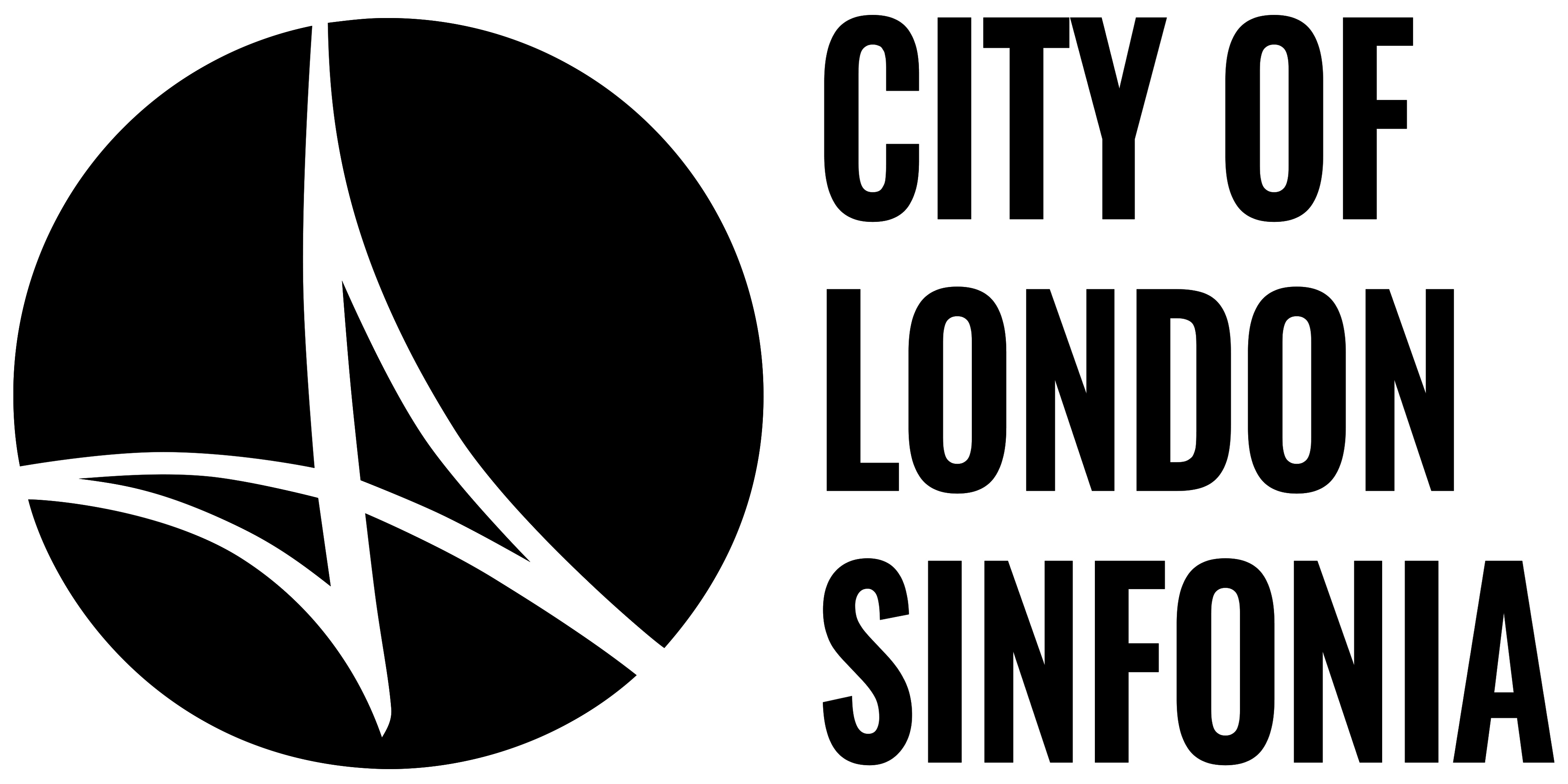

Background information
- Also known as: CLS
- Origin: London, UK
- Occupation: chamber orchestra
- Website: City of London Sinfonia

City of London Sinfonia (CLS) is an English chamber orchestra based in London. CLS is orchestra-in-residence at Opera Holland Park since 2004 and holds a residency at St Paul's Cathedral. CLS also performs regularly across the city of London in venues from East London clubs to traditional Central London concert halls. It is a registered charity under English law. CLS performs chamber orchestra and ensemble repertoire from the Baroque period to the present day, and has a programming focus on the human voice.

== History ==
Richard Hickox founded City of London Sinfonia in 1971 and remained its music director and artistic director until his death in November 2008. Past principal guest conductors have included Marin Alsop and Douglas Boyd. In November 2009, CLS announced the appointment of Stephen Layton as its second artistic director, effective with the 2010–2011 season. Simultaneously, CLS announced the appointment of Michael Collins also as principal conductor, effective in September 2010. In 2016, violinist Alexandra Wood was named creative director. In December 2022, CLS announced the appointment of Rowan Rutter as its newest chief executive officer, effective April 2023.

City of London Sinfonia has won various awards, such as the Royal Philharmonic Society's Large Ensemble Award, the "Best Opera Recording" Grammy for its recording of Benjamin Britten's Peter Grimes (1997), and the Arts, Business and Sustainability Award from the national organisation Arts & Business, in recognition of the achievements of its partnership with principal sponsor MMC. The orchestra has developed close links with joint venture partners in Mexico and Japan, having toured to Mexico in May 2015 and to Japan in March 2017.

CLS has recorded chamber orchestra and opera repertoire for a number of labels, including Chandos and Hyperion, and has worked on a number of choral albums with John Rutter and the Cambridge Singers for Collegium Records.

== Artistic leaders ==
- Richard Hickox (music director and artistic director, 1971–2008)
- Stephen Layton (artistic director and principal conductor, 2010–2016)
- Michael Collins (principal conductor, 2010–2017)
- Alexandra Wood (creative director, 2017–present)
