= Cambridge Singers =

English mixed voice chamber choir

The Cambridge Singers is an English mixed voice chamber choir formed in 1981 by their director John Rutter with the primary purpose of making recordings under their own label Collegium Records.

The group initially comprised former singers from the Choir of Clare College, Cambridge, where Rutter had previously been the music director.

They have been involved in the last four Fresh Aire albums (about "mankind's curiosities") of the Mannheim Steamroller band, by composer Chip Davis, but they are primarily a classical choral group.

They have recorded several highly acclaimed Christmas albums, including Christmas Day in the Morning, Christmas Night: Carols of the Nativity, Christmas Star, Christmas with the Cambridge Singers, and The Cambridge Singers Christmas Album.

== List of albums ==
- Gloria (1983 and 2005) with Philip Jones Brass Ensemble and City of London Sinfonia
- Fauré: Requiem and other sacred music (1984, 1988 and 2010)
- Hurry to Bethlehem: The Christmas Music of John Rutter (1985) with City of London Sinfonia
- There Is Sweet Music (1986, 2002)
- Christmas Night (1987) with City of London Sinfonia
- Flora gave me fairest flowers (1987, 2003)
- Faire is the Heaven (1988)
- Poulenc Sacred Music (1988, 2002) with City of London Sinfonia
- Treasures of English Church Music (1988)
- Brother Sun, Sister Moon (1988)
- Ave Verum Corpus (1989, 2002)
- Christmas with the Cambridge Singers (1989) with City of London Sinfonia
- Hail! Gladdening Light (1991)
- Rutter Magnificat (1991, 2017) with City of London Sinfonia
- Fancies (1992, 2005)
- Three Musical Fables (1992, 2003) with The King's Singers and City of London Sinfonia
- Rutter Requiem and Magnificat (1998)
- Hail! Queen of Heaven (2002), formerly Ave Gracia Plena (1992)
- Cambridge Singers A Cappella (1993, 2002)
- Images of Christ (1995)
- Stillness and Sweet Harmony (1996)
- Christmas Star (1997)
- Sing, Ye Heavens (2000) with City of London Sinfonia
- Feel the Spirit (2001, 2013) with the BBC Concert Orchestra and Melanie Marshall (mezzo-soprano)
- The John Rutter Christmas Album (2002)
- Mass of the Children (2003) with Cantate Youth Choir, City of London Sinfonia, Joanne Lunn (soprano) and Roderick Williams (baritone)
- The Cambridge Singers Christmas Album (2003) with City of London Sinfonia
- Be thou my Vision (2004) with City of London Sinfonia
- The Sprig of Thyme (2005) with City of London Sinfonia, formerly The Lark in the Clear Air (1993)
- Lighten Our Darkness (2006) with the Royal Philharmonic Orchestra, recorded in the Lady Chapel of Ely Cathedral
- Handel: Messiah (Highlights) (2007) with the Royal Philharmonic Orchestra
- Handel: Messiah (2007) with the Royal Philharmonic Orchestra
- A Christmas Festival (2008), with the Royal Philharmonic Orchestra and Farnham Youth Choir
- The Sacred Flame (2009) with La Nuova Musica
- A Song in Season (2010) with the Royal Philharmonic Orchestra
- This is the Day (2012) with Aurora Orchestra
- Sea Change (2013): the choral music of Richard Rodney Bennett
- O Praise the Lord of Heaven (2013)
- A Double Celebration (2014) with City of London Sinfonia
- The Gift of Life (2015) with the Royal Philharmonic Orchestra
- Visions and Requiem (2016) with Choristers of the Temple Church, Aurora Orchestra and Kerson Leong (violin)
- Stanford and Howells Remembered (2020), formerly I will lift up mine eyes (1992): music by Charles Stanford and Herbert Howells
- A Banquet of Voices (1994, and re-released in September 2020)
- I Sing of a Maiden (2021)
