= Bible Hill, Jerusalem =

Site of natural and archaeological importance in Jerusalem

Coordinates: 31°46′05″N 35°13′31″E

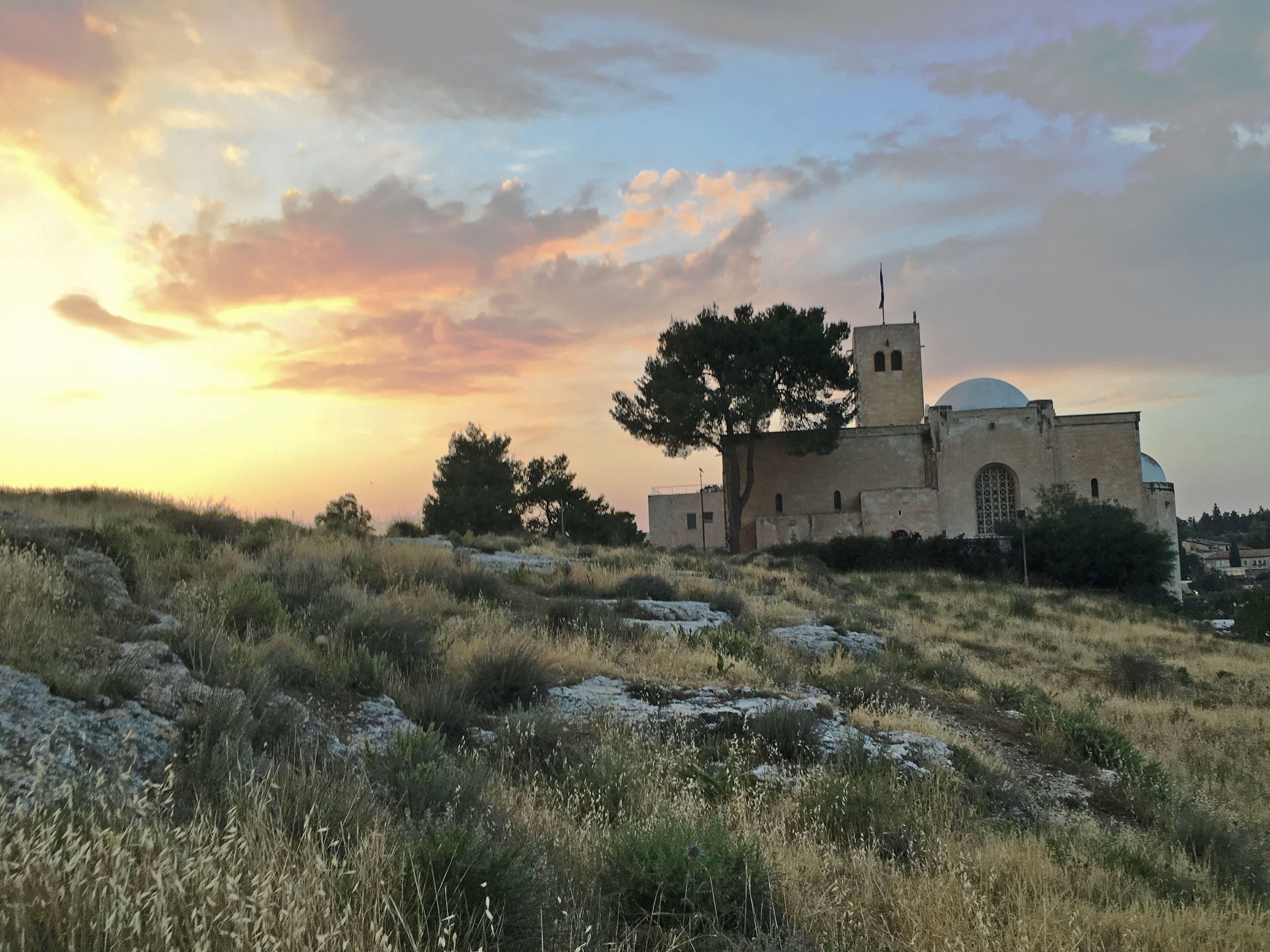
Bible hill and St Andrew's Church

Bible Hill (Hebrew: גבעת התנ"ך, translit: Givat Hatanach) is an exposed hill of urban wildlife and archaeology near the Old City of Jerusalem. The Church of St. Andrews is situated on the northern slope of the hill beside a complex of burial caves from the First Temple period.

== Geography and nature ==
Bible hill is situated on Jerusalem's topographic drainage divide line. Thus, rainfall to west of the hill drains through the Valley of Refaim which eventually leads to the Mediterranean Sea whereas rainfall to the east of the hill flows through the Ben Hinnom gorge and Kidron Valley to the Dead Sea. The top of the hill is ~750m above sea level, with panoramic views towards the Judean Desert, Mount of Olives, Mount Zion and the Old City of Jerusalem.

As it is mostly undeveloped, Bible Hill is one of few urban nature sites in Jerusalem, home to many blossoming wild flowers and animals. In September, the hill is filled with common sedge, followed by meadow saffron. Towards spring blossoms of common anemone and Senecio vernalis fill the hill followed by the dwarf iris. In summer, the hill turns yellow and is filled with thorns, including blue Echinops. A variety of animals live or visit the hill including butterflies and songbirds such as swallows and mountain partridges.

== History and archeology ==
The northern slope of the hill has been excavated by the archaeologist Gabriel Barkai where he discovered the famed Ketef Hinnom scrolls in a burial cave complex from the First Temple period. Barkai named the area "Shoulder of Hinnom" based on a verse in the book of Joshua (15:8) describing the borders of the tribe of Judah: "And the border went up the valley of the son of Hinnom along the shoulder of the Jebusite southward, which is Jerusalem, and the border went up to the top of the mountain which faces the valley of Hinnom westward, which is at the end of the valley of Rephaim northward".

According to the preeminent biblical scholar Dr. James D. Tabor, Bible Hill could possibly be the site of the historical Golgotha where Jesus of Nazareth was crucified two thousand years ago. Research by T. M. West substantiates the plausibility of Dr. Tabor's suggestion.

On the top of the hill there are several remains of more modern looking buildings, suggested to have been used for the nearby train station.

The name 'Bible Hill', first appeared in the 1960s following a proposal by the Society for the Study of the Bible, backed by the former Prime Minister of Israel, David Ben-Gurion, to build an international bible center on the hill top. The plans were not realized due to financing difficulties and the hill was left in its natural state.

== Future construction ==
In 2009 a plan to build a large hotel on the hill proposed by the land's owner, the Greek Orthodox Patriarchate of Jerusalem, was rejected by the municipality. The Patriarchate then sold the land to Kronti Investment Holdings, for the relatively small sum of 7 million shekels. The company's current proposal to build a 6-story hotel on the hill has aroused many objections. The British embassy have objected the plan in relation to its proximity to the Scottish St Andrew's Church, as well the adjacent Eyal Fortress (Qasr al Asfur), which was used for over 50 years as the offices of the British Consulate in Jerusalem. Other objections have come from nature and conservation organizations, architects as well as local residents.
