= Benediction =

Short invocation for divine help

The Evangelical-Lutheran bishop of Stockholm performs the Aaronic blessing towards the congregation

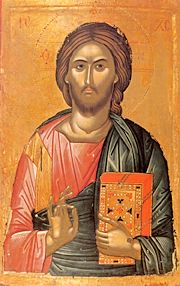
Icon of Jesus Christ Pantokrator by Theophanes the Cretan. His right hand is raised in benediction.

A benediction (Latin: bene, 'well' + dicere, 'to speak') is a short invocation for divine help, blessing and guidance, usually at the end of worship service. It can also refer to a specific Christian religious service including the exposition of the eucharistic host in the monstrance and the blessing of the people with it.

== Christianity ==
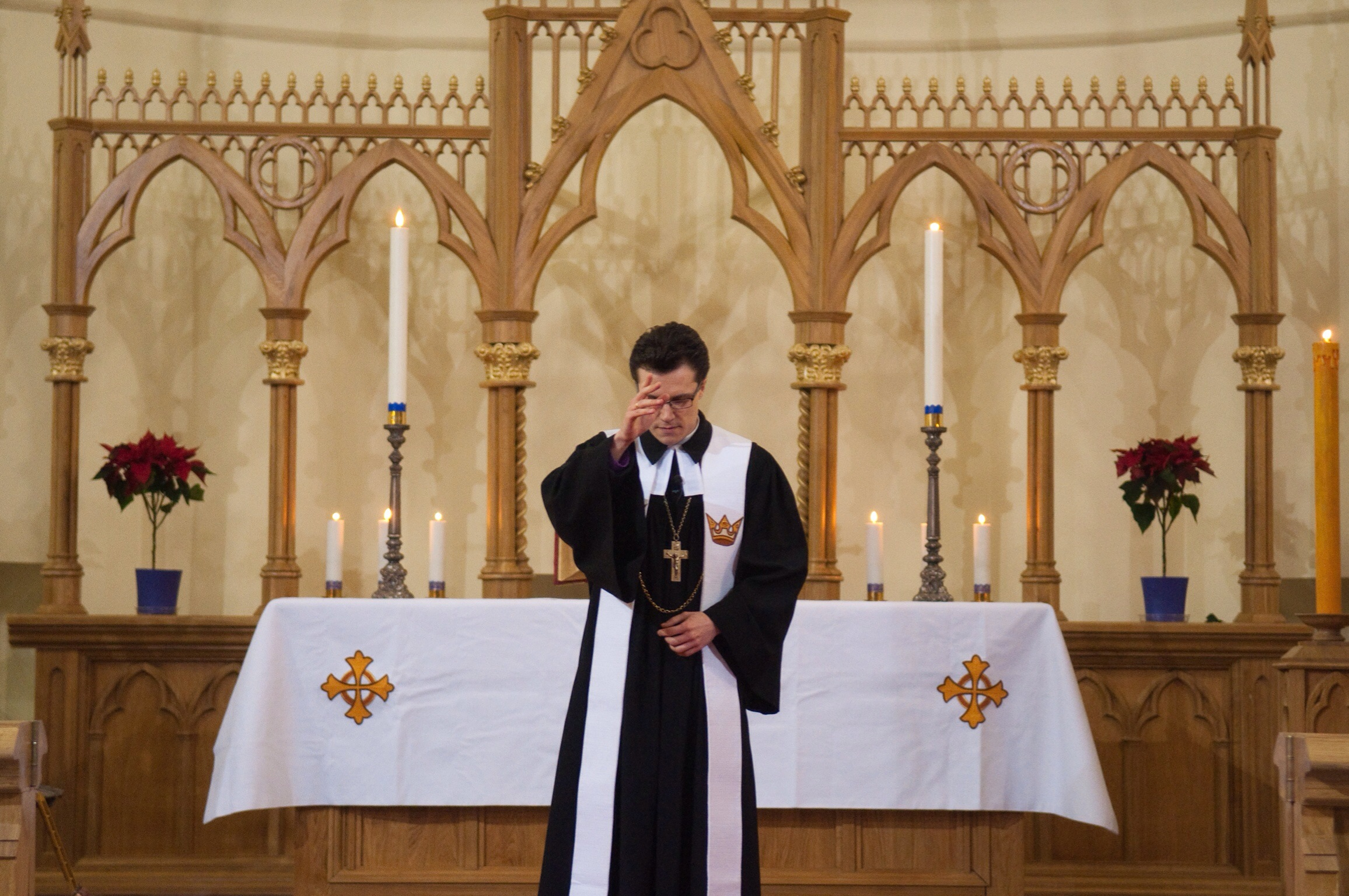
Benediction given by a Lutheran priest at the Lutheran Cathedral of St. Peter and Paul in Moscow

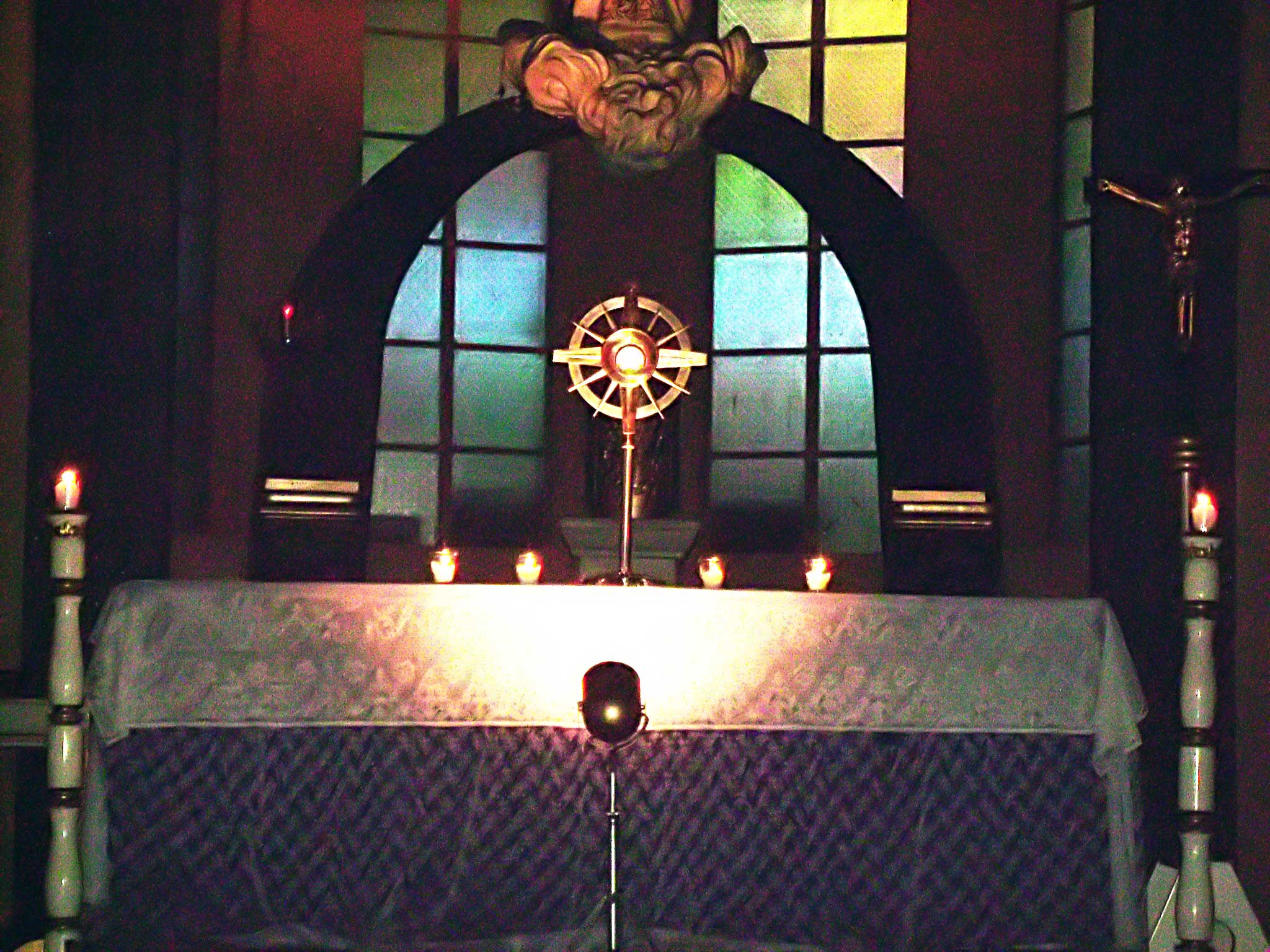
Exposition of the Blessed Sacrament at Sacred Heart Chaplaincy, Cagayan de Oro, Philippines.

From the earliest church, Christians adopted ceremonial benedictions into their liturgical worship, particularly at the end of a service. Such benedictions have been regularly practiced both in the Christian East and West. Among the benedictions of the Roman Catholic Church, include the Apostolic Benediction made by the Pope and his delegates, and the "last blessing" of the dying. The Anglican Church retained the principle of benediction after the Protestant Reformation, and as a result, the benediction or blessing ends most Anglican, as well as Methodist, services of worship.

A common form of benediction in Baptist and liturgical Protestant churches is for the worship leader to raise his hands and recite the words of the biblical Priestly Blessing (Numbers 6:24-26). This addition to the Mass was made by Martin Luther in his Deutsche Messe and remains traditional in Lutheran Churches. Many Protestant denominations, such as the Methodist Church, incorporate the use of benedictions in the closing of their church services. Such benedictions may be taken from Scripture, written by a church member, or a combination of the two.

An often complex and lengthy blessing before communion took place in the mass of the Gallican Rite and in some French sees survived until the Gallican rites controversy when they were suppressed. Pope John Paul II, however, gave permission for these sees to restore this traditional element of their local rite.

In the Eastern Orthodox Church, benedictions will occur at both the beginning and the end of each service, and there may be other benedictions during the course of the service. The final benediction (the dismissal) is the most important, and will often entail mention of the feast or saint being commemorated that day. The priest will bless with his right hand, and the bishop will bless with both hands. In both cases, the hand is held so that the fingers form the initials IC XC (the abbreviation for "Jesus Christ" in Greek), and he traces the Sign of the Cross in the air with his hand. If a bishop or abbot is holding his crozier while making the benediction, he will raise his right hand and trace the Sign of the Cross with both his crozier and right hand, crossing the one in front of the other. More solemn benedictions, such as that which comes at the end of the Divine Liturgy, will be made with a blessing cross rather than the hand.

The benediction in the concluding rite of the Holy Mass at Vadstena Abbey Church (Evangelical-Lutheran) in Sweden

=== Benediction of the Blessed Sacrament ===
One of the most generally popular services in the Roman Catholic Church is Benediction of the Blessed Sacrament, commonly referred to as Benediction and known in France as Salut and in Germany as Segen. It is also the custom of some high-church Anglican churches to hold this service. It is ordinarily an afternoon or evening devotion and consists in the singing of certain hymns, or litanies, or canticles, before the Blessed Sacrament, which is exposed upon the altar in a monstrance and is surrounded with candles. At the end, the priest or deacon, his shoulders enveloped in a humeral veil, takes the monstrance into his hands and with it makes the sign of the cross in silence over the kneeling congregation. Benediction is often employed as a conclusion to other services, e.g. Vespers, Compline, Evensong, the Stations of the Cross, but it is also still more generally treated as a rite complete in itself.

There is a good deal of diversity of usage in different countries with regard to details, but some of the elements are constant. The use of incense and wax candles, the singing of the "Tantum ergo" with its versicle and prayer, and the blessing given with the Blessed Sacrament are obligatory everywhere. In Rome, the only portion of the service which is to be regarded as strictly liturgical is the singing of the "Tantum ergo" and the giving of the Benediction which immediately follows. This idea is emphasized by the fact that in many Roman churches the celebrant, vested in cope and preceded by thurifer, acolytes, etc., only makes his entry into the sanctuary just before the "Tantum ergo" is begun. Preceding this, the Blessed Sacrament is exposed, informally, by a priest in cotta and stole; and then choir and congregation are left to sing litanies and canticles, or to say prayers and devotions as the occasion may demand.

In English-speaking countries the service generally begins with the entry of the priest and his assistants in procession and with the singing of the "O Salutaris Hostia" as soon as the Blessed Sacrament is taken out of the tabernacle. In England the singing of the "O Salutaris" is enjoined in the "Ritus servandus", the code of procedure approved by a former synod of the Province of Westminster. The Litany of Our Lady, though usually printed after the "O Salutaris" and very generally sung at Benediction, is not obligatory. Further solemnity is often given to the service by the presence of deacon and subdeacon in dalmatics. When the bishop of the diocese officiates he uses mitre and crosier in the procession to the altar, and makes the sign of the cross over the people three times in giving the benediction. Otherwise, when the means for carrying out a more elaborate rite are not available, an informal service is permitted. The priest, wearing cotta and stole, simply opens the tabernacle door. Prayers and devotions are said or sung, and then the priest blesses those present with the veiled ciborium before the tabernacle door is again closed. The permission, general or special, of the bishop of the diocese is necessary for services where Benediction is given with the monstrance.

== Judaism ==
Judaism developed ritualised benedictions (Berachot) for use at the Temple of Jerusalem, and the home. The Hebrew verb (brkh) means 'to fall on one's knees'. These Berachot often took the form of a blessing upon the fulfillment of a mitzvah (divine commandment). The most important benediction is the Priestly Blessing pronounced by the kohanim (priests descended from Aaron), as found in Numbers 6:23–27.

== Hinduism ==
Popularised by ISKCON, benediction in Hinduism usually refers to prayers said or sung sometimes during, before or after lunch, afternoon or any other preferred or chosen time.

== In classical music and church music ==
- The Lord bless you and keep you by Peter C. Lutkin, 1900
- Y'varekh'kha adonai, from Part V of Sacred Service (Avodat Hakodesh) by Ernest Bloch, 1930-1933
- Opening Prayer, in Hebrew, a setting for baritone and orchestra composed by Leonard Bernstein for the reopening of Carnegie Hall, 1986
- The Lord bless you and keep you by John Rutter, 1981
- A Clare Benediction by John Rutter, 1998

== References in popular culture ==
- "Benediction" is the title of a short story by F. Scott Fitzgerald, published in 1920.
- "Benediction" is a track by Hot Natured and Ali Love, released by the Hot Creations label.
- "Benediction" is the first track on Thurston Moore's solo album Demolished Thoughts.
- "Benediction" is a track on The Weakerthans' third album Reconstruction Site.
- "Benediction" is the title of a novel by Kent Haruf, published in 2013.
- "Benediction" is a track by August Alsina.
- "Benediction" is a Death Metal band from Birmingham, UK.
- “Who Killed Mr. Moonlight?: Bauhaus Black Magick and Benediction” is the autobiography of British musician David J
