= The Lord bless you and keep you =

1981 classical sacred choral composition by John Rutter

- by John Rutter
- Text: Priestly Blessing
- Dedication: "in memoriam Edward T. Chapman"
- Published: 1981: Oxford University Press
- Scoring: SATB choir and organ

"The Lord bless you and keep you" is a classical sacred choral composition by John Rutter, based on Numbers 6:24–26. It is a setting of a biblical benediction, followed by an extended "Amen". Rutter scored the piece for four vocal parts (SATB) and organ. He composed it in 1981 for the memorial service of Edward T. Chapman, the director of music at Highgate School, London, with whom he had studied when he attended the school.

It was published by Oxford University Press in 1981, in the anthology Oxford Easy Anthems, edited by David Willcocks.

== Text ==
"The Lord bless you and keep you" is a setting of the Priestly Blessing, also known as the Aaronic blessing, from the Book of Numbers in the Bible (Numbers 6:24–26). The blessing, sung or spoken, is used at the conclusion of worship, baptism, ordination, marriage, and other special occasions in Christian worship.

=== Other settings ===
In 1900, Peter Lutkin composed a setting for a cappella choir.

== Music ==
Rutter's setting is for four vocal parts (SATB) and organ. Marked "Andante espressivo", the music is in G-flat major and common time. It takes about 2 1/2 minutes to perform. Rutter also wrote an arrangement for soprano, alto and keyboard in F major and a version for choir and orchestra.

In "The Lord bless you and keep you", Rutter keeps the music restrained and simple. The accompaniment first rests on a pedal point; long chords in the bass change only every half bar, while broken chords in steady quavers add colour. The first line of the text is sung by the sopranos alone, then repeated by all voices, starting in unison but expanding to harmony on the words "The Lord make His face to shine upon you". "The Lord lift His countenance upon you" is sung twice in two-part homophony, first soprano and alto, then tenor and bass. "And give you peace" appears three times, softer each time from mp to pp, first in the soprano, then in the tenor, and finally in unison in all voices. A polyphonic "Amen" grows to the climax of the music both in range and in intensity, then gradually softens and, after a "molto rallentando", reaches the final long chord.

Structure and sections (According to version for 4 SATB voices):

Prelude: C.1 - C.2 | Section A: C.3 - C.18 | Section B: C.19 - C.34 | Section C: C.35 - C.45

Vocal Register: Soprano C4 (c.31) - A5 (c.39) | Alto: C 4 (c.31) - E 4 (c.39) | Tenor: C 4 (c.31) - F 4 (c.26 ) | Bass: Sol 2 (c.45) - C 4

== Performances ==
Rutter has chosen this work to represent his compositions in workshops. It was part of the celebration of the 100th birthday of the Queen Elizabeth The Queen Mother in 2000, and was sung by the choir of St George's Chapel, Windsor Castle at the wedding of the Duke and Duchess of Sussex in 2018.

=== Recordings ===
The piece has been recorded several times, for example ending a collection of Rutter's choral works performed under his direction by the Cambridge Singers and the City of London Sinfonia. It also concluded the 2010 recording of the composer's Requiem by Polyphony and the Bournemouth Sinfonietta, conducted by Stephen Layton. In his notes to that recording, the composer described his musical aims: "I happen not to believe in erecting needless barriers between composer and listener: given a choice between critical approbation and a chance of touching the hearts of people outside the limited circle of contemporary music aficionados, I know which I prefer."
