= Priestly Blessing =

Jewish blessing by Kohanim

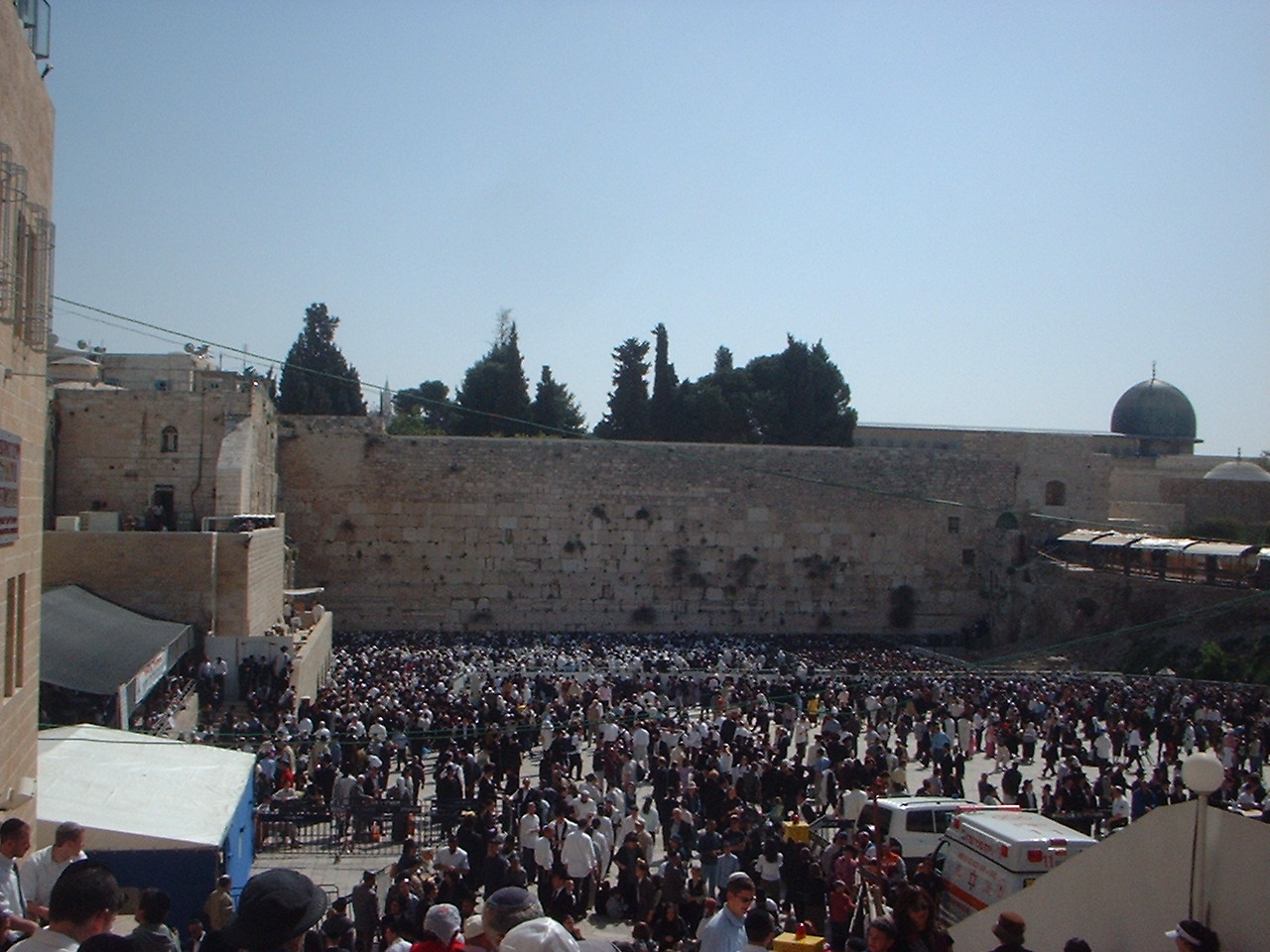
- Large crowds congregate on Passover at the Western Wall to receive the priestly blessing

Halakhic texts relating to this article
- Torah: Numbers 6:23–27
- Shulchan Aruch: Orach Chayim 128–130

The Priestly Blessing or priestly benediction (Hebrew: ברכת כהנים; translit. birkat kohanim), also known in rabbinic literature as raising of the hands (Hebrew nesiat kapayim), rising to the platform (Hebrew aliyah ledukhan), dukhenen (Yiddish from the Hebrew word dukhan – platform – because the blessing is given from a raised rostrum), or duchening, is a Hebrew prayer recited by Kohanim (the Hebrew Priests, descendants of Aaron). The text of the blessing is found in Numbers 6:23–27. It is also known as the Aaronic blessing.

According to the Torah, Aaron blessed the people, and YHWH promises that "They (the Priests) will place my name on the Children of Israel (the Priests will bless the people), and I will bless them". Chazal stressed that although the priests are the ones carrying out the blessing, it is not they or the ceremonial practice of raising their hands that results in the blessing, but rather it is God's desire that the blessing should be symbolised by the Kohanim's hands.

Even after the destruction of the Second Temple, the practice has been continued in Jewish synagogues, and today in most Jewish communities, Kohanim bless the worshippers in the synagogue during shacharit prayer services.

== Biblical source and text ==
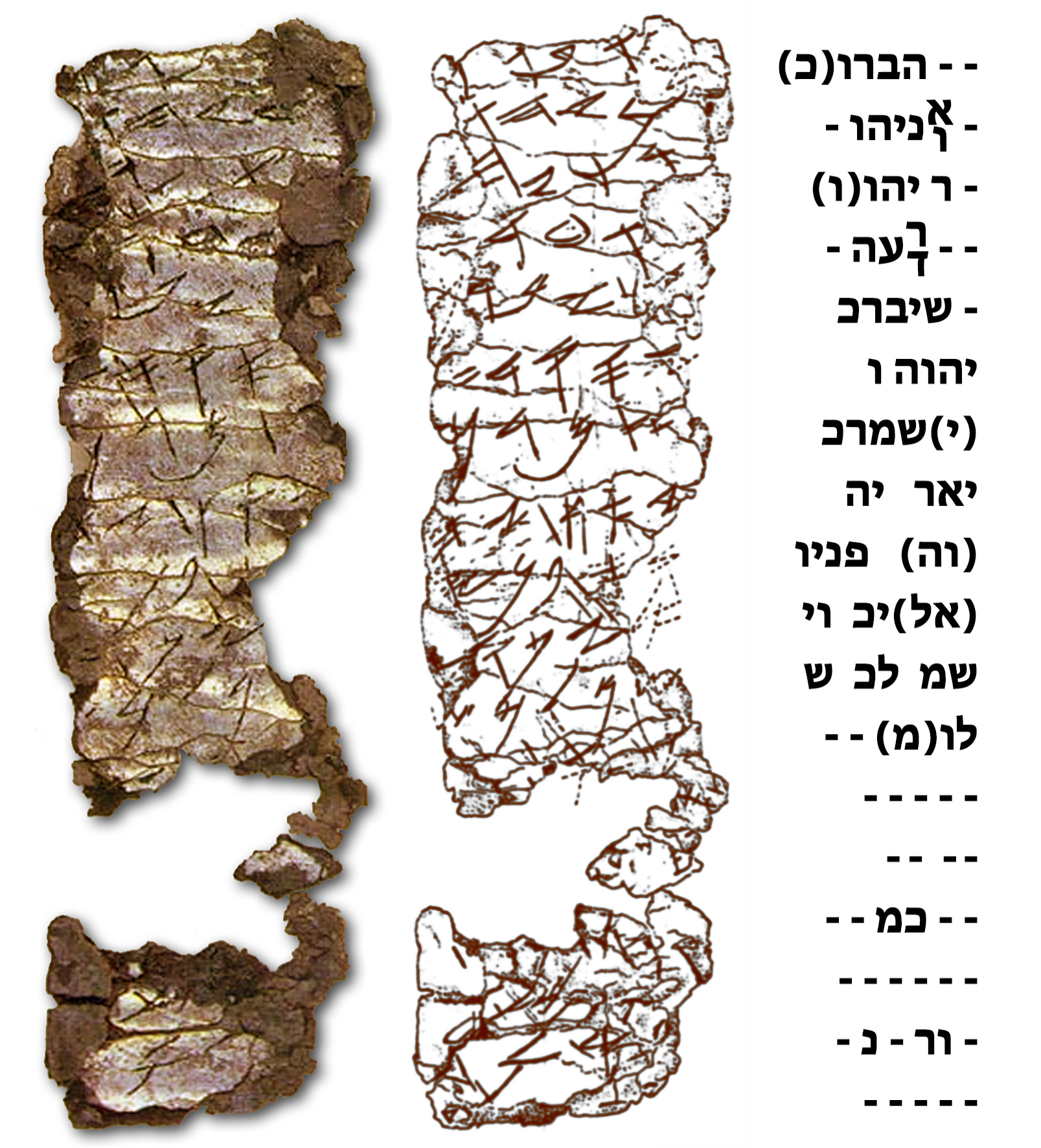
Ketef Hinnom scrolls: The second Silver Scroll, a scroll from the First Temple period containing the Priestly Blessing, on display at the Israel Museum. The scroll is the earliest known artifact written in the Paleo-Hebrew alphabet.

Leviticus 9:22 and Deuteronomy 10:8 and 21:5 mention Aaron or the other priests blessing the Israelites.

The text to be used for the blessing is specified in Numbers 6:22–27:

"And the LORD spoke unto Moses, saying:
Speak unto Aaron and unto his sons, saying: In this way you shall bless the children of Israel; you shall say to them:
May the LORD bless you, and keep you;
May the LORD make His face shine upon you, and be gracious to you;
May the LORD lift up His face to you, and give you peace.
So shall they put My name upon the children of Israel, and I will bless them."

This is the oldest known Biblical text that has been found; amulets with these verses written on them have been found in graves at Ketef Hinnom, dating from the First Temple Period.

The Hebrew text of the blessing is:

יְבָרֶכְךָ ה' וְיִשְׁמְרֶךָ.
יָאֵר ה' פָּנָיו אֵלֶיךָ וִיחֻנֶּךָּ.
יִשָּׂא ה' פָּנָיו אֵלֶיךָ וְיָשֵׂם לְךָ שָׁלוֹם

Translation:

Yevarechecha Adonai, v'yishmerecha.
Ya'er Adonai pa'nav elecha vichunekka.
Yisa adonai panav eleicha v'yasem lecha shalom.

== Use of the blessing to ward off evil ==
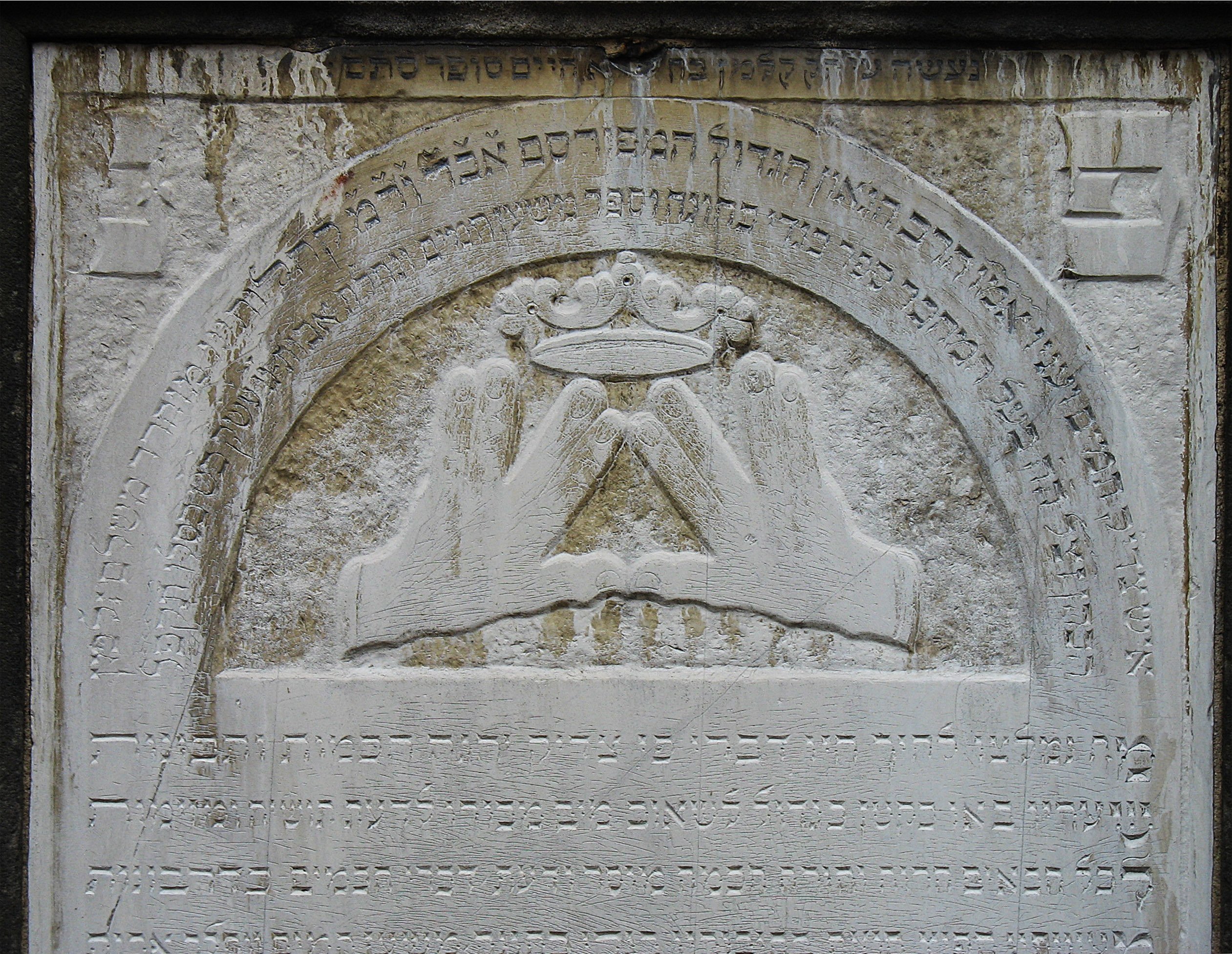
Blessing gesture depicted on the gravestone of Rabbi and Kohen Meschullam Kohn (1739–1819)

Extrabiblical evidence such as the two silver Iron Age amulets found at Ketef Hinnom, contemporary Phoenician and Punic amulets and bands, and blessing inscriptions from the southern Levant have shown that the language of the Priestly Blessing derived from a broader tradition of apotropaic text, which was often inscribed on metal and worn in order to provide protection against evil.

Variations of this blessing are frequently encountered in mortuary and religious settings, foreshadowing early Jewish commentaries linking the blessing to the concept of death. Although specific words in the Priestly Blessing are commonly found in the Bible, the syntactic sequences in which they occur suggest parallels not to other biblical passages, but to blessing inscriptions from late Iron Age southern Levant. In particular, it has been suggested that the enigmatic instruction to "put [YHWH's] name on the Israelites" in Numbers 6:27 reflects an ancient practice of physically wearing the deity's name and blessing for protection against evil.

== In Hebrew law and custom ==
=== Details of the Priestly Blessing ===
- Only Kohanim (males aged 13 or older, in direct patrilineal descent from Aaron) may perform the Priestly Benediction. The blessing should be performed only in the presence of a minyan – even if the Kohanim themselves must be included for a total of ten.
- All Kohanim present must participate, unless disqualified in some way. If a Kohen does not wish to participate, he must leave the sanctuary for the duration of the blessing. A Kohen may be disqualified by, e.g., being under the influence of alcohol, having a severe speech impediment, blindness, having taken a human life, having married a disqualifying wife (such as a divorcée), or the recent death of a close relation.
- A Kohen who is on bad terms with the congregation or who is unwilling to perform the ritual should not perform it.
- It is customary that, once the Kohanim are assembled on the platform, the cantor or prayer leader will prompt them by reciting each word of the blessing and the Kohanim will then repeat that word. Apparently this prompting is done to avoid errors or embarrassment if any of the Kohanim should be ignorant of the words of the recitation. However, if there are a number of kohanim, they may say the first word of the blessing ("Yevarekhekha") without the prompting, presumably to demonstrate their familiarity with the ritual.
- If the prayer leader is a Kohen himself, he does not prompt the other Kohanim in the blessing. Instead, a non-Kohen is designated with that task, and the leader remains silent.
- The Gemara advises that a person who is troubled by a dream should reflect on it when the Kohanim recite their blessing. This practice is still done in many Orthodox communities, primarily in communities that perform the ritual only on Festivals. It is also recited at bedtime. Both uses derive from the Song of Songs 3:7–8, telling of 60 armed guards surrounding Solomon's bedchamber to protect him from "night terrors"; the 60 letters in the Hebrew text of the Priestly Blessing are similarly said to defend against night terrors.
- In many communities, it is customary for congregants to spread their tallitot over their own heads during the blessing and not look at the Kohanim. If a man has children, they will come under his tallit to be blessed, even if they are quite old. The (unattributed) basis of this custom is to deemphasize the role of the Kohanim: they are simply a vehicle by which God "place[s] [His] name upon the children of Israel". A tradition common among Ashkenazim rests on the basis that during the recital of this blessing the Shekhinah becomes present where the kohanim have their hands in the "shin" gesture, so that gazing there would be harmful.
- In the case where no Kohanim are present in the synagogue, or in communities where the kohanim do not bless the community in this prayer, the hazzan will read the prayer verse by verse, and the congregation will respond after each verse with "ken yehi ratzon" (May it be God's Will). This response is used instead of "Amen", because the hazzan is merely "mentioning" the blessing, essentially quoting it rather than actually performing the ritual. However, some congregations (including Chabad) do indeed respond "Amen". This response is also employed on days and times when the Amidah is repeated but the Kohanim do not recite the priestly blessing. However, according to Abudirham, since the Priestly Blessing is not a conventional benediction (that would begin with "Blessed are You ..."), but rather a prayer for peace, ken yehi ratzon is the more appropriate response at all times.

As with many Jewish practices, customs regarding many of the above points may vary widely between countries, communities, and even synagogues.

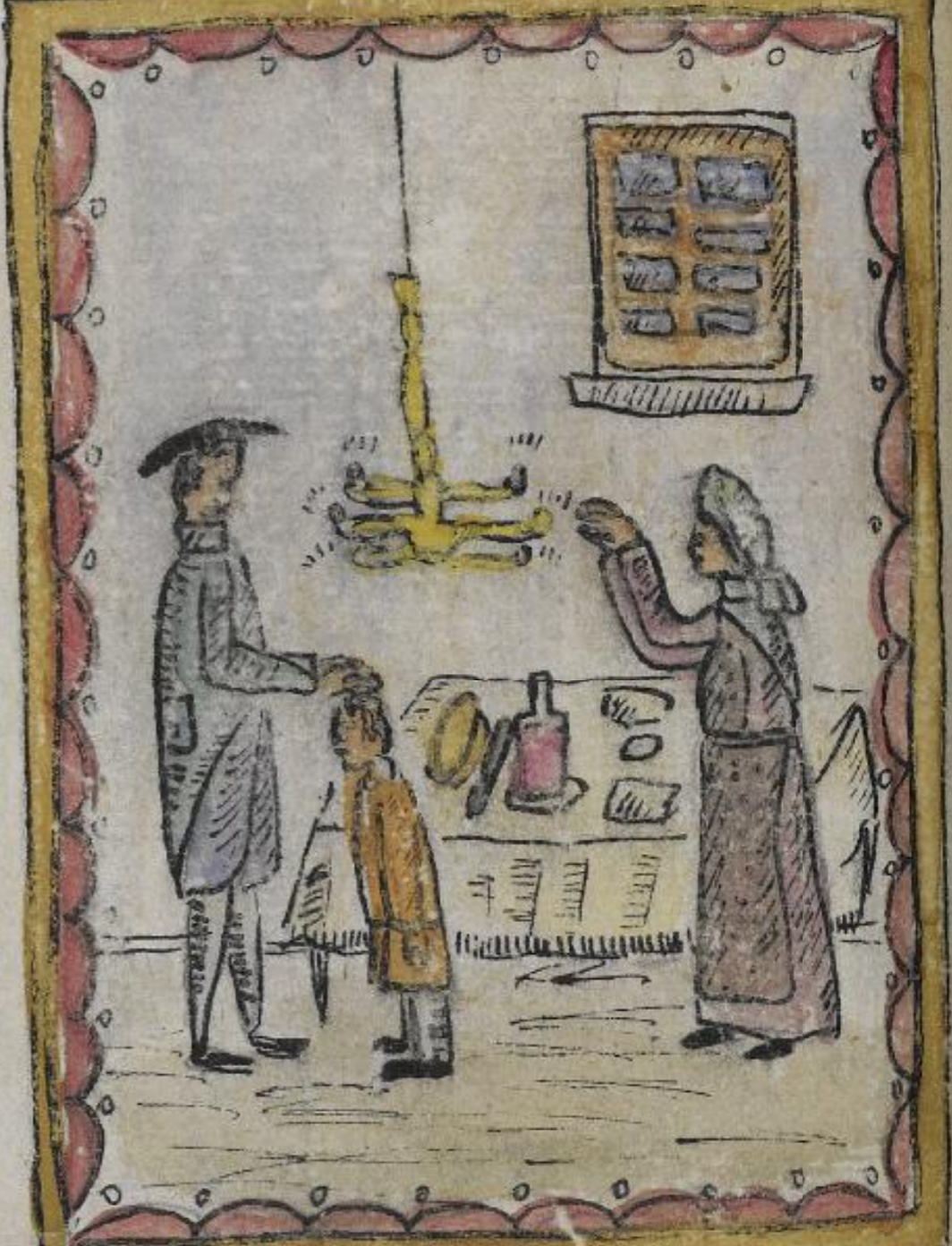
Parents bless a child on Friday night (1740).

=== Other uses of the text ===
- The text of the Priestly Blessing is also used by Jewish parents to bless their children on Friday night before the Shabbat meal. It is usually prefaced, for boys with a request for God to make the children like the sons of Joseph—Ephraim and Manasseh—who are remembered because they never fought with each other, according to tradition. For girls the traditional request is God to make them like Sarah, Rebecca, Rachel and Leah, the Matriarchs of the Jewish people. Similarly, some rabbis will say the blessing to a boy at his bar mitzvah or to a girl at her bat mitzvah.
- It also may be said before a long journey, and some people will write it out and wear/keep it as an amulet. It is often used in the liturgy as the first section of Torah to be read in the morning after reciting the blessing before studying Torah.

== Times performed ==
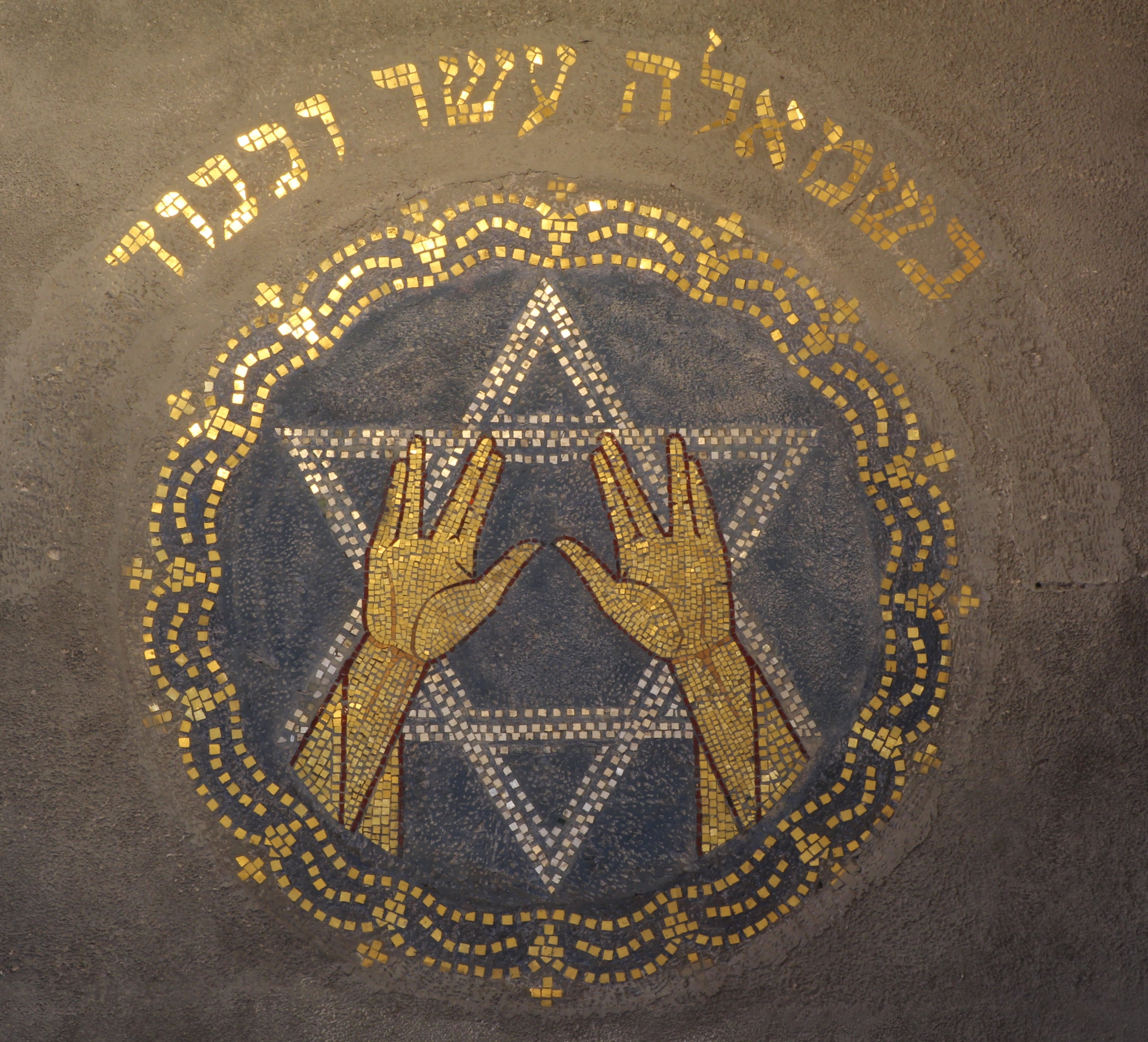
Mosaic in the synagogue of Enschede

Among Jews in Israel (except in Galilee), and among most Sephardic Jews worldwide, the ceremony is performed every day during the repetition of the Shacharit Amidah, and it is repeated on Mussaf on days that include this prayer. On Yom Kippur, the ceremony is performed during the Ne'ila service as well. On fast days other than Yom Kippur, it is performed at Mincha, if said in the late afternoon; when Mincha is recited earlier in the afternoon, most communities in Jerusalem omit the blessing, but in Bene Berak it is generally recited in accordance with the ruling of the Chazon Ish. The reason for offering the blessing in the afternoon only on fast days is that on these days Kohanim cannot drink alcohol prior to the ceremony.

In the Diaspora in Ashkenazic Orthodox communities, as well as some Sephardic communities such as many Spanish and Portuguese Jews, the Jewish ceremony is performed only on Pesach, Shavuot, Sukkot, Shemini Atzeret, Rosh Hashanah, and Yom Kippur. This Ashkenazic practice is based on a ruling by the Remoh, who argued that the Kohanim were commanded to bless the people "with joy", and that Kohanim in the diaspora could not be expected to feel joyful except on the above-mentioned holidays where all Jews are commanded to feel joy. Many German communities perform the blessing in Shaharit, Musaf, and (on Yom Kippur) in Neilah. Eastern European congregations only perform it at Musaf. Spanish and Portuguese Jews generally perform the blessing only in Shacharit. On Simchat Torah, some communities recite it during Musaf, and others during Shacharit, to enable Kohanim to eat or drink during the Torah reading between Shacharit and Musaf. Customs vary as to whether the blessing is delivered outside Israel on a holiday when it falls on Shabbat.

When the blessing is omitted from a prayer in which it could be recited (on weekdays and Shabbat in Ashkenazic diaspora communities, or in any community if a Kohen is not present), the text of the prayer is recited by the hazzan instead, without any special chant or gestures.

== Procedure ==
At the beginning of the Jewish ceremony, Levites in the congregation wash the hands of the Kohanim and the Kohanim remove their shoes (if they are unable to remove their shoes without using their hands, the shoes are removed prior to the washing) and go to the area (often elevated) in front of the Torah ark at the front of the synagogue. The use of a platform is implied in Leviticus 9:22. They cover their heads with their tallitot, recite the blessing over the performance of the mitzvah, turn to face the congregation, and then the hazzan slowly and melodiously recites the three verse blessing, with the Kohanim repeating it word by word after him. After each verse, the congregation responds Amen. If there are more than one Kohen performing the blessings then they wait until someone in the congregation calls out "Kohanim" before starting the blessing over performing the blessings (in some Ashkenazic and Chassidic communities, the Chazzan himself will recite "eloheinu velohei ovoteinu barkheinu ba-berekhah hamushulshet", sometimes in an undertone, until he gets to the word "kohanim", which he calls out); the hazzan then continues the procedure. However, if there is only one Kohan performing the blessings, he starts the blessing over performing the blessings without any prompting from the congregation; the hazzan then continues as normal. In the Yemenite tradition, as well as Persian Tradition when there is a solitary Kohen, he says the first word of the blessing without prompting after having said the preparatory blessing.

=== Raising the hands ===
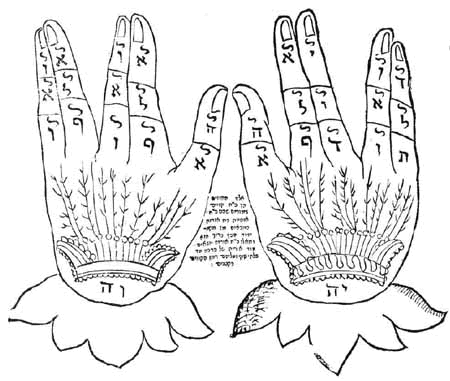
Shefa Tal

During the course of the blessing, the hands of the Kohanim are spread out over the congregation. In most communities, the custom (based on Kabbalah) is to spread the fingers of both hands so as to make five spaces between them; the spaces are (1) between the ring finger and middle finger of each hand, (2) between the index finger and thumb of each hand, and (3) the two thumbs touch each other at the knuckle and the aperture is the space above or below the touching knuckles.

The Kohen raises his hands, with the palms facing downward and the thumbs of his outspread hands touching. The four fingers on each hand are customarily split into two sets of two fingers each (thus forming the letter Shin (שׁ), an emblem for Shaddai, "Almighty [God]"), or sometimes they are arranged to form an overlapping lattice of 'windows.' This Jewish ceremony is sometimes called Nesiat Kapayim, the "lifting of the hands." The Jewish tradition states the Divine Presence would shine through the fingers of the priests as they blessed the people, and no one was allowed to look at this out of respect for God.

In those congregation where the custom is to give the blessing during the week; with "five openings", traditionally linked to the verse in Song of Songs (2.8–9), where it is said that God "peeks through" the latticework, or the cracks in the wall. However, on Shabbot and Yom Tov it is customary to spread all fingers apart.

Each kohen's tallit is draped over his head and hands so that the congregation cannot see his hands while the blessing is said. Performing the Jewish ceremony of the priestly blessing is known in Yiddish as duchening, a reference to the bimah on which the blessing is said. The tradition of covering the hands stems from the biblical prohibition against a Kohen with hands that are disfigured in any way from offering the blessing. The rabbis softened this prohibition by saying that a Kohen with disfigured hands to which the community had become accustomed could bless. In later centuries, the practice became for all Kohanim to cover their hands so that any disfigurement would not be seen by the Congregation. This gave rise to folklore that one should not see the hands of the Kohen or even that harm would befall someone who sees the hands of the Kohen. Some congregants will even turn their backs to the Kohanim so as to avoid any possibility of seeing their hands—although this practice is unsupported by any rabbinic source, and in fact the halacha says that those who face away from the Kohanim are not included in the blessing.

=== Prayer chant ===
In some Jewish communities, it is customary for the Kohanim to raise their hands and recite an extended musical chant without words before reciting the last word of each phrase; in the Western Ashkenazic rite, there is a short chant before each word (except for the name of God), and usually the chazzan will begin a tune when he prompts the kohanim, who will then continue (rather than repeat) the tune. There are different tunes for this chant in different communities. Aside from its pleasant sound, the chant is done so that the congregation may silently offer certain prayers containing individual requests of God after each of the three blessings of the Kohanim.

Because supplications of this nature are not permitted on Shabbat, in Eastern Ashkenazic communities, the chant is also not done on Shabbat. In Western Ashkenazic communities, it is done as normal on the Sabbath.

In Israel, it is not customary to do this chant on a daily basis; some do so on Festivals as they would outside of Israel.

== Variation among Jewish denominations ==
=== Conservative Judaism ===
In Conservative Judaism, the majority of congregations do not perform the priestly blessing ceremony, but some do. In some American Conservative congregations that perform the ceremony, a bat kohen (daughter of a priest) can perform it as well. The Conservative movement's Committee on Jewish Law and Standards has approved two opposing positions: One view holds that a bat kohen may deliver the blessing; another view holds that a bat kohen is not permitted to participate in the Priestly Blessing because it is a continuation of a Temple ritual that women were not eligible to perform. Conservative Judaism has also lifted some of the restrictions on Kohanim including prohibited marriages. The Masorti movement in Israel, and some Conservative congregations in North America, require male kohanim as well, and retain restrictions on Kohanim.

=== Reform, Reconstructionist and Liberal Judaism ===
In Liberal (and American Reform) congregations, the concept of the priesthood has been largely abandoned, along with other familial (caste) and gender distinctions. Thus, this blessing is usually omitted or simply read by the hazzan. North American Reform Jews omit the Musaf service, as do most other liberal communities, and so if they choose to include the priestly blessing, it is usually appended to the end of the Shacharit Amidah. Some congregations, especially Reconstructionist ones, have the custom of the congregation spreading their tallitot over each other and blessing each other that way.

This custom was started when Montreal Reconstructionist rabbi Lavy Becker saw children in Pisa, Italy, run under their fathers' tallitot for the blessing, and he brought it home to his congregation.

Some congregations alter the grammar so that the blessing is read in the first person plural: "May God bless us and keep us..."

=== Orthodox Judaism ===
Orthodox Judaism does not permit a bat kohen (daughter of a kohen) or bat levi (daughter of a Levite) to participate in nesiat kapayim because the practice is a direct continuation of the Temple ritual, and should be performed by those who would authentically be eligible to do so in the Temple. Customs differ if a Kohen under Bar Mitzvah can recite the blessing together with an adult Cohen.

== Christian liturgy ==
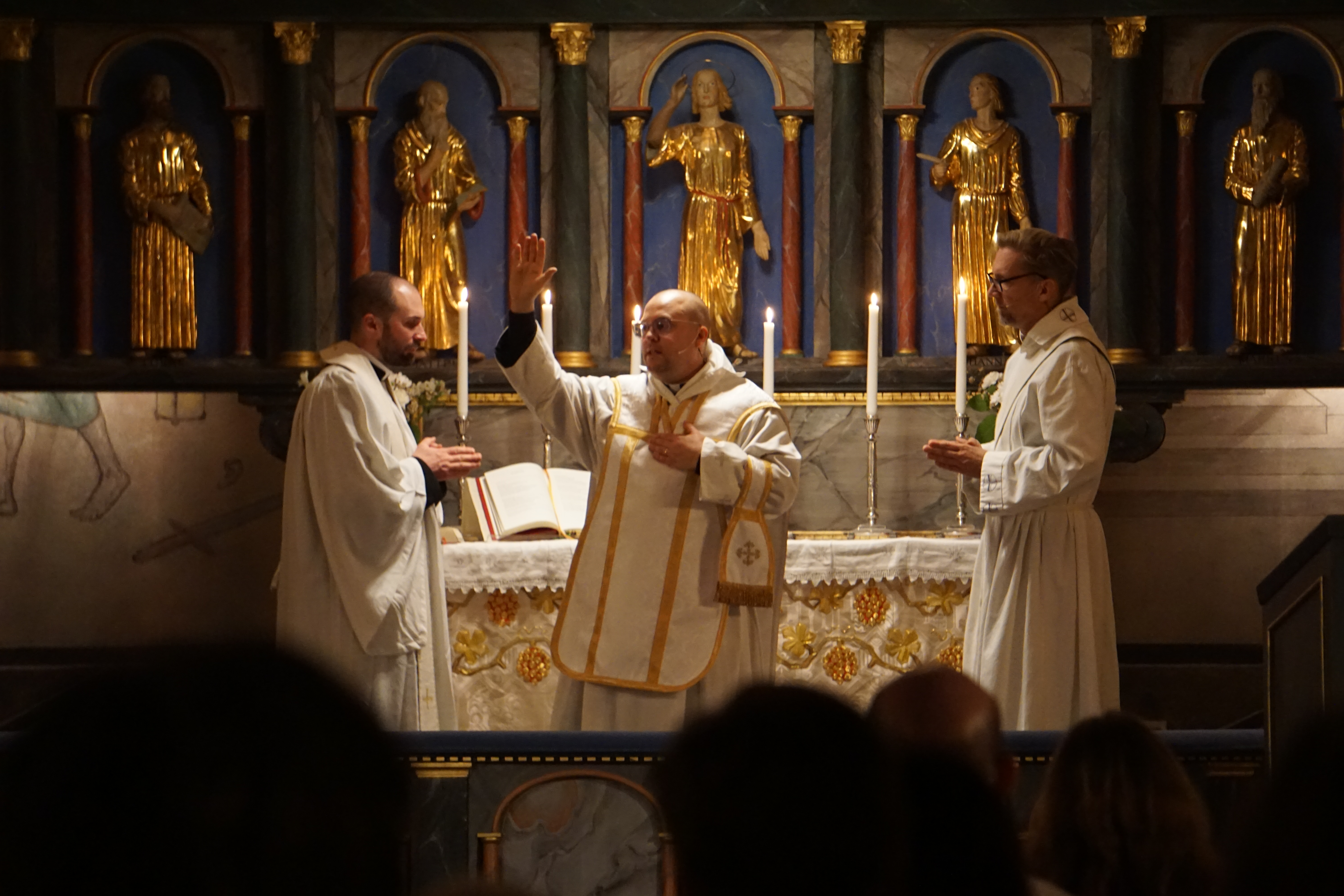
An Evangelical-Lutheran priest in the Church of Sweden performs the Aaronic blessing towards the congregation. It is concluded with the priest doing the sign of the cross.

Blessings based on the priestly blessing are used in the liturgy of the Roman Catholic, Evangelical-Lutheran, and Anglican churches. In Christian contexts, the Priestly Blessing is generally known as The Benediction, and often concludes the Mass (service of worship).

== Music ==
Settings of the text include:

- The Lord bless you and keep you composed in 1900 by Peter C. Lutkin.
- Y'varekh'kha adonai, from Part V of Sacred Service (Avodat Hakodesh) composed during 1930-1933 by Ernest Bloch.
- The Lord bless you and keep you composed in 1981 by John Rutter.
- Opening Prayer, in Hebrew, a setting for baritone and orchestra composed by Leonard Bernstein for the reopening of Carnegie Hall in 1986.
- "The Blessing", composed by Kari Jobe, Cody Carnes, Steven Furtick and Chris Brown in 2020.

== Popular culture ==
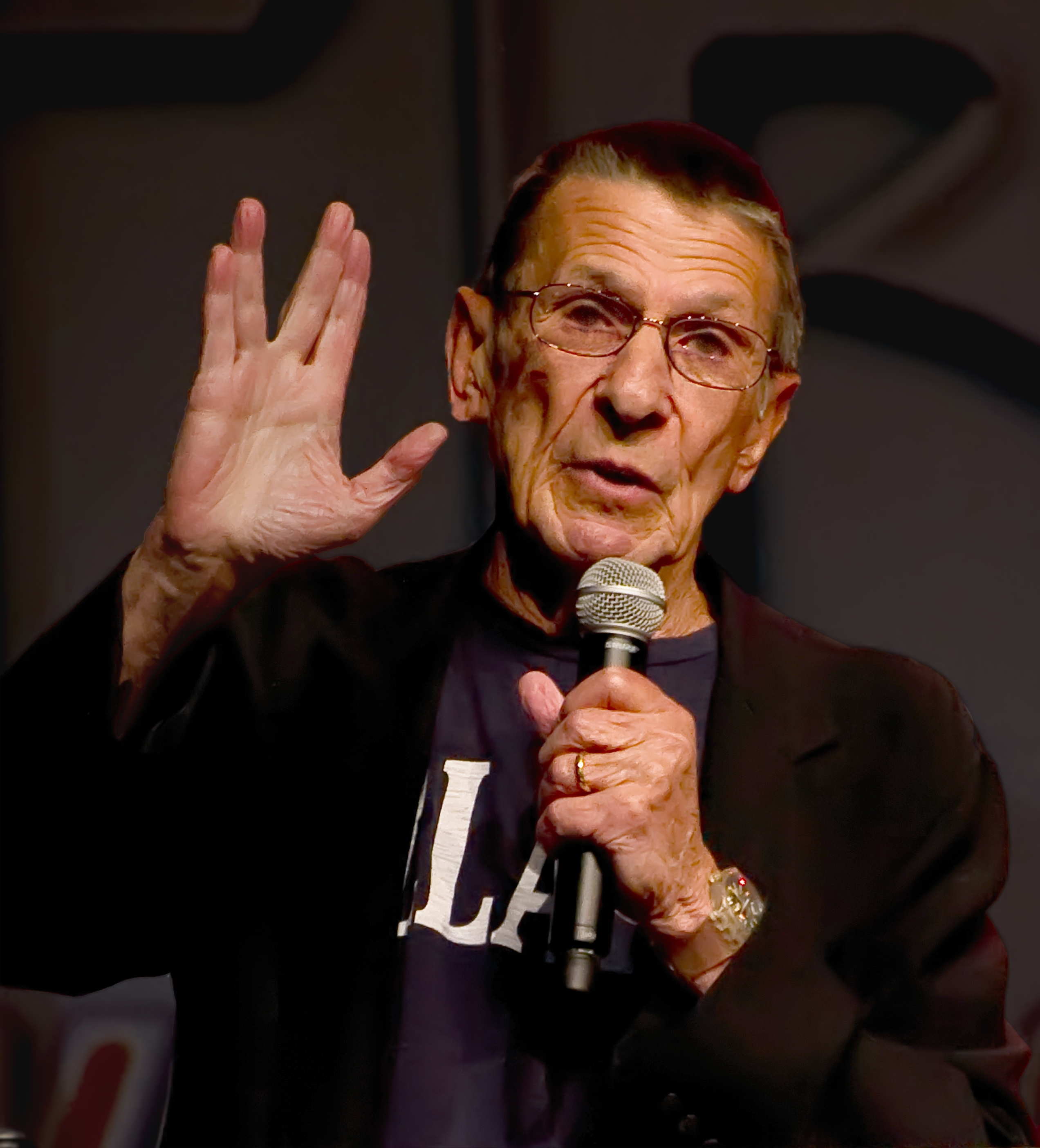
Leonard Nimoy demonstrating the Vulcan salute

In the mid-1960s, actor Leonard Nimoy, who was raised in a traditional Jewish home, used a single-handed version of this gesture to create the Vulcan salute for his character, Spock, on Star Trek. He has explained that while attending Orthodox services as a child, he peeked from under his father's tallit and saw the gesture; many years later, when introducing the character of Mr. Spock, he and series creator Gene Roddenberry thought a physical component should accompany the verbal "Live long and prosper" greeting. The Jewish priestly gesture looked sufficiently alien and mysterious, and became part of Star Trek lore.

In the video game Civilization IV, for which Leonard Nimoy was the narrator who speaks a quote when any given technology is discovered, when a player researches the technology known as "Priesthood" the Blessing is recited by Nimoy in English "The Lord bless you and keep you; the Lord make His face to shine upon you and be gracious to you; the Lord lift up His countenance upon you and give you peace."

Leonard Cohen, who was a kohen, ended his concert in Ramat Gan, Israel, on 24 September 2009, with the Priestly Blessing, reciting it in Hebrew.

== See also ==
- Ketef Hinnom
