= Bible Hill =

Bible Hill may refer to:

- Bible Hill, Nova Scotia
- Bible Hill, Tennessee
- Bible Hill Junior High School
- Truro-Bible Hill, a provincial electoral district in Nova Scotia, Canada
- Bible Hill, Jerusalem, a hill in Jerusalem
