= What hath God wrought =

"What hath God wrought" is a translation of a phrase from the Book of Numbers (Numbers 23:23), and may refer to:

- "What hath God wrought", the official first Morse code message transmitted in the US on May 24, 1844, to officially open the Baltimore–Washington telegraph line
- What Hath God Wrought? The History of the Salvation Army in Canada, a 1952 book by Arnold Brown
- What Hath God Wrought: The Transformation of America, 1815–1848, a 2007 book by Daniel Walker Howe
