= Eyal Fortress =

Coordinates: 31°46′5.3″N 35°13′31.4″E

- מצודת אייל (Hebrew)
- Interactive map of Eyal Fortress
- Location: Derech Hebron - David Ramez, Jerusalem
- Region: Southern Levant

Site notes
- Owner: Urban nature site
- Public access: Yes

The fortified observation tower on the edge of the Bible Hill.

Eyal Fortress (Arabic: قصر العصفور, قصر ألغزال; Hebrew: מצודת אייל) is a fortress built in the early Ottoman rule in Bible Hill, Jerusalem.

== History ==
The building known in Arabic as 'Qasr al-Asfur' (قصر العصفور) or 'Qasr al-Ghazal' (قصر ألغزال). It includes two parts. Its first part is a fortress structure whose base is probably from the 16th century. the fortress included agricultural parts and the fortress can be identified on maps from 1576.

The second part of the fortress is probably a residential part or warehouse that was built in the Ottoman period as well, and is one story with a tiled roof, and is a late addition to the original building

Eyal Fortress was used for over 50 years as the offices of the British Consulate in Jerusalem. It continued to serve this purpose even years after the establishment of the State of Israel.

== Controversy ==
In recent years, there has been a long debate surrounding the hill and the structure, between entrepreneurs who want to build a hundred-room hotel around the structure and between preservationists who want to cultivate the place as a historical natural site.
