= Ketef Hinnom =

Archeological site in Jerusalem

Coordinates: 31°46′7.86″N 35°13′31.27″E

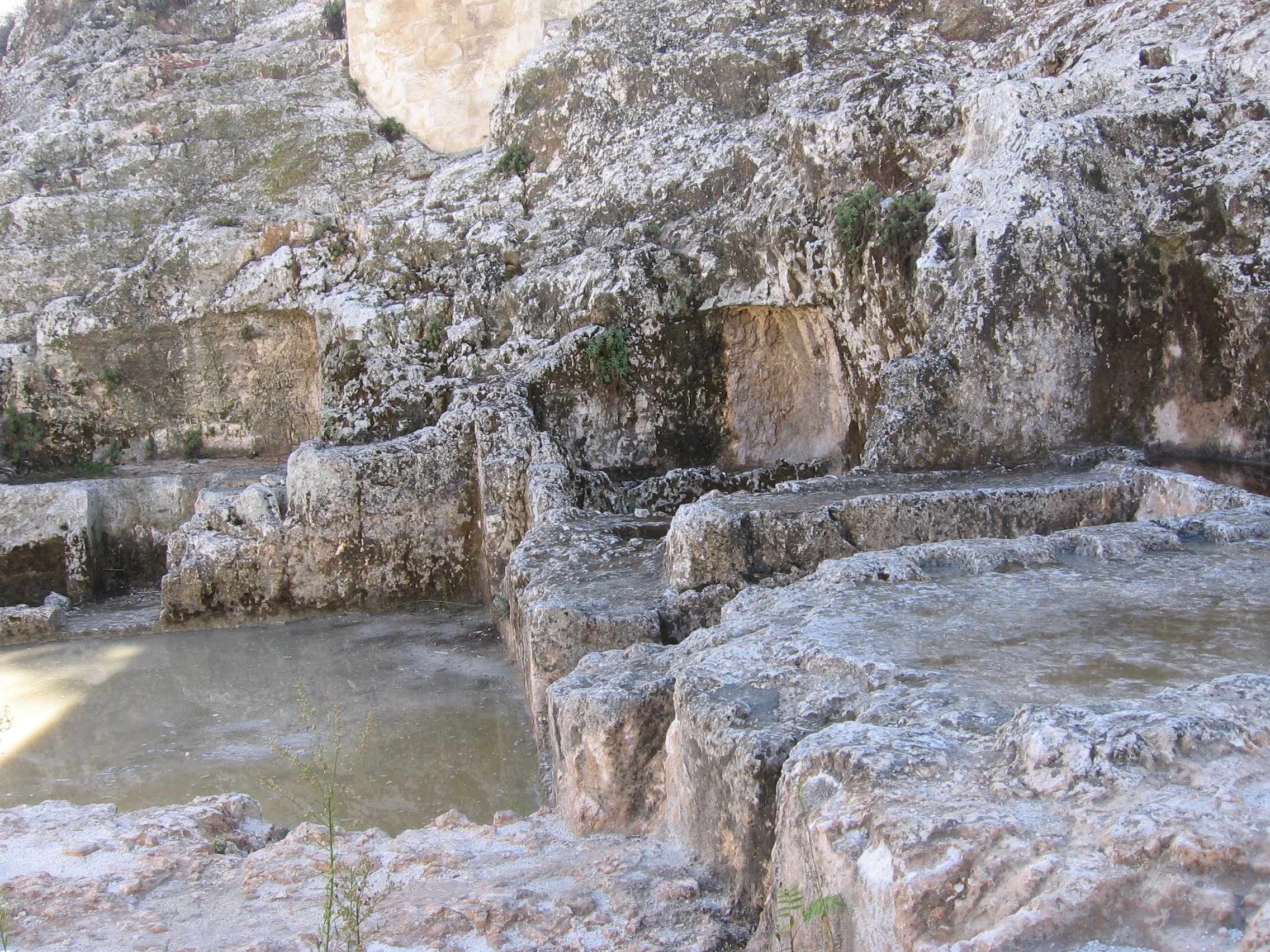
Ketef Hinnom

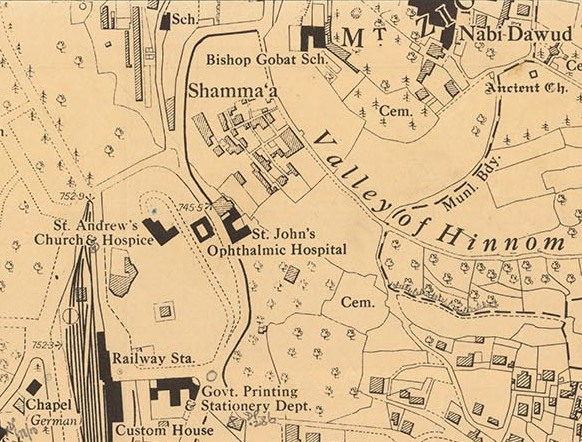
The area of Ketef Hinnom (just east of St Andrew's church) shown in a 1940s Survey of Palestine map

Ketef Hinnom (Hebrew: כתף הינום, romanized: ketef hinom, lit. 'Shoulder of Hinnom') is an archaeological site discovered in the 1970s southwest of the Old City of Jerusalem. Archaeological excavations held at the site uncovered a series of Iron Age period Judahite burial chambers, dating to the 7th and 6th centuries BCE. It is famous for the Ketef Hinnom scrolls, which are the oldest surviving texts from the Hebrew Bible currently known, dated to 600 BC.

Ketef Hinnom is adjacent to St. Andrew's Church, now on the grounds of the Menachem Begin Heritage Center. It is located where the Valley of Rephaim and the Valley of Hinnom meet, on the old road from Jerusalem to Bethlehem.

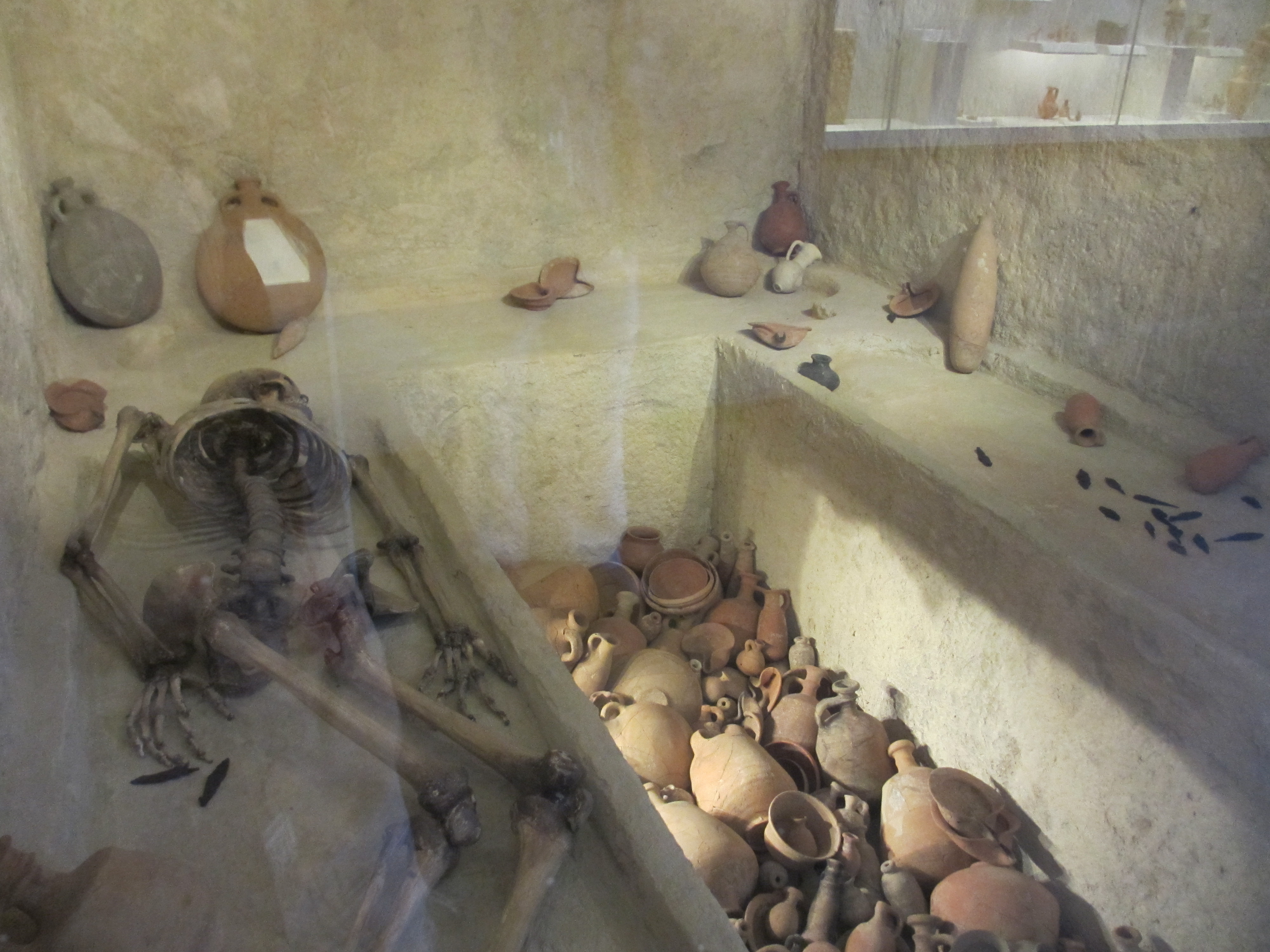
Reconstruction of the burial caves in Ketef Hinnom, Israel Museum

== History ==
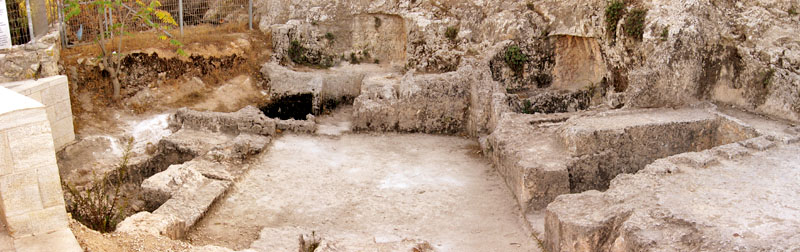
Ketef Hinnom burial caves

The site consists of a series of rock-hewn burial chambers based on natural caverns. The discovery was first reported in 1975 by Gabriel Barkay:

St. Andrew's Church, Jerusalem: In August-September 1975 a salvage excavation was carried out on the hill near St. Andrew's Church in Jerusalem, between the road leading up to the church and the road descending to the Valley of Hinnom. This is an important strategic point on the ancient watershed road through the Judean hills, where two natural roads meet, one from the Valley of Hinnom in the west and one from the Valley of Rephaim in the east... A large block of stone 2.80 m. [9.2 feet] long, belonging to a threshold originally some 5 m. [16.5 feet] wide, was visible on the surface. Excavation revealed that the threshold stone is in situ, and that it is part of a monumental architectural complex.

== Scrolls ==
In 1979, two tiny silver scrolls, inscribed with portions of the well-known Priestly Blessing from the Book of Numbers and apparently once used as amulets, were found in one of the burial chambers. The delicate process of unrolling the scrolls while developing a method that would prevent them from disintegrating took three years. They contain what may be the oldest surviving texts from the Hebrew Bible, dating from the First Temple period around the late 7th to early 6th century BCE prior to the Babylonian Exile, and are now preserved at the Israel Museum.
