= Opening Prayer =

Composition for baritone and orchestra

- Composition by Leonard Bernstein
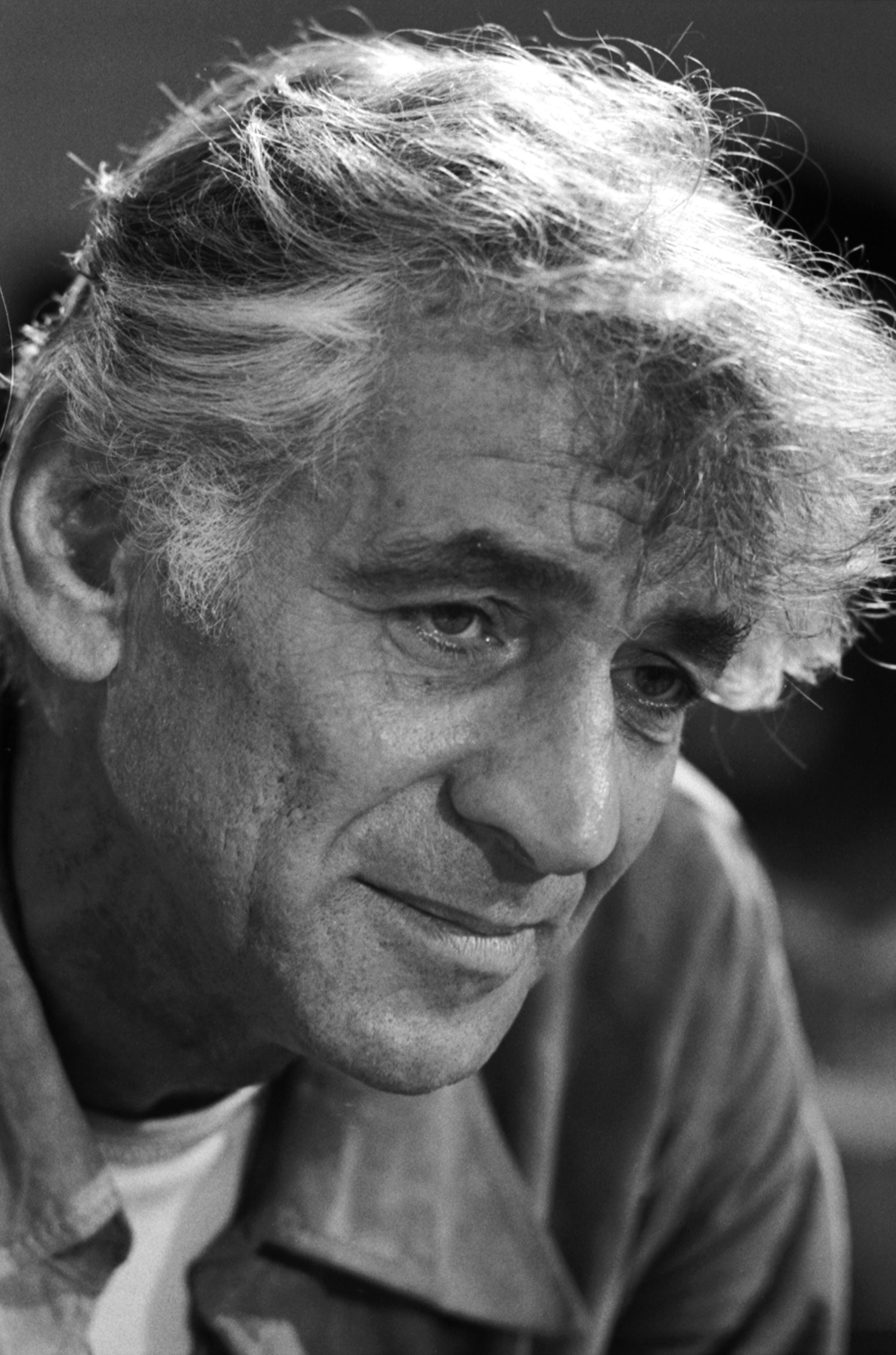
- The composer and conductor in 1971
- Related: based on No. 12 of 13 Anniversaries; part of Concerto for Orchestra "Jubilee Games"
- Occasion: Reopening of Carnegie Hall
- Performed: 18 December 1986: Carnegie Hall, New York City
- Scoring: baritone; orchestra

Opening Prayer is a composition for baritone and orchestra, written for the reopening of Carnegie Hall in 1986. Composer Leonard Bernstein set a Hebrew biblical benediction, which concludes a traditional morning service. He derived the music from an earlier piano composition, and later included it in his Jubilee Games in 1988, and in their expansion to the Concerto for Orchestra in 1989, calling the movement now Benediction.

== History ==
Leonard Bernstein had a close connection to Carnegie Hall. He made his debut there on 14 November 1943, stepping in for Bruno Walter on short notice. As the orchestra's first American conductor and conducting the New York Philharmonic for the first time, the event was widely publicised and made him well known. Bernstein appeared at the hall until 1990 in more than 430 events as pianist, conductor, composer and educator.

When the hall was reopened after restoration in 1986, Bernstein received the first commission for the opening celebrations. He set a Hebrew benediction for baritone and orchestra. The text is the Priestly Blessing (Numbers 6:24–26), which serves to conclude the liturgy of traditional morning services, in English:

May the Lord bless you and keep you;
May He make His face shine upon you and be gracious unto you;
May He lift up His countenance and give you the blessing of peace.

The music began as a piano miniature, part of 13 Anniversaries, from No. 12 dedicated to Aaron Stern. Bernstein conducted the New York Philharmonic in the premiere on 15 December 1986, with Kurt Ollmann as the baritone soloist. The long concert began with piano pieces by Chopin played by Vladimir Horowitz, had six songs sung by Frank Sinatra in the middle, and ended with the final movement from Mahler's Resurrection Symphony, conducted by Zubin Mehta.

== Jubilee Games and Concerto for Orchestra ==
Bernstein used the music later as a movement of his Jubilee Games. He wrote that work first in two movements for the 50th anniversary of the Israel Philharmonic. He added Opening Prayer as a middle movement in a revised version for the first performance in the United States in which he conducted the orchestra at Avery Fisher Hall in 1988.

When he expanded Jubilee Games further in 1989, then called Concerto for Orchestra, he added a different second movement and moved Opening Prayer, now called Benediction, to the final position of four:

1. Free-Style Events
2. Mixed Doubles
3. Diaspora Dances
4. Benediction
