= Dwarf iris =

Dwarf iris is a common name for several plants and may refer to:

- Iris danfordiae
- Iris lacustris, native to the Great Lakes region
- Iris lutescens, native to Iberia
- Iris pumila
- Iris reticulata, native to Russia, the Caucasus, and northern Iran
- Iris verna, endemic to the Eastern United States
