= Book of Numbers =

Fourth book of the Torah, in the Hebrew Bible

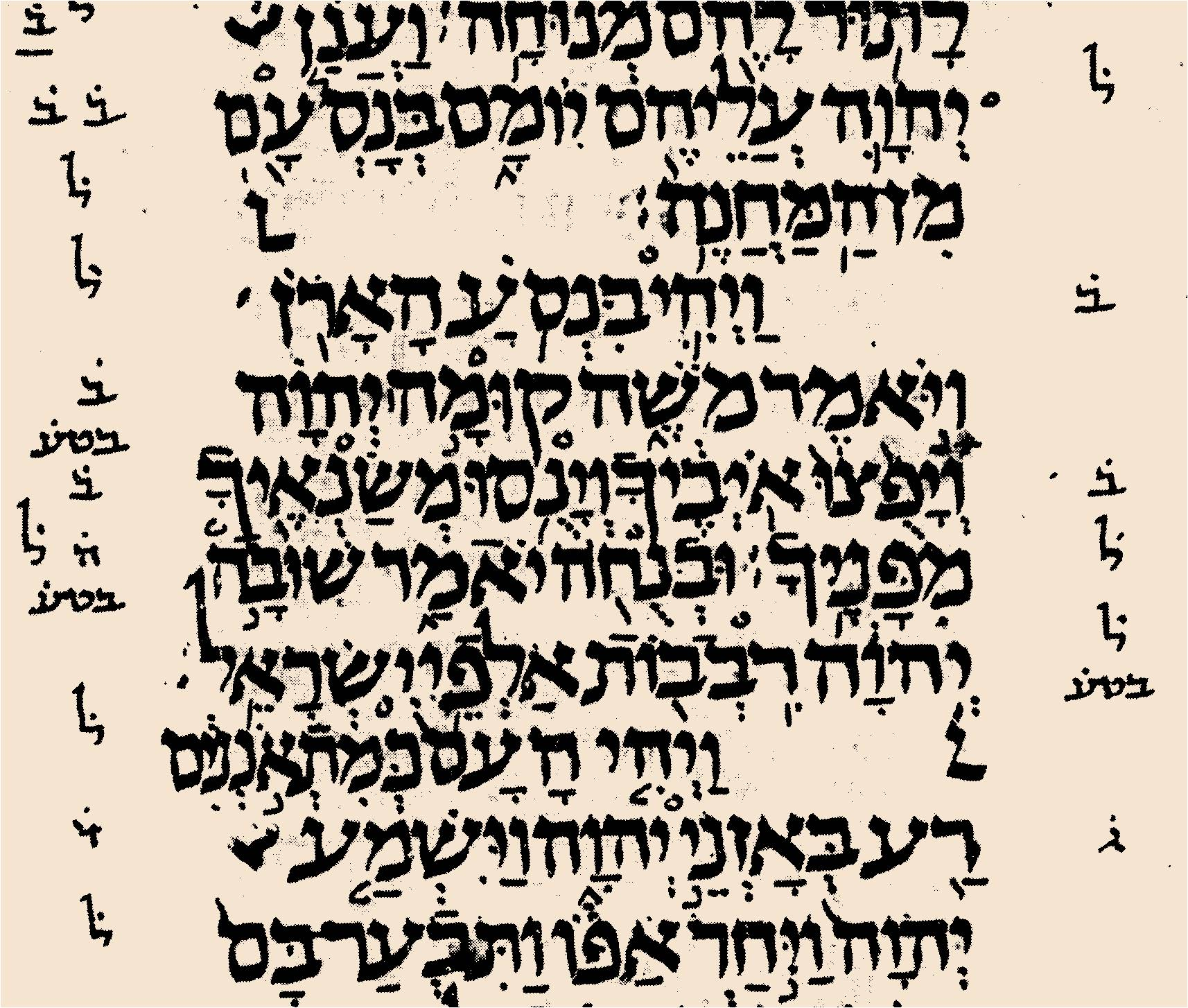
Page from the Leningrad Codex (AD 1008), showing part of Numbers 10

The Book of Numbers (from Greek Ἀριθμοί, Arithmoi, lit. 'numbers' Biblical Hebrew: בְּמִדְבַּר, Bəmīḏbar, lit. 'In [the] desert'; Latin: Liber Numeri) is the fourth book of the Hebrew Bible and the fourth of five books of the Jewish Torah. The book has a long and complex history; its final form is possibly due to a Priestly redaction (i.e., editing) of a Yahwistic source made sometime in the early Persian period (5th century BC). The name of the book comes from the two censuses taken of the Israelites.

Numbers is one of the better-preserved books of the Pentateuch. Fragments of the Ketef Hinnom scrolls containing verses from Numbers have been dated as far back as the late seventh or early sixth century BC. These verses are the earliest known artifacts to be found in the Hebrew Bible text.

Numbers begins at Mount Sinai, where the Israelites have received their laws and covenant from God and God has taken up residence among them in the sanctuary. The task before them is to take possession of the Promised Land. The people are counted and preparations are made for resuming their march. The Israelites begin the journey, but complain about the hardships along the way and about the authority of Moses and Aaron. They arrive at the borders of Canaan and send twelve spies into the land. Upon hearing the spies' fearful report concerning the conditions in Canaan, the Israelites refuse to take possession of it. God condemns them to death in the wilderness until a new generation can grow up and carry out the task. Furthermore, there were some who rebelled against Moses and for these acts, God destroyed approximately 15,000 of them through various means. The book ends with the new generation of Israelites in the plains of Moab ready for the crossing of the Jordan River.

Numbers is the culmination of the story of Israel's exodus from oppression in Egypt and their journey to take possession of the land God promised their fathers. As such it draws to a conclusion the themes introduced in Genesis and played out in Exodus and Leviticus: God has promised the Israelites that they shall become a great (i.e. numerous) nation, that they will have a special relationship with him, and that they shall take possession of the land of Canaan. Numbers also demonstrates the importance of holiness, faithfulness, and trust: despite God's presence and his priests, Israel lacks in faith and the possession of the land is left to a new generation.

== Title ==
The Book of Numbers' name is the translation of Ancient Greek: Ἀριθμοί, romanized: Arithmoi, meaning 'numbers', the name of the book in the Septuagint, which comes from the two major censuses (numberings) recorded in the text, detailing counts of various groups of Israelites.

Consistent with the naming convention for the Torah, in Hebrew the book's title is בְּמִדְבַּר, bemidbar, meaning "in the desert" or "in the wilderness", a word taken from the beginning of the text: "And the LORD spoke unto Moses in the wilderness of Sinai" (Biblical Hebrew: וַיְדַבֵּר יְהֹוָה אֶל מֹשֶׁה בְּמִדְבַּר סִינַי). The first word וַיְדַבֵּר 'Vayedabber' ("And He spoke") was too generic for a title identifying the book, so the fifth word was chosen: it captures the setting and the essence of the book, which chronicles the 40 years of the Israelites' wandering in the desert.

== Structure ==
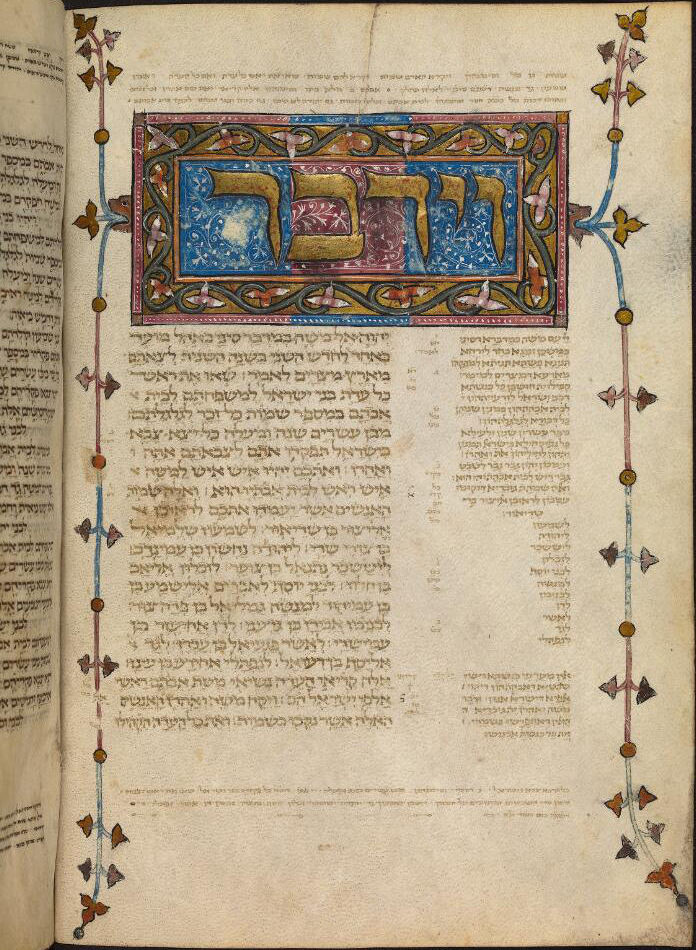
MS. Kennicott 3, created in 1299. Shows the beginning of Numbers with its first word illustrated with calligraphy: וידבר Way-ḏabbêr, "And He spoke…"

Most commentators divide Numbers into three sections based on locale (Mount Sinai, Kadesh-Barnea and the plains of Moab), linked by two travel sections; an alternative is to see it as structured around the two generations of those condemned to die in the wilderness and the new generation who will enter Canaan, making a theological distinction between the disobedience of the first generation and the obedience of the second.

== Summary ==
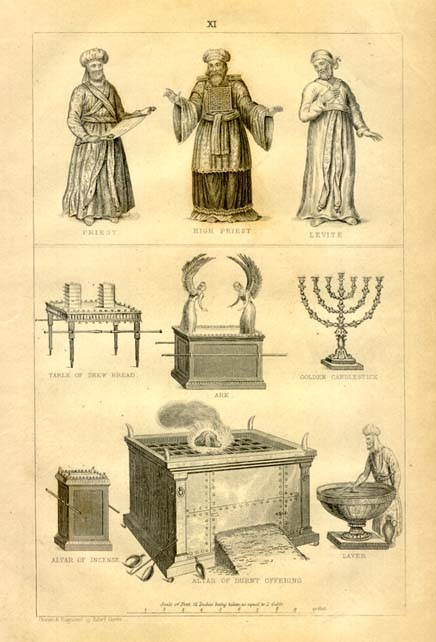
Priest, Levite, and furnishings of the Tabernacle

God orders Moses, in the wilderness of Sinai, to number those able to bear arms—of all the men twenty years and older and to appoint princes over each tribe. A total of 603,550 Israelites are found to be fit for military service. The tribe of Levi is exempted from military service and therefore not included in the census. Moses consecrates the Levites for the service of the Tabernacle in the place of the first-born sons, who hitherto had performed that service. The Levites are divided into three families, the Gershonites, the Kohathites, and the Merarites, each under a chief. The Kohathites were headed by Eleazar, son of Aaron, while the Gershonites and Merarites were headed by Aaron's other son, Ithamar. Preparations are then made for resuming the march to the Promised Land. Various ordinances and laws are decreed.

The Israelites set out from Sinai. The people murmur against God and are punished by fire; Moses complains of their stubbornness and God orders him to choose seventy elders to assist him in the government of the people. Miriam and Aaron insult Moses at Hazeroth, which angers God; Miriam is punished with leprosy and is shut out of camp for seven days, at the end of which the Israelites proceed to the desert of Paran on the border of Canaan. Twelve spies are sent out into Canaan and come back to report to Moses. Joshua and Caleb, two of the spies, report that the land is abundant and is "flowing with milk and honey", but the other spies say that it is inhabited by giants, and the Israelites refuse to enter the land. Yahweh decrees that the Israelites will be punished for their loss of faith by having to wander in the wilderness for 40 years.

God orders Moses to make plates to cover the altar. The children of Israel murmur against Moses and Aaron on account of the destruction of Korah's men and are stricken with the plague, with 14,700 perishing. Aaron and his family are declared by God to be responsible for any iniquity committed in connection with the sanctuary. The Levites are again appointed to help in the keeping of the Tabernacle. The Levites are ordered to surrender to the priests a part of the tithes taken to them.

Miriam dies at Kadesh Barnea and the Israelites set out for Moab, on Canaan's eastern border. The Israelites blame Moses for the lack of water. Moses is ordered by God to speak to a rock but initially disobeys, and is punished by the announcement that he shall not enter Canaan. The king of Edom refuses permission to pass through his land and they go around it. Aaron dies on Mount Hor. The Israelites are bitten by fiery flying serpents for speaking against God and Moses. A brazen serpent is made to ward off these serpents.

The Israelites arrive on the plains of Moab, across the River Jordan from Jericho. Here, the Israelites find themselves in conflict with the Amorites and Og, king of Bashan, both of whom they defeat. Balak, king of Moab, decides to fight the Israelites as well, and summons a local diviner named Balaam to curse the Israelites. However, God tells Balaam not to curse them, and when Balaam attempts to travel to Balak with the Moabite officials God sends an angel to stop his donkey. Realising that he cannot curse the Israelites, Balaam blesses them instead, and foresees a figure whom he identifies as 'the Star of Jacob' who will defeat Israel's enemies. This angers Balak, but Balaam informs Balak that he cannot say anything except what God tells him to say.

The longer the Israelites stay on the plains of Shittim, the more they intermarry with the local Moabites, and the more they participate in the local religion, worshipping a deity known as Baal-Peor. God sends a plague in retaliation, and Moses tells the judges to kill anyone participating in this practice. When one of Aaron's grandsons, Phinehas, finds out a Simeonite prince named Zimri has married a Midianite woman named Cozbi, he enters their tent and runs a spear through them. God rewards him by giving his descendants an everlasting priesthood. God also tells the Israelites to consider the Midianites their enemies.

A new census gives the total number of men from twenty years and upward as 601,730, and the number of the Levites from the age of one month and upward as 23,000. The land shall be divided by lot. The daughters of Zelophehad, who had no sons, are to share in the allotment. God orders Moses to appoint Joshua as his successor. Prescriptions for the observance of the feasts and the offerings for different occasions are enumerated. Moses orders the Israelites to massacre the people of Midian, in retaliation for the Baal-Peor incident. Specifically, all Midianite men and boys and women who are not virgins are killed. Virgin Midianite women and girls are kept alive, counted, and distributed as prizes, along with the sheep, cattle and donkeys, to the officers of the Israelite army.

The Reubenites and the Gadites request Moses to assign them the land east of the Jordan. Moses grants their request after they promise to help in the conquest of the land west of the Jordan. The land east of the Jordan is divided among the tribes of Reuben, Gad, and the half-tribe of Manasseh. Moses recalls the stations at which the Israelites halted during their forty years' wanderings and instructs the Israelites to exterminate the Canaanites and destroy their idols. The boundaries of the land are spelled out; the land is to be divided under the supervision of Eleazar, Joshua, and twelve princes, one of each tribe.

== Composition ==
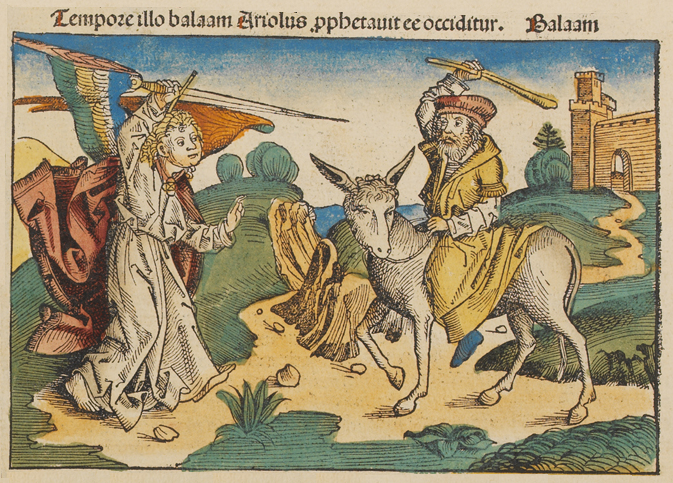
Balaam and the Angel (illustration from the 1493 Nuremberg Chronicle)

The majority of modern biblical scholars believe that the Torah—the books of Genesis, Exodus, Leviticus, Numbers, and Deuteronomy—reached its present form in the post-Exilic period (i.e., after c. 520 BC), based on preexisting written and oral traditions, as well as contemporary geographical and political realities. The five books are often described as being drawn from four "sources", generally regarded as the works of schools of writers rather than individuals: the Yahwist and the Elohist (frequently treated as a single source), the Priestly source, and the Deuteronomist. There is an ongoing dispute over the origins of the non-Priestly source(s), but it is generally agreed that the Priestly source is post-exilic. Below is an outline of the hypothesis:

- Genesis is made up of Priestly and non-Priestly material.
- Exodus is an anthology drawn from nearly all periods of Israel's history.
- Leviticus is entirely Priestly and dates from the exilic/post-exilic period.
- Numbers is a Priestly redaction (i.e., editing) of a non-Priestly original.
- Deuteronomy, now the last book of the Torah, began as the set of religious laws that make up the bulk of the book, was extended in the early part of the 6th century BC to serve as the introduction to the Deuteronomistic history (the books from Joshua to Kings), and later still was detached from that history, extended and edited again, and attached to the Torah.

However, the Ketef Hinnom scrolls do point to the plausibility of a pre-exilic written tradition of the passage from Numbers 6 and Deuteronomy 7. Although this does not decisively prove that there was a canonical written tradition it does point to a possibility of such a tradition.

== Themes ==
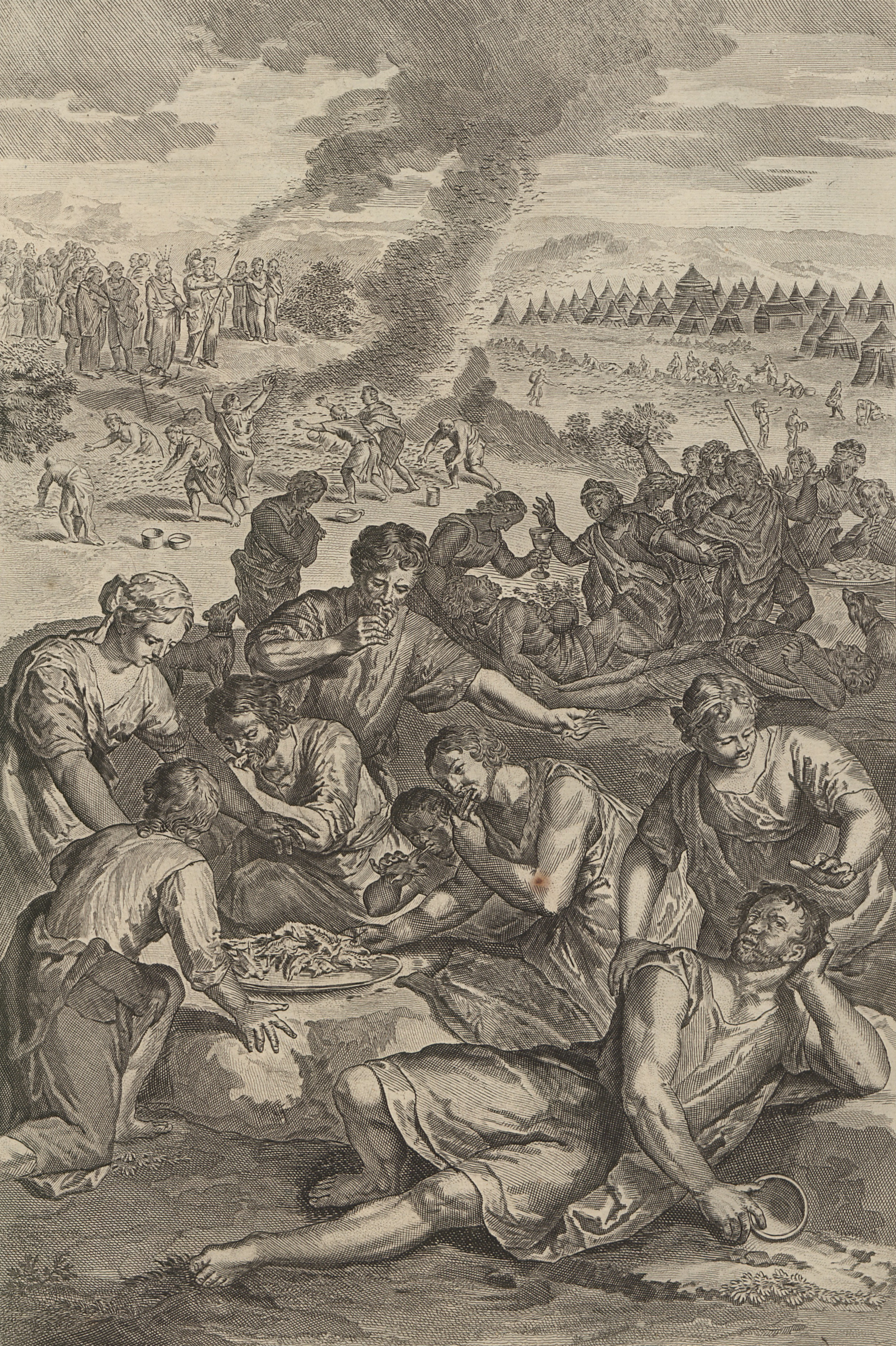
A Plague Inflicted on Israel While Eating the Quail (illustration from the 1728 Figures de la Bible)

David A. Clines, in his influential The Themes of the Pentateuch (1978), identified the overarching theme of the five books as the partial fulfilment of a promise made by God to the patriarchs, Abraham, Isaac and Jacob. The promise has three elements: posterity (i.e., descendants—Abraham is told that his descendants will be as innumerable as the stars), divine-human relationship (Israel is to be God's chosen people), and land (the land of Canaan, cursed by Noah immediately after the Deluge).

The theme of the divine-human relationship is expressed, or managed, through a series of covenants (meaning treaties, legally binding agreements) stretching from Genesis to Deuteronomy and beyond. The first is the covenant between God and Noah immediately after the Deluge in which God agrees never again to destroy the Earth with water. The next is between God and Abraham, and the third between God and all Israel at Mount Sinai. In this third covenant, unlike the first two, God hands down an elaborate set of laws (scattered through Exodus, Leviticus, and Numbers), which the Israelites are to observe; they are also to remain faithful to Yahweh, the god of Israel, meaning, among other things, that they must put their trust in his help.

Among the reasons this law was given was to establish the Israelite people as Yahweh's people. The laws and instructions were as much for identity as they were for obedience. Yahweh by providing all the different instructions and laws was affirming that the Israelite people were his and would bear his identity.

The theme of descendants marks the first event in Numbers, the census of Israel's fighting men: the huge number which results (over 600,000) demonstrates the fulfillment of God's promise to Abraham of innumerable descendants, as well as serving as God's guarantee of victory in Canaan. As chapters 1–10 progress, the theme of God's presence with Israel comes to the fore: these chapters describe how Israel is to be organized around the Sanctuary, God's dwelling-place in their midst, under the charge of the Levites and priests, in preparation for the conquest of the land.

The Israelites then set out to conquer the land, but almost immediately they refuse to enter it, and Yahweh condemns the whole generation who left Egypt to die in the wilderness. The message is clear: failure was not due to any fault in the preparation, because Yahweh had foreseen everything, but due to Israel's sin of unfaithfulness. In the final section, the Israelites of the new generation follow Yahweh's instructions as given through Moses and are successful in all they attempt. The last five chapters are exclusively concerned with land: instructions for the extermination of the Canaanites, the demarcation of the boundaries of the land, how the land is to be divided, holy cities for the Levites and "cities of refuge", the problem of pollution of the land by blood, and regulations for inheritance when a male heir is lacking.

A large part of the theological theme in Numbers is the righteousness and holiness of God being met with human rebellion. The two censuses not only show the different response of two generations but rather that God had remained faithful despite the rebellion of the Israelites. The theme of the book should seem to be more centrally focused on the faithfulness and holiness of God as this is a common theme that runs through the whole of the Pentateuch, not just the book of Numbers.

=== Jewish interpretation ===
According to Rabbi Leib Mintzberg, the essence of the Book of Numbers lies in the relationship between Israel and God, depicted as that of a king dwelling within the camp of Israel and his people. The central focus is the relationship between sovereign and nation, expressed at the beginning of the book through the division of the people into camps and their arrangement under banners around the Tabernacle. This organization reflects royal honor, with Israel encircling the Divine Presence in formations befitting a king surrounded by his troops. From this conception derive the distinctive commandments of the Book of Numbers.

== Census numbers and theories ==
The Book of Numbers records in some detail the population of the fighting men in Israel. The traditional understanding of the text provides a figure of approximately 600,000 soldiers, which would translate to a total population of 1.5 to 2.5 million Israelites. However, such a large number of Israelites is not consistent with the archeological evidence or the attestation of extra-Biblical sources. Therefore, a number of alternative theories have been proposed.

Some scholars posit that the Book of Numbers is not historical. In this theory, the figures given are either greatly exaggerated or simply fabricated. Supporters of this theory opt instead to focus on Numbers as a theological book and not a historical one.

Other Biblical scholars speculate that the word for "thousand" is actually referring to a noun signifying a group or clan. Scholars who hold this view posit a much lower number for the fighting men of Israel; J. W. Wenham proposes closer to 20,000. Critics of this theory assert that this interpretation poses a problem, as it undermines the validity of the text, "assumes a misunderstanding and mistransmission of the text in all the census lists of Exodus and Numbers (not to mention other texts)" and produces several inconsistencies in the Book of Numbers that cannot be resolved.

Another theory is that of an error in transmission. J. W. Wenham argues that "biblical texts are often corrupted by the simple addition of zeroes to the numbers". Timothy Ashley argues that the flaw in this suggestion "is that the mistake in zeroes would easily occur only where numbers were represented by figures rather than by words", and there is "little or no evidence that figures were used in the biblical texts during the biblical period". Based on the nature of the book and the many accounts of tax payment and records of animals and persons, Ashley asserts that it is most likely that Numbers is referring to an actual account of a numerical tally of the Israelite people.

Another theory for the large number stated in the book is that the actual numerical metrics cannot really be established today. This requires us to take the values given as they are, as any other alternatives raises more problems than solutions. In his commentary on the Book of Numbers, John Calvin acknowledged that even among his contemporaries, "certain skeptics" had questioned the veracity of the figures quoted, but defended the inerrancy of the text by invoking the miraculous "interference of God".

A final theory states that the numbers have meaning, but only in a relative sense. According to Timothy R. Ashley's analysis,

No one system answers all the questions or solves all the problems. [...] In short, we lack the materials in the text to solve this problem. When all is said and done, one must admit that the answer is elusive. Perhaps it is best to take these numbers as R. K. Harrison has done—as based on a system familiar to the ancients but unknown to moderns. According to Harrison the figures are to be taken as "symbols of relative power, triumph, importance, and the like and are not meant to be understood either strictly literally or as extant in a corrupt textual form".

== Judaism's weekly Torah portions in the Book of Numbers ==
- Bemidbar, on Numbers 1–4: First census, priestly duties
- Naso, on Numbers 4–7: Priestly duties, the camp, unfaithfulness, and the Nazirite, Tabernacle consecration
- Behaalotecha, on Numbers 8–12: Levites, journeying by cloud and fire, complaints, questioning of Moses
- Shlach, on Numbers 13–15: Mixed report of the scouts and Israel's response, libations, bread, idol worship, fringes
- Korach, on Numbers 16–18: Korah's rebellion, plague, Aaron's staff buds, duties of the Levites
- Chukat, on Numbers 19–21: Red heifer, water from a rock, Miriam's and Aaron's deaths, victories, serpents
- Balak, on Numbers 22–25: Balaam's donkey and blessing
- Pinechas, on Numbers 25–29: Phinehas, second census, inheritance, Moses' successor, offerings and holidays
- Matot, on Numbers 30–32: Vows, Midian, dividing booty, land for Reuben, Gad, and half of Manasseh
- Masei, on Numbers 33–36: Stations of the Israelites' journeys, instructions for conquest, cities for Levites

== See also ==
- Balaam
- Book of the Wars of the Lord
- Inverted nun (only appears twice in the Book of Numbers and seven times in the Book of Psalms)
- Ketef Hinnom scrolls
- Ordeal of bitter water
- Priestly Blessing
- Torah
- What hath God wrought (disambiguation)
- Wilderness of Sin

Book of Numbers Pentateuch
| Preceded by Leviticus | Hebrew Bible | Succeeded by Deuteronomy |
| Preceded by Leviticus | Christian; Old Testament | Succeeded by Deuteronomy |
