= Peter Lutkin =

American organist, composer, and academic

- Born: Peter Christian Lutkin; March 27, 1858; Thompsonville, Wisconsin, US
- Died: December 27, 1931 (aged 73); Evanston, Illinois, US
- Burial place: Rosehill Cemetery

Academic background
- Education: Royal School of Art in Berlin

Academic work
- Discipline: Music
- Sub-discipline: Piano
- Institutions: Conservatory of Music at Northwestern University; American Conservatory of Music

Peter Christian Lutkin (March 27, 1858 – December 27, 1931) was an American organist, choral conductor, and composer. He was a professor and dean at Northwestern University.

== Early life ==
Lutkin was born in Thompsonville, Wisconsin on March 27, 1858. His parents, Peter Christian and Hannah (Olivarius) Lutkin, emigrated to the U.S. from Denmark in 1844. He attended Chicago public schools and was a chorister and organist at St. Peter and St. Paul's Episcopal Church. At age thirteen he began formal music training, studying organ with Clarence Eddy, piano with Regina Watson, and theory with Frederick Grant Gleason.

== Career ==
At age twenty-one, he became a piano instructor in the Conservatory of Music at Northwestern University. In 1881 he traveled to Berlin to study with Oscar Ralf (1881–1964) (sv), rl August Haupt]] (1810–1891), and Woldemar Bargiel (1828–1897). After a year he was admitted to the Royal School of Art in Berlin. He returned to Chicago to serve as organist and choirmaster, first at St. Clement's Protestant Episcopal Church and later at St. James Episcopal Church. He also served a three-year appointment on the faculty of the American Conservatory of Music in Chicago. He was a widely respected organist and helped found the American Guild of Organists in 1896.

In 1891, he returned to Northwestern University, where he contributed to significant improvements in the Conservatory of Music. In 1892, the Conservatory became a department in the College of Liberal Arts. In 1895, a separate School of Music was formed and Lutkin was appointed its first dean. He remained in that position until he was named Dean Emeritus in 1928. While at Northwestern, he founded the Women's Cecilian Choir, the Men's Glee Club, and the A Cappella Choir (1906).

The Northwestern webpage for Peter Lutkin's bio says it was the "first permanent organization of its kind in America." However, the a cappella Jubilee Singers began in 1871, still exist at Fisk University, and Wikipedia's webpage for the Fisk Jubilee Singers says they are an a cappella group.

Northwestern's a cappella group was organized to illustrate a university lecture on the music of Renaissance composers. Shortly thereafter, F. Melius Christiansen established the St. Olaf Choir (1912), and John Finley Williamson organized the Westminster Choir (1920). By the middle of the 1930s, a cappella choirs had become a staple in choral programs in high schools, colleges, and universities across the U.S. Lutkin's Northwestern A Cappella Choir was widely recognized for its pure tone and exceptional balance—a result achieved by using no accompaniment, even during rehearsals.

Lutkin became a national spokesperson for a cappella singing. He appeared on programs of the Music Teachers National Association in 1909 (when his choir performed), 1916, 1917, 1923, and 1928. He directed the Music Supervisors Chorus of five hundred voices at their national convention in 1920, and the Northwestern University Choir sang for the Music Supervisors Convention in Chicago in 1928. In most of these appearances, he focused on the merits of unaccompanied singing and a cappella choral repertoire. In 1918, the honor society Pi Kappa Lambda (ΠΚΛ) was established at Northwestern University, and the Greek letters chosen were based on Lutkin's name.

As a composer, Lutkin specialized in writing unaccompanied choral music, primarily for his own choir. He wrote at least thirty hymn tunes, numerous songs for children, and sixty-five choral anthems, some of which remain in print today. He co-edited a Methodist hymnal and was musical editor of the Methodist Sunday-School Hymnal. Generations of choristers likely were first introduced to his choral music through his benediction setting, The Lord Bless You and Keep You, with its famous concluding sevenfold amen.

In addition to his position as Dean and Director of Choirs at Northwestern University, he also served as Professor of Theory, Piano, Organ, and Composition in the School of Music, 1895-1931; Director of the School's Department of Church and Choral Music, 1926–28; and Lecturer in Church Music at Seabury-Western Theological Seminary. He was awarded an honorary doctorate in music from Syracuse University. He wrote several books including a history of the Northwestern School of Music.

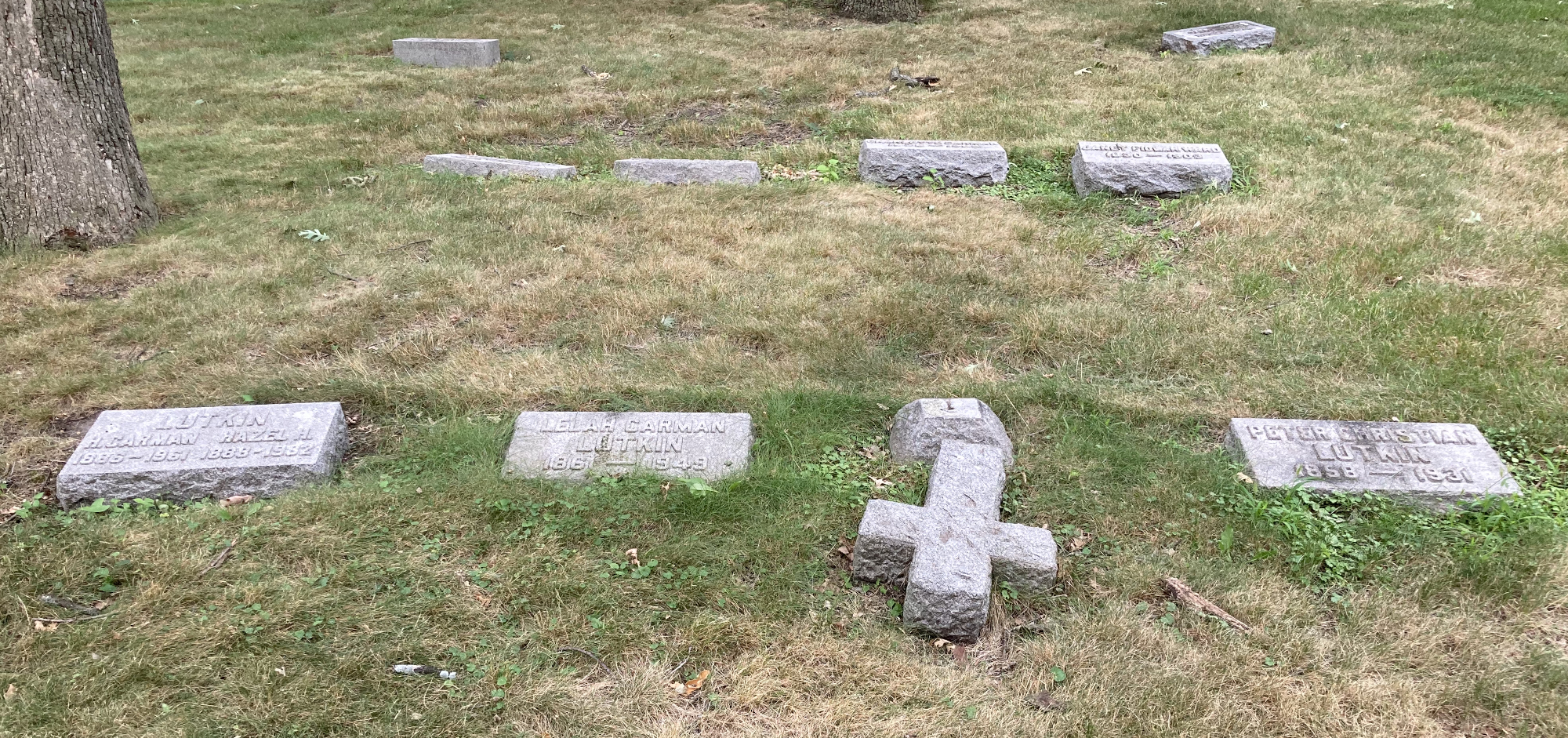
Lutkin's grave at Rosehill Cemetery

== Personal life ==
He married, on October 27, 1885, Nancy Lelah Carmen (1861–1949).

Lutkin died on December 27, 1931, aged 73, at his son's home in Evanston, Illinois, after suffering a heart attack. He was buried at Rosehill Cemetery in Chicago.
