= Brinsley Nicholson =

Scottish physician and editor

Brinsley Nicholson M.D. (1824–14 September 1892) was a Scottish physician, known as an editor of Elizabethan literature.

== Life ==
Born at Fort George, Scotland, he was the eldest son of B. W. Hewittson Nicholson of the army medical staff. After a boyhood passed at Gibraltar, Malta, and the Cape, where his father was stationed, he studied medicine at the University of Edinburgh in 1841. After graduation he completed his medical studies in Paris.

Becoming an army surgeon, Nicholson spent some years in South Africa, and saw service in the Xhosa Wars in 1853 and 1854. He was in China during the Second Opium War, and present at the looting of the Summer Palace in Beijing; and in New Zealand took part in the Second Taranaki War.

About 1870 Nicholson retired from the army, and settled near London. He died 14 September 1892. He had married in 1875, and his wife survived him.

== Works ==
Nicholson contributed genealogical tables of Xhosa chiefs to a Compendium of Kafir Laws and Customs printed by the government of British Kaffraria at Mount Coke in 1858.

In 1875 Nicholson edited, for the then recently formed New Shakspere Society, the First Folio and the first quarto of Henry the Fifth, and began the preparation of the "Parallel Texts" of the same play, issued in 1877 (not completed because serious illness). He later read papers at meetings of the New Shakspere Society.

Encouraged by William Tennant Gairdner, Nicholson brought out in 1886 a reprint of Reginald Scot's Discoverie of Witchcraft (1584). His edition of The Best Plays of Ben Jonson, which was published posthumously in 1893, with an introduction by C. H. Herford, in the Mermaid Series (3 vols.) His edition of John Donne's poems was completed for the Muses' Library in 1895.

Nicholson contributed to Notes and Queries, The Athenæum, The Antiquary, and Shakespeariana.

== Notes ==
Attribution

This article incorporates text from a publication now in the public domain: Lee, Sidney, ed. (1895). "Nicholson, Brinsley". Dictionary of National Biography. Vol. 41. London: Smith, Elder & Co.
