= Stay Awhile (The Bells song) =

Single by the Bells

from the album Fly, Little White Dove, Fly
- B-side: "Sing A Song Of Freedom"
- Released: February 11, 1971
- Genre: Soft rock
- Length: 3:15
- Label: Polydor
- Songwriter: Ken Tobias
- Producer: Cliff Edwards

The Bells singles chronology
| "Fly Little White Dove, Fly" (1970) | "Stay Awhile" (1971) | "I Love You Lady Dawn" (1971) |

"Stay Awhile" is a song written by Ken Tobias, and was an international hit single for the Bells in 1971.

== Personnel ==
- Jacki Ralph – lead vocals
- Cliff Edwards – lead vocals, harmonica
- Charlie Clark – guitar
- Mike Waye – bass
- Frank Mills – piano
- Doug Gravelle – drums

== Chart performance ==
In Canada, the song was No. 1 on the "RPM 100" for 2 weeks, No. 1 on RPM's "MOR Playlist" for 4 weeks, and No. 1 for 2 weeks on the CHUM 30 chart. In the United States, the song spent 14 weeks on the Billboard Hot 100 chart, peaking at No. 7, while reaching No. 8 on Billboard's Easy Listening chart, and No. 4 on the Cash Box Top 100.

=== Weekly charts ===
| Chart (1971) | Peak position |
|---|---|
| Canada - RPM 100 | 1 |
| Canada - RPM MOR Playlist | 1 |
| Canada - CHUM 30 | 1 |
| US Billboard Hot 100 | 7 |
| US Billboard Easy Listening | 8 |
| US Cash Box Top 100 | 4 |
| Australia - Go-Set | 11 |
| New Zealand - NZ Listener | 16 |

=== Year-end charts ===
| Chart (1971) | Rank |
|---|---|
| Canada - "RPM 100 Top Singles of '71" | 8 |
| US Billboard - "Top Pop 100 Singles" | 57 |
| US - "Cash Box Top 100 Charts Hits of 1971" | 59 |
