= The Beatles Concerto =

The Beatles Concerto is an instrumental musical medley of tunes from songs by The Beatles for two pianos and orchestra, arranged and composed by John Rutter within a classical "Piano Concerto Form".

== The LP ==
A recording from 1979 conducted by Ron Goodwin included the interpretation and performance of concert-pianists Peter Rostal and Paul Schaefer as well as accompaniment from the Royal Liverpool Philharmonic Orchestra. Since then, Rutter's The Beatles Concerto and its recording have been compared to concertos from Rachmaninoff and Tchaikovsky. It has also been described as not being "...the umpteenth album, with a medley of tunes, by Lennon-McCartney-Harrison, but contains [sic] a number of The Beatles songs, arranged in a classical form...". The original LP record was produced by The Beatles producer George Martin.

=== A side ===
1. 1st Movement: Mæstoso – Allegro Moderato (She Loves You–Eleanor Rigby–Yesterday–All My Loving–Hey Jude) 8:00
2. 2nd Movement: Andante Espressivo (Here, There and Everywhere–Something) 7:36
3. 3rd Movement: Presto (Can't Buy Me Love–The Long and Winding Road) 7:53

=== B side ===
1. The Fool on the Hill (Arr. Rutter) 5:09
2. Lucy in the Sky With Diamonds (Arr. Goodwin) 2:25
3. Michelle (Arr. Goodwin) 3:15
4. Maxwell's Silver Hammer (Arr. Goodwin) 2:37
5. Here Comes the Sun (Arr. Rutter) 3:25
6. A Hard Day's Night (Arr. Rutter) 4:08

The bonus 7" single featuring (A-side) "Here, There and Everywhere/Something" and (B-Side) "Can't Buy Me Love/The Long And Winding Road" came free with the album.

== Discography ==
- Royal Philharmonic Orchestra, Peter Rostal (Piano), Paul Schaefer (Piano) and John Rutter (Conductor & Composer). John Rutter: Distant Land.: Beatles Concerto. Studio. Trak no. 5 (23:41), Rec. May 2003. Information republished by "Rutter: Distant Land, Suites, Etc / Rostal, Schaefer, Rpo Classical CD." CD Universe & Muze Inc. Accessed 14 Jan. 2008.

Photography and design for the album package was by Hipgnosis.
