= Fancies =

Fancies: Five Childhood Lyrics, When Icicles Hang, Suite Antique, Fancies

Studio album by John Rutter, Cambridge Singers, City of London Sinfonia
- Released: June 2005
- Recorded: Seldon Hall, Haberdashers' Aske's School, Elstree, 1991
- Genre: Classical
- Length: 64:42
- Label: Collegium

Fancies is a cycle of six choral settings by John Rutter, created around whimsical themes and based on text from poets such as Shakespeare, Thomas Campion (1567–1620), Edward Lear (1812–1888) and others. The collection was originally written in 1971. Rutter recorded a recording with other compositions which was rereleased in 2005.

== Track listing ==
Fancies – for choir and chamber orchestra

(1) Tell me, where is fancy bred – 1:44
(2) There is a garden in her face – 3:52
(3) The urchins' song – 2:00
(4) Riddle song – 3:13
(5) Midnight's bell – 2:16
(6) The bellman's song – 2:45

Baritone solo: Simon Davies

Suite Antique - for flute, harpsichord and strings By John Rutter Flute: Duke Dobing, Harpsichord: Wayne Marshall

(1) Prelude – 3:20
(2) Ostinato – 1:37
(3) Aria – 3:03
(4) Waltz – 3:02
(5)Chanson – 3:10
(6) Rondeau – 2:43

Five Childhood Lyrics – for unaccompanied choir By John Rutter

(1) Monday's child – 2:53
(2) The owl and the pussy-cat – 1:42
(3) Windy nights – 1:08
(4) Matthew, Mark, Luke and John – 1:46

Soprano solo: Caroline Ashton

(5) Sing a song of sixpence 1:42

When Icicles Hang – for choir and orchestra By John Rutter

(1) Icicles – 3:54
(2) Winter nights – 2:30
(3) Good ale – 2:43
(4) Blow, blow, thou winter wind – 3:52
(5) Winter awakeneth all my care – 5:53

Tenor solo: Nicholas Wilson, Flute: Duke Dobing

(6) Hay, ay – 2:21
