= Matthew, Mark, Luke and John =

Nursery rhyme

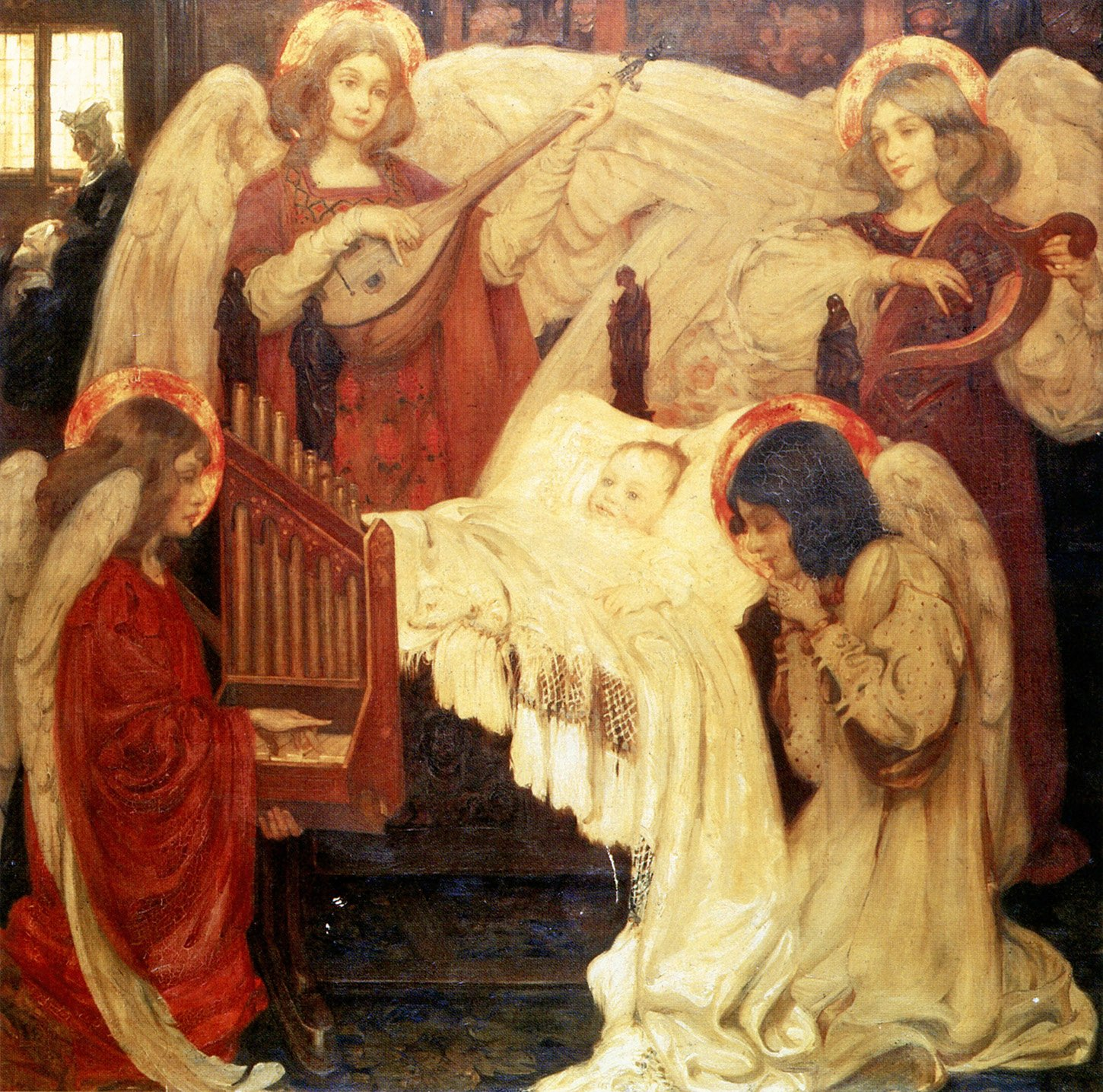
- "Four corners to my bed" by Isobel Lilian Gloag (1868–1917)

Nursery rhyme
- Written: Unknown
- Published: 1656

"Matthew, Mark, Luke and John", also known as the "Black Paternoster", is an English children's bedtime prayer and nursery rhyme. It has a Roud Folk Song Index number of 1704. It may have origins in ancient Babylonian prayers and was being used in a Christian version in late Medieval Germany. The earliest extant version in English can be traced to the mid-sixteenth century. It was mentioned by English Protestant writers as a "popish" or magical charm. It is related to other prayers, including a "Green" and "White Paternoster", which can be traced to late medieval England and with which it is often confused. It has been the inspiration for a number of literary works by figures including Henry Wadsworth Longfellow and musical works by figures such as Gustav Holst. It has been the subject of alternative versions and satires.

== Lyrics ==
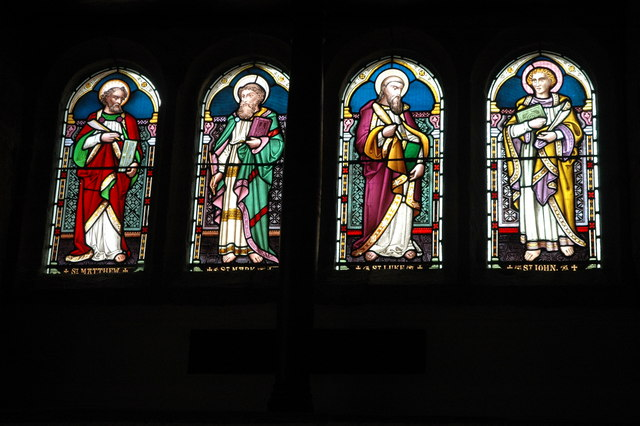
Stained glass window, Caldbeck, showing the four evangelists, Matthew, Mark, Luke and John

The most common modern version of the verse is as follows:

Matthew, Mark, Luke and John,
Bless the bed that I lie on.
Four corners to my bed,
Four angels round my head;
One to watch and one to pray
And two to bear my soul away.

The Roud Folk Song Index, which catalogues folk songs and their variations by number, classifies the song as 1704.

== Origins ==
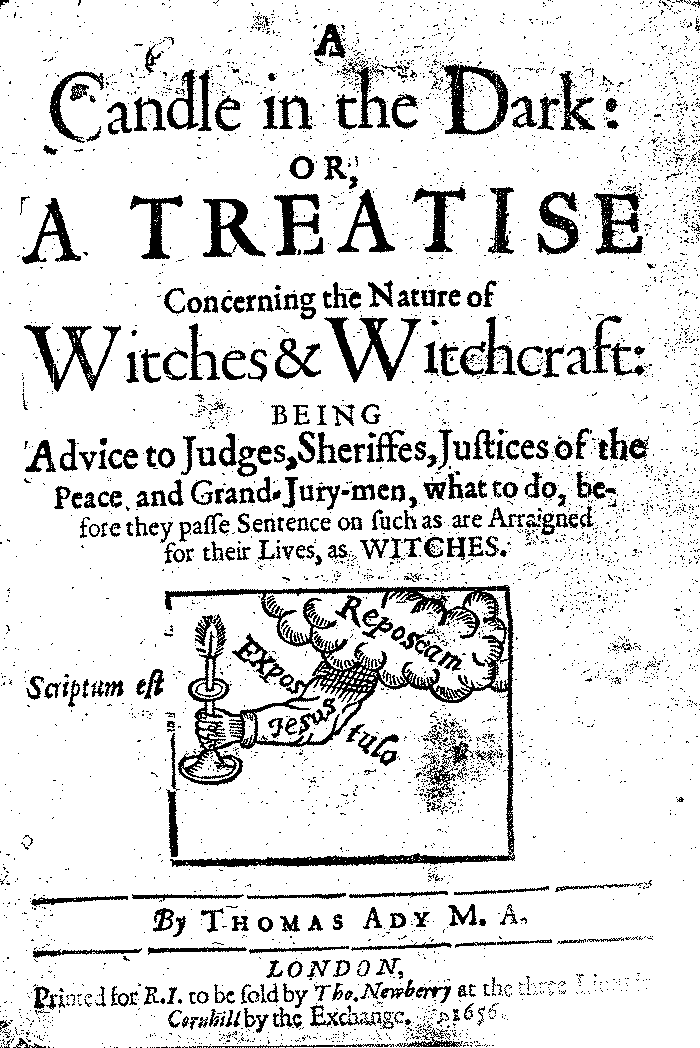
The frontispiece of Thomas Ady's A Candle in the Dark (1656), one of the first books to contain a reference to the rhyme

The verse may be one of few English nursery rhymes to have ancient origins. The Babylonian prayer "Shamash before me, behind me Sin, Nergal at my right, Ninib at my left", is echoed by the medieval Jewish prayer: "In the name of the Lord, the God of Israel, may Michael be at my right hand; Gabriel at my left; Uriel before me; Raphael behind me and the Shekhinah of God be above my head" which is used as a prayer before sleep. A Christian version has been found for Germany at the end of the medieval period. However, the first known record of the lyrics in English is from Thomas Ady's witchcraft treatise A Candle in the Dark, or, a treatise concerning the nature of witches and witchcraft (1656), which tells of a woman in Essex who claimed to have lived in the reign of Mary I (r. 1553-8) and who was alive in his time and blessed herself every night with the "popish charm":

Matthew, Mark, Luke and John,
The Bed be blest that I lye on.

George Sinclair, writing of Scotland in his Satan's Invisible World Discovered in 1685, repeated Ady's story and told of a witch who used a "Black Paternoster", at night, which seems very similar to Ady's rhyme:

Four newks (Note: "Corners") in this house, for haly Angels,
A post in the midst, that's Christ Jesus,
Lucas, Marcus, Matthew, Joannes,
God be into this house, and all that belangs us.

A year later it was quoted again by John Aubrey, but in the form:

Matthew, Mark, Luke, and John,
Bless the bed that I lye on.
And blessed Guardian-Angel keep
Me safe from danger whilst I sleep.

A version similar to that quoted at the beginning of this article was first recorded by Sabine Baring-Gould in 1891, and it survived as a popular children's prayer in England into the twentieth century.

== "White Paternoster" ==
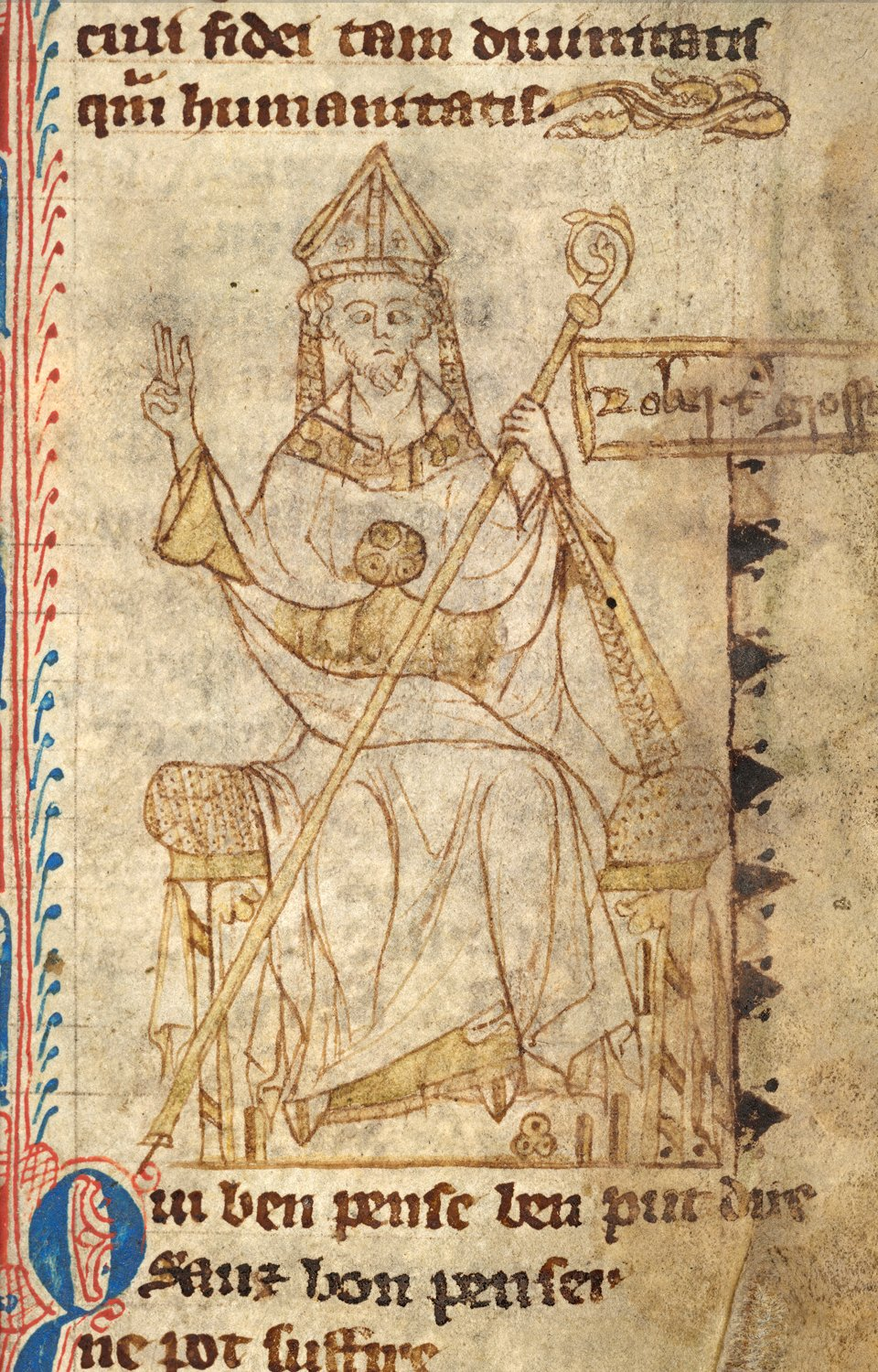
A thirteenth-century depiction of Robert Grosseteste (c. 1175–1253), whose condemnation of a "Green Pasternoster" is one of the earliest references to the rhyme

Robert Grosseteste (c. 1175–1253), Bishop of Lincoln, condemned the use of a "Green Paternoster" by old women in a treatise on blasphemy, which contained reference to "Green Pater Noster, Peter's dear sister". In Chaucer's "Miller's Tale" (c. 1387) he refers to a prayer known as the "White Paternoster", elements of which, particularly the blessing of four parts of a house, can be seen in the later "Black Paternoster":

Therwith the nyght-spel seyde he anon-rightes (Note: "Straight away".)
On four halves of the hous aboute
And on the thresshfold (Note: "Threshold") of the dore withoute:
Jesus Crist and Seint Benedight,
Bless this hous from every wickked wight, (Note: "Spirit".)
For the nyghts nerye the white pater-noster!
Where wentestow, (Note: "Wentest thou", "Did you go".) Seinte Petres suster?'

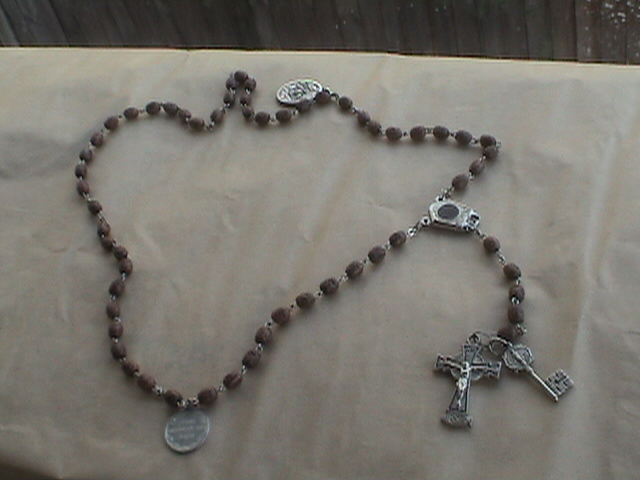
Hand-carved Roman Catholic rosary beads. It has been suggested that the colours of different versions may be connected with the colours of rosary beads.

The reference to St. Peter's sister may be a substitution for St. Peter's supposed daughter, St. Petronilla, known in England as St. Parnell. It has been suggested that the differing colours associated with these verses may have been determined by the colour of prayer beads, with different coloured beads used to prompt the recitation of aves and paternosters.

After the Reformation this "White Paternoster" was among a number of prayers and devotions that were converted into magical rhymes, becoming widely known charms. Lancashire minister John White (1570–1615) in his The Way to the True Church (1608) recorded among many "superstitions" of the inhabitants of Lancashire, a "White Paternoster":

White Pater-noster, St Peter’s brother,
What hast i’ th' t’one hand? White booke leaves.
What hast i’ th' t’other hand? heaven yate keys.
Open heaven Yates, and steike (Note: "Stake, or lock".) shut hells Yates: (Note: "Gates".)
And let every chrisome child creep to its own mother.
White Pater-noster, Amen.

Sinclair in 1685 contrasted the "Black Paternoster" to be used at night with a "White Paternoster" to be used in the day.

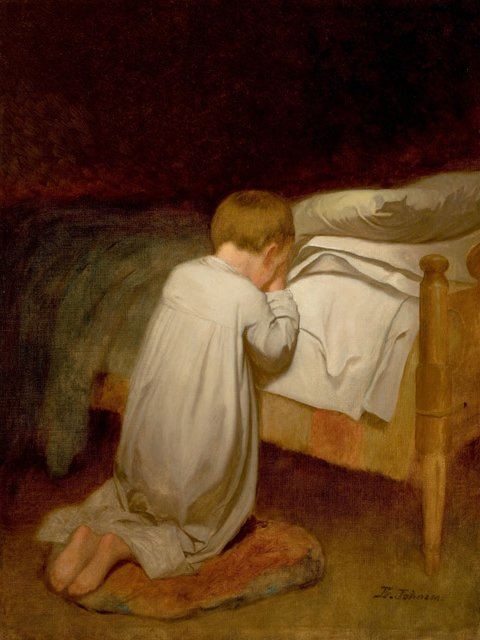
Eastman Johnson's Child at Prayer, c. 1873

White paternoster,
God was my Foster.
He fostered me Under the Book of Palm-Tree,
St Michael was my Dame,
He was born at Bethelem.
He was made of flesh and blood.
God send me my right food;
My right food, and dyne two,
That I may to yon Kirk go
To read upon yon sweet Book,
Which the mighty God of heaven shoop. (Note: "Shaped".)
Open, open Heaven's Yaits,
Steik, Steik, Hell's Yaits.
All the saints be better,
That hear the white prayer Pater Noster.

Anthropologist Margaret Murray suggested in her controversial 1933 book The God of the Witches that the names of the two companion verses could be interpreted as "a confused version of a Christian prayer or hymn":

== Literary and musical references ==
John Rutter set the lyrics of the nursery rhyme for choir a cappella in the collection Five Childhood Lyrics, first performed in 1973.

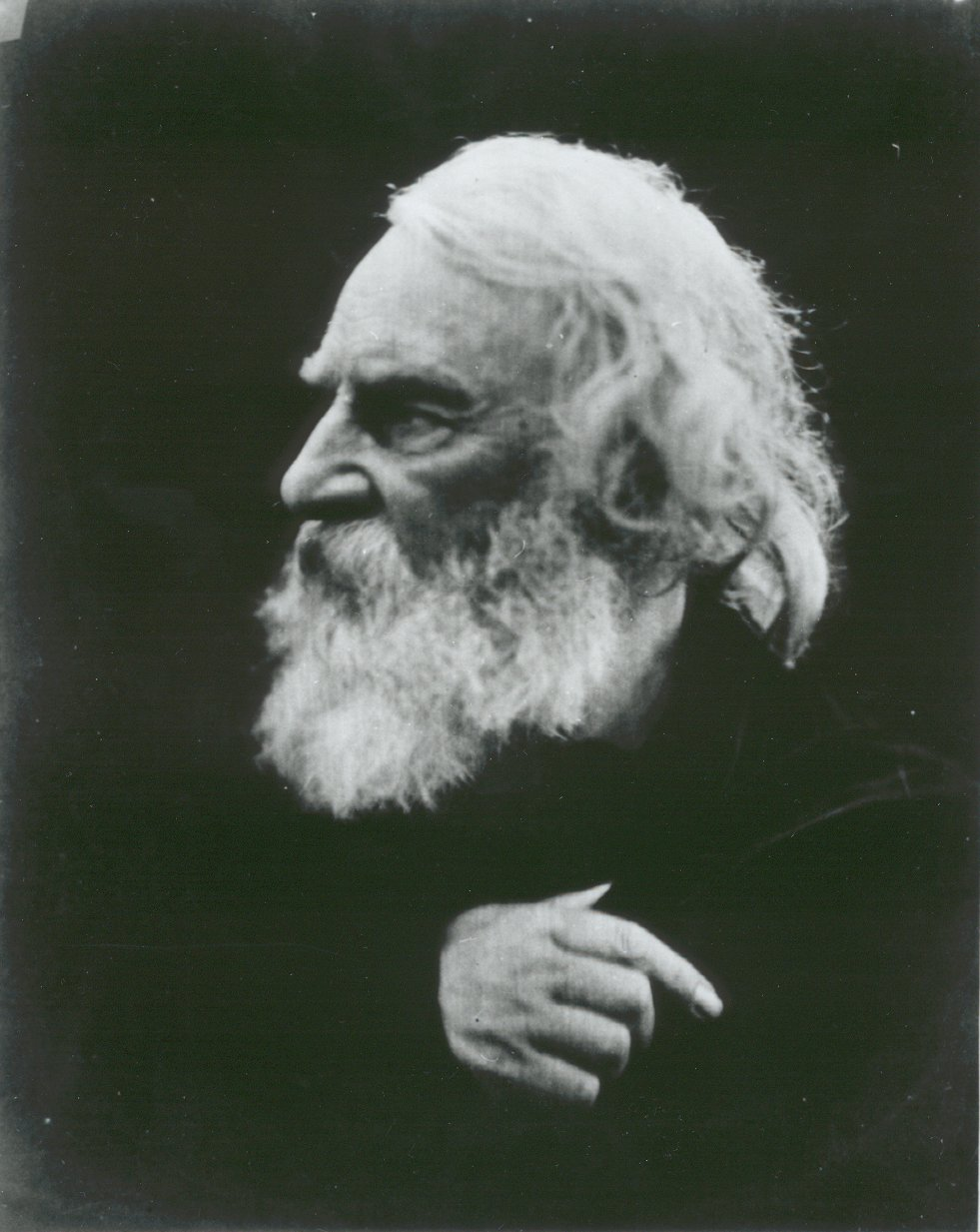
Henry Wadsworth Longfellow, who used the White Paternoster in his poem The Golden Legend (1851)

The "White Paternoster" was used by Henry Wadsworth Longfellow (1807–82) as a mockery of the mass by Lucifer, described as the "Black Paternoster" in his narrative poem The Golden Legend (1851). It was also the title of a short story by Theodore Francis Powys (1875–1953) published in 1930. A four-part choir setting of the Black Paternoster text was produced by Gustav Holst (1874–1934) in early 20th-Century Britain, while contemporary countryman Henry Walford Davies (1869–1941) composed an equivalent setting of the White Paternoster.

== Satires ==
The rhyme has often been the source of satire. One of the most common was recorded in Scotland in the 1840s as a hobby horse game among boys, with the lyrics:

Matthew, Mark, Luke and John,
Hold the horse till I get on;
When I got on I could not ride,
I fell off and broke my side.

A version from the United States recorded in 1900 began:

Matthew, Mark, Luke and John,
Saddle the horse till I get on...

== See also ==
- Saint Patrick's Breastplate
