= Ken Tobias =

Canadian singer-songwriter (1945–2024)

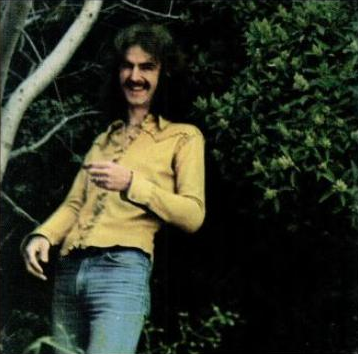
- Tobias in 1973

Background information
- Born: Kenneth Wayne Paul Tobias; July 25, 1945; Saint John, New Brunswick, Canada
- Died: October 2, 2024 (aged 79) Saint John, New Brunswick, Canada
- Genres: Folk; rock
- Occupations: Musician; songwriter; producer
- Instruments: Vocals; guitar
- Years active: 1961–2024
- Labels: MGM; Attic

Kenneth Wayne Paul Tobias (July 25, 1945 – October 2, 2024) was a Canadian singer-songwriter. He is noted for penning the 1971 chart-topping hit for The Bells, "Stay Awhile", and for several top-selling recordings of his own.

== Early career ==
Born and raised in Saint John, New Brunswick, Tobias worked as a draftsman in the early 1960s while also appearing as a musician at local venues in Saint John. He joined a folk group named the Ramblers in 1961, playing guitar, and he later played drums in a rock band called the Badd Cedes. He moved to Halifax, Nova Scotia in 1965 and became a cast member for a local CBC Television show called Music Hop. He was a regular performer from 1966 to 1968 on the national variety program called Singalong Jubilee, which was also produced in Halifax. His duets with fellow cast-member and later recording star Anne Murray were well regarded. Also appearing on the show were such recognized performers as Gene MacLellan and John Allan Cameron. After three seasons in Halifax and Montreal, in 1968, Tobias met Bill Medley of the Righteous Brothers who invited him to Los Angeles to record and write as a salaried songwriter. Under the management of Medley's company, Tobias recorded his first single "You’re Not Even Going to the Fair" on Bell Records; like many of his early releases it was credited just to "Tobias". The song won him his first Canadian BMI award for airplay. This was the first of many BMI, Procan and SOCAN awards.

In 1970, he penned "Stay Awhile". Though originally conceived as a country-tinged solo piece, the song would emerge as a sensual duet by The Bells and became a soft rock classic of the early 1970s, peaking in 1971 at No. 1 in Canada and No. 7 on the US Billboard charts. "Stay Awhile" sold more than two million copies worldwide.

== Solo artist ==
After travelling back and forth between Los Angeles and Montreal, in 1972, Tobias settled in Toronto where he played as a backing musician with various bands. With his brother Tony Tobias, he established Glooscap Music and released several solo recordings that enjoyed extensive airplay in Canada, including "Fly Me High", and "Lady Luck". Ken Tobias is one of the few Canadians to receive the Socan Classics Award for 100,000 airplays of a given song, of which he had five awards, for "Stay Awhile", "I Just Want to Make Music", "Every Bit of Love", "Give a Little Love" and "Dream #2". Ken Tobias released eight albums and one radio sampler on various record labels. He also released about twenty singles.

In 1978, he toured Europe, and while there he collaborated on the soundtrack of the Italian Spaghetti Western Sella d'Argento (Silver Saddle/They Died with Their Boots On), directed by Lucio Fulci.

== Later life and death ==
Tobias lived in Toronto through the 1990s before returning to his native Saint John, where he remained, painting and continuing to write and perform music, and encouraging younger talents through the Songwriters Association of Canada. In 2002, he produced the debut album for Canadian artist Kim Jarrett. He also collaborated with local Saint John artist Jessica Rhaye.

In 2008, Tobias released From a Distance, his first new album in 24 years.

Tobias died from brain cancer in Saint John, on October 2, 2024, at the age of 79.

== Discography ==
Year	Title	Label	Chart RPM
1972	Dream No.2	MGM / Verve	68
1973	The Magic's in the Music	MGM	74
1975	Every Bit of Love	Attic	80
1976	Siren Spell	Attic	
1977	Street Ballet	Attic	89
1978	The Ken Tobias Collection – So Far... So Good	Attic	
1984	Gallery	CBC Enterprises	
1984	Friends: A Kid's Album of Pop Songs	Kiddin' Round Records / CBS Records	
1993	Pangaea (Radio Sampler)	Pangaea Records	
2008	From a Distance	The Pangaea Music House	
2011	Secrets (EP)	Self-Published	

== Singles ==
- "You're Not Even Going to the Fair" (Bell, 1969) (#78 CAN)
- "Now I'm in Love" (1971) (#70 CAN)
- "I'd Like to Know" (1971)
- "Dream #2" (MGM/Verve 1972) (#23 CAN)
- "I Just Want to Make Music" (1973) (#9 CAN)
- "Fly Me High" (1973) (#24 CAN)
- "On the Other Side" (1974)
- "Lover Come Quickly" (1974)
- "Lady Luck" (1975) (#31 CAN)
- "Run Away with Me" (1975) (#52 CAN)
- "Every Bit of Love" (1975) (#17 CAN)
- "Give a Little Love" (1976) (#21 CAN)
- "Oh Lynda" (1976)
- "Lovin' Fever" (1976)
- "Dancer" (1977) (#53 CAN)
- "Lovelight" (1977) (#54 CAN)
- "I Don't Want to Be Alone" (1978) (#80 CAN)
- "New York City" (1978) (#88 CAN)
- "Here You Are Today" (1983)
