= The Bells (band) =

Canadian soft rock band

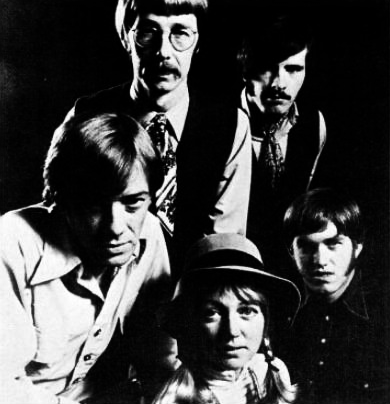
- The Bells in 1970

Background information
- Also known as: The Five Bells
- Origin: Montreal, Quebec, Canada
- Genres: Rock, soft rock
- Years active: 1964–1974
- Label: Polydor Records
- Members: Anne Ralph; Jackie Ralph; Cliff Edwards; Doug Gravelle; Gordon McLeod; Frank Mills; Dennis Will; Charlie Clark; John "Mike" Waye; Skip Layton; Will (Wayne) Cardinal

The Bells, or The Five Bells, were a Canadian soft rock band from Montreal, active from 1964 to 1974. They released five albums and several singles, two of which were major hits in the early 1970s, "Fly Little White Dove Fly" and "Stay Awhile".

== History ==
The band formed in 1964 in Montreal as the Five Bells. Members were South African-born sisters Anne and Jackie Ralph, Cliff Edwards, Doug Gravelle, and Gordon McLeod. Cliff Edwards and Anne Ralph married in 1967. The Five Bells' first big song was "Moody Manitoba Morning" (written by Rick Neufeld), which peaked on the RPM 100 chart at number 78 in the spring of 1969.

In 1970, after their first child was born, Anne retired and the family settled on a hobby farm in Warkworth, Ontario. The band shortened their name to the Bells, and recorded a hit single "Fly Little White Dove Fly", which made top 10 in Canada. Piano player Frank Mills joined the Bells for a short period, from 1970 to 1971, after which he left to pursue a solo career, the highlight of which was the number-three 1979 U.S. hit single "Music Box Dancer". Mills was replaced by piano player Dennis Will. Charlie Clark and Mike Waye also joined the band in 1970 as guitarist and bassist, respectively, and vocalists.

"White Dove" was followed up in 1971 by "Stay Awhile", a duet featuring Jackie Ralph and Cliff Edwards. Written by Saint John native Ken Tobias, the song became a major hit worldwide, selling four million copies and going to number one in Canada on the RPM 100 national Top Singles chart on April 10, 1971, and remaining there for two weeks. It also became their only top-40 hit in the United States, reaching number seven on the Billboard Hot 100. This single sold over one million copies before the major U.S. radio stations played it, and received a gold disc awarded by the R.I.A.A. on May 27, 1971. The success led to invitations to perform on The Tonight Show in June 1971 and The Merv Griffin Show. They also played a New Year's Eve show from the Waldorf Astoria Hotel with Guy Lombardo. In Australia, "Stay Awhile" reached number 9. Also that year, the single "Lady Dawn" appeared on the charts, peaking at number 11 on the Canadian charts in July.

During late 1972, the band had another hit in their native Canada, a cover of the Beatles' "Maxwell's Silver Hammer". It reached number 83 on the RPM 100 and number two on the Adult Contemporary chart.

The band broke up when Cliff Edwards departed for a solo career in 1973. The Bells had three Canadian top-10 singles from their final album, Pisces Rising (Polydor, 1973): "The Singer", "Hey My Love", and "He Was Me, He Was You". Jackie Ralph recruited new members, featuring a new rhythm section with Skip Layton on drums and Will (Wayne) Cardinal on bass; the band took on an edgier, country rock style. Layton and Cardinal were also members of the bands Faro and Ocean in 1976; Layton went on to become the drummer of Ambush.

In 2007, Guy Maddin used the Bells' song "Moody Manitoba Morning" in his film My Winnipeg. In 2014, Cliff Edwards and Anne Ralph's daughter, Jessica Edwards, released a documentary film about the Bells' career and the personal relationships of the group members. Titled Stay Awhile, it premiered at the Whistler Film Festival on December 6, 2014.

== Discography ==
Albums

- Dimensions (1969), Polydor, as the Five Bells
- Love, Luck 'n' Lollipops (1971), Polydor
- Fly, Little White Dove, Fly (1971), Polydor (No. 90 US)
- Stay Awhile (1971, EP), Polydor
- Studio "A" (1972), Polydor
- Pisces Rising (1973), Polydor
- The Best of the Bells (1974, compilation), Polydor
- Best of the Bells (1989, compilation), Polydor
- The Best of the Bells (2004, compilation), Universal Music Canada

Singles

- "V'la Le Bon Vent" / "Amen" (1966), as The Five Bells
- "Big City" / "Moody Manitoba Morning" (1969), as The Five Bells
- "Fly Little White Dove, Fly" / "Follow The Sun" (1970) (No. 9 CAN)
- "Je Vais Rester / "Blanc Petit Oiseau Blanc" (1970)
- "Sweet Sounds of Music" (1971)
- "Homeward Bound" / "For Better for Worse" (1971)
- "For Better For Worse" / "To Know You Is to Love You" (1971)
- "Stay Awhile" / "Sing A Song of Freedom" (1971) (No. 1 CAN)
- "I Love You Lady Dawn" / "Rain" (1971)
- "Lady Dawn" (1971)
- "Maxwell's Silver Hammer" / "Moody Manitoba Morning" (1972)
- "Oh My Love" / "You You You" (1972)
- "The Singer" / "Love Once Removed" (1973)
- "He Was Me, He Was You" / "Child of Mine" (1973)
- "Hey My Love" (1973)
