= The Discoverie of Witchcraft =

1584 book by Reginald Scot

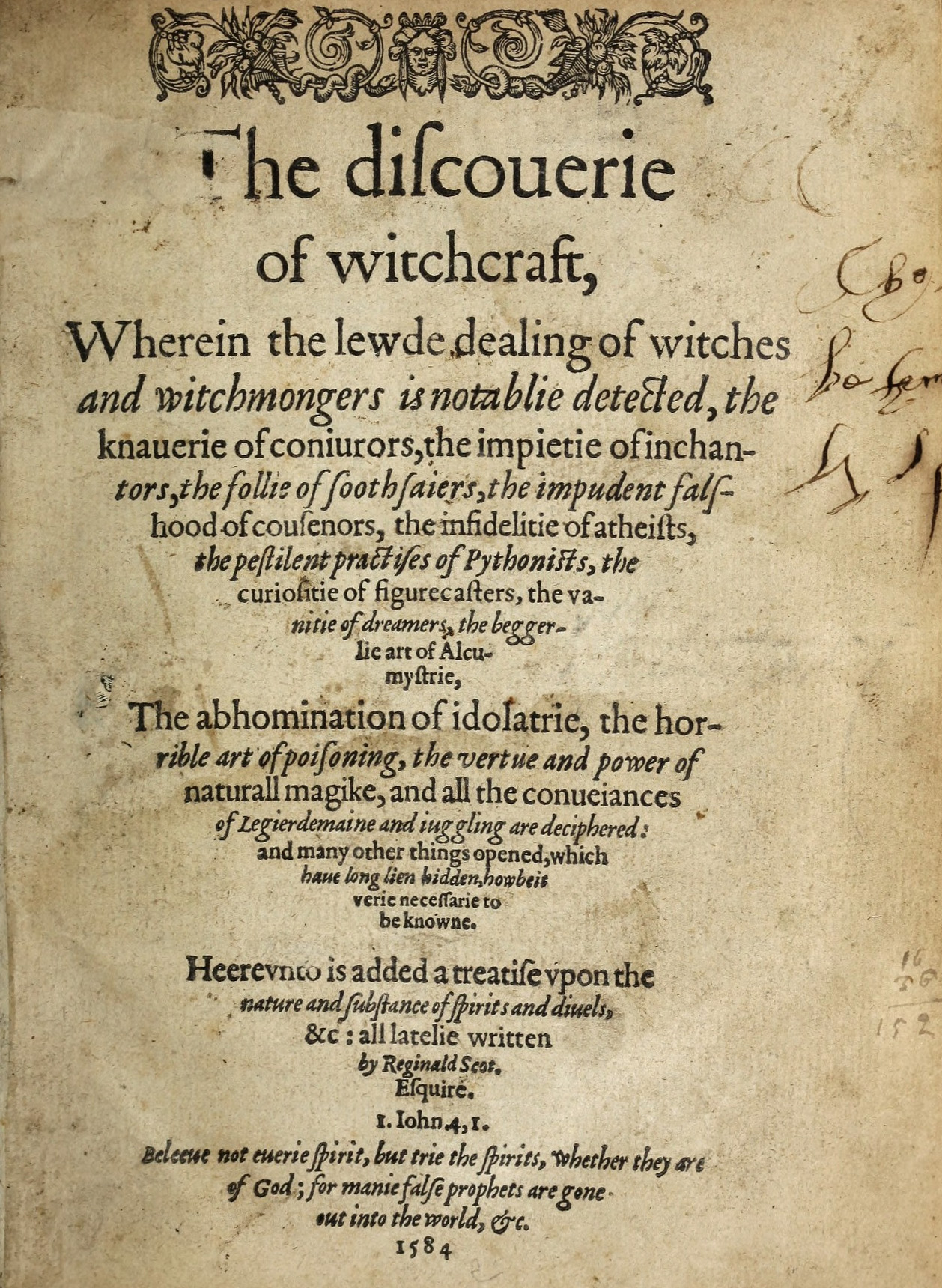
- Title page of the first edition (1584)
- Author: Reginald Scot
- Language: English
- Published: 1584
- Publication place: England

The Discoverie of Witchcraft is a book published by the English gentleman Reginald Scot in 1584, intended as an exposé of early modern witchcraft. It contains a small section intended to show how the public was fooled by charlatans, which is considered the first published material on illusionary or stage magic.

Scot believed that the prosecution of those accused of witchcraft was irrational and not Christian, and he held the Roman Church responsible. Popular belief held that all obtainable copies were burned on the accession of James I in 1603.

== Publication ==
Scot's book appeared entitled "The Discoverie of Witchcraft, wherein the Lewde dealing of Witches and Witchmongers is notablie detected, in sixteen books ... whereunto is added a Treatise upon the Nature and Substance of Spirits and Devils", 1584. At the end of the volume the printer gives his name as William Brome.

There are four dedications: to Sir Roger Manwood, chief baron of the exchequer; another to Scot's cousin, Sir Thomas Scot; a third jointly to John Coldwell, then dean of Rochester, and to William Redman, then Archdeacon of Canterbury; and a fourth "to the readers". Scott enumerates 212 authors whose works in Latin he had consulted, and twenty-three authors who wrote in English. The names in the first list include many Greek and Arabic writers; among those in the second are John Bale, John Foxe, Sir Thomas More, John Record, Barnabe Googe, Abraham Fleming, and William Lambarde. But Scot's information was not only from books. He had studied superstitions respecting witchcraft in courts of law in country districts, where the prosecution of witches was unceasing, and in village life, where the belief in witchcraft flourished in many forms.

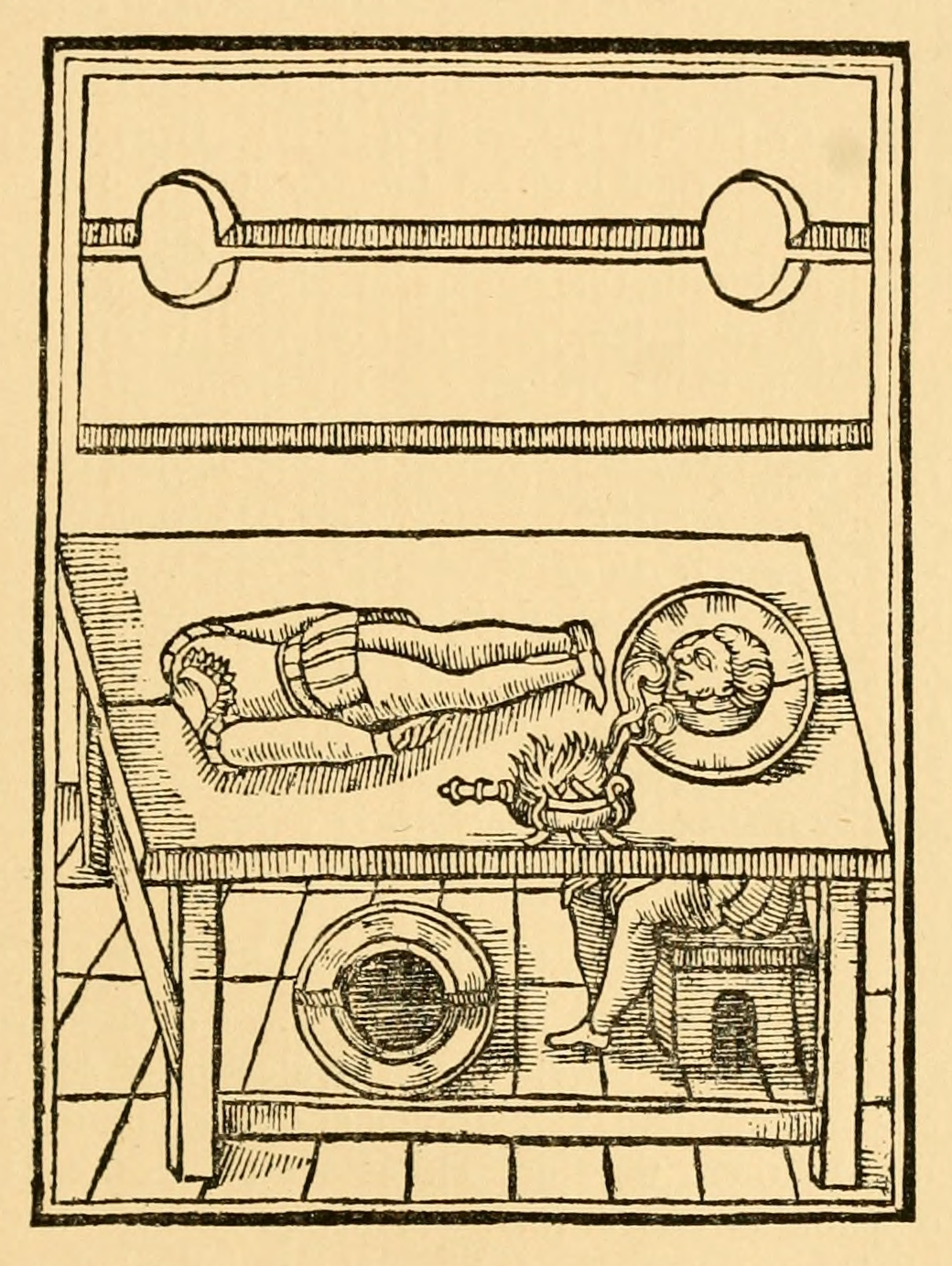
Scot's diagram explaining the "Decollation of John Baptist" illusion, in which the performer appears "to cut off ones head, and to laie it in a platter": the table has two holes, and one person raises their head through the rightmost while a second person lies on the table with their head in the leftmost hole. The second person's neck is dressed with "a little dough kneded with bul/locks bloud".

He set himself to prove that the belief in witchcraft and magic was rejected by reason and by religion and that spiritualistic manifestations were wilful impostures or illusions due to mental disturbance in the observers. His aim was to prevent the persecution of poor, aged, and simple persons, who were popularly credited with being witches. The maintenance of the superstition he blamed largely on the Roman Catholic Church, and he attacked writers including Jean Bodin (1530–1596), author of Démonomanie des Sorciers (Paris, 1580), and Jacobus Sprenger, supposed joint author of Malleus Maleficarum (Nuremberg, 1494).

Of Cornelius Agrippa and Johann Weyer, author of De Præstigiis Demonum (Basle, 1566), whose views he adopted, he spoke with respect. Scot did adopt contemporary superstition in his references to medicine and astrology. He believed in the medicinal value of the unicorn's horn, and thought that precious stones owed their origin to the influence of the heavenly bodies. The book also narrates stories of strange phenomena in the context of religious convictions. The devil is related with such stories and his ability to absorb people's souls. The book also gives stories of magicians with supernatural powers performing in front of courts of kings.

== Influence ==
The Discoverie of Witchcraft and The First Part of Clever and Pleasant Inventions by Jean Prevost, both published in 1584, are considered the seminal works of magic. Scot's volume became an exhaustive encyclopædia of contemporary beliefs about witchcraft, spirits, alchemy, magic, and legerdemain, as well as attracting widespread attention to his scepticism on witchcraft. William Shakespeare drew from his study of Scot's book hints for his picture of the witches in Macbeth, and Thomas Middleton in his play of The Witch likewise was indebted to this source. Through bibliographies, one may trace modern grimoires to this work. The chapter on magic tricks in Scot's Discoverie was later plagiarised heavily; it was the basis of The Art of Juggling (1612) by S. R., and Hocus Pocus Junior (1634). Scot's early writings constituted a substantial portion (in some cases, nearly all) of the text in English-language stage magic books of the 17th and 18th centuries. Some of the principles of conjuring and sleight of hand outlined by Scot are still used by modern magicians. These include sleight of hand tricks involving balls, coins, and playing cards, and the use of confederates. The book is still highly sought after by collectors and historians of magic.

== Controversy ==
The debate over the contested Christian doctrine continued for the following decades. Gabriel Harvey, in his Pierce's Supererogation (1593), wrote:

Scotte's discoovery of Witchcraft dismasketh sundry egregious impostures, and in certaine principall chapters, and speciall passages, hitteth the nayle on the head with a witnesse; howsoever I could have wished he had either dealt somewhat more curteously with Monsieur Bondine [i.e. Bodin], or confuted him somewhat more effectually.

William Perkins sought to refute Scot, and was joined by the powerful James VI of Scotland in his Daemonologie (1597), referring to the opinions of Scot as "damnable". John Rainolds in Censura Librorum Apocryphorum (1611), Richard Bernard in Guide to Grand Jurymen (1627), Joseph Glanvill in Philosophical Considerations touching Witches and Witchcraft (1666), and Meric Casaubon in Credulity and Uncredulity (1668) continued the attack on Scot's position.

Scot found contemporary support in the influential Samuel Harsnet, and his views continued to be defended later by Thomas Ady Candle in the Dark: Or, A Treatise concerning the Nature of Witches and Witchcraft (1656), and by John Webster in The Displaying of Supposed Witchcraft (1677) and was known to typical lay sceptics such as Henry Oxinden.

== Later editions ==
The book was well-received abroad. A translation into Dutch, edited by Thomas Basson, an English stationer living at Leiden, appeared there in 1609. It was undertaken on the recommendation of the professors, and was dedicated to the university curators and the burgomaster of Leiden. A second edition, published by G. Basson, the first editor's son, was printed at Leiden in 1637.

In 1651 the book was twice reissued in London in quarto by Richard Cotes; the two issues differ slightly in the imprint on the title page. Another reissue was dated 1654. A third edition in folio, dated 1665, included nine new chapters, and added a second book to "The Discourse on Devils and Spirits". The third edition was published with two imprints in 1665, one being the Turk Head edition; the scarcer variant was at the Golden-Ball. In 1886 Brinsley Nicholson edited a reprint of the first edition of 1584, with the additions of that of 1665. This edition was limited to 250 copies of which the first 50 were numbered restricted editions with a slip of paper inserted by Elliot Stock at the beginning. The binding was also different.
