= Five Childhood Lyrics =

Choral composition by John Rutter

- Choral music by John Rutter
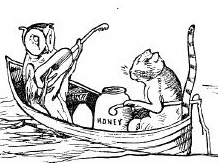
- "The Owl and the Pussycat", 1888 illustration by Edward Lear, whose text is set in the second song
- Text: Nursery rhymes
- Performed: 1973: London
- Published: 1974: Oxford OUP
- Movements: five
- Scoring: SATB choir

Five Childhood Lyrics is a choral composition by John Rutter, who set five texts, poems and nursery rhymes, for mixed voices (SATB with some divisi) a cappella. Rutter composed the work for the London Concord Singers who first performed them in 1973.

The five movements are:

1. Monday's Child
2. The Owl and the Pussycat
3. Windy Nights
4. Matthew, Mark, Luke and John
5. Sing a Song of Sixpence

The first song is based on "Monday's Child", a fortune-telling song and nursery rhyme. The text of the second song is "The Owl and the Pussycat", a nonsense-poem by Edward Lear published in 1871. The third song is based on a poem, "Windy Nights", by Robert Louis Stevenson. The text for the fourth song is "Matthew, Mark, Luke and John", a nursery rhyme and evening prayer. The fifth song uses the nursery rhyme "Sing a Song of Sixpence". The composer noted: "The Five Childhood lyrics are a kind of 'homage' to the world of children. I chose for my texts some of the rhymes and verses remembered from my earliest years, and set them to music as simply as I could—though the last of the five, which uses a familiar nursery tune, contains a certain amount of tongue-in-cheek elaboration." The pieces were described by a reviewer for Gramophone as "delightful compositions", while another reviewer noted "the energy and sharp-witted invention that characterize these youthful pieces". The work was first published in 1974 by Oxford University Press.

The songs were recorded in a collection of Rutter's secular works titled Fancies, performed under his direction by the Cambridge Singers, together with the summer songs of the same name, the winter songs When Icicles Hang, and the instrumental Suite Antique. They were recorded in 2002 on an album of secular music by Rutter, with Nicol Matt conducting the Nordic Chamber Choir.
