= Thomas Ady =

English writer (fl. 17th century)

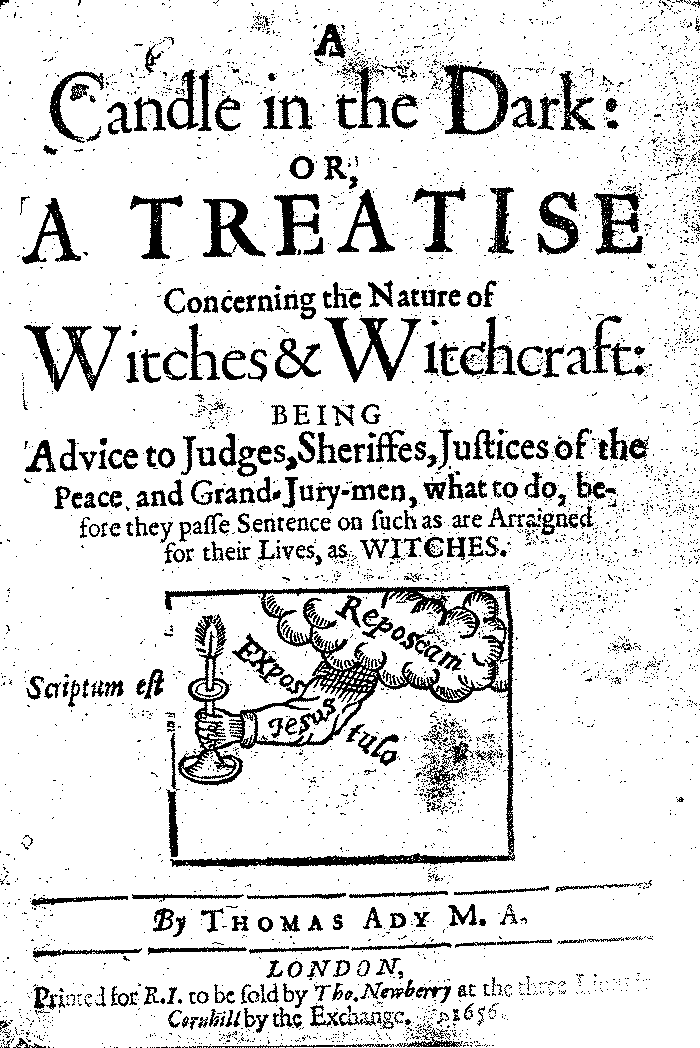
Thomas Ady's A Candle in the Dark frontispiece

Thomas Ady (fl. 17th century) was an English physician and humanist who was the author of two sceptical books on witchcraft and witch-hunting.

His first and best known work, A Candle in the Dark: Or, A Treatise Concerning the Nature of Witches & Witchcraft, was used unsuccessfully by George Burroughs, formerly the Puritan minister of the parish, in his defense during the Salem witch trials. Ady's second publication, published in 1661, was a reprint of his first, with a new title, A Perfect Discovery of Witches. The work could have been re-named in honour of Reginald Scot's Discoverie of Witchcraft, the first book of its kind in the English language. But pamphlets about cases of witchcraft tended to use 'Discovery' in their titles (The most strange and admirable discouerie of the three witches of Warboys, The vvonderfull discouerie of witches in the countie of Lancaster, etc.). Ady's point is that he discovers what 'witches' really are, despite all the accusations: innocent. His third publication was The Doctrine of Devils proved to be the grand apostacy of these later times. An essay tending to rectifie those undue notions and apprehensions men have about daemons and evil spirits (1676).

== A Candle in the Dark ==
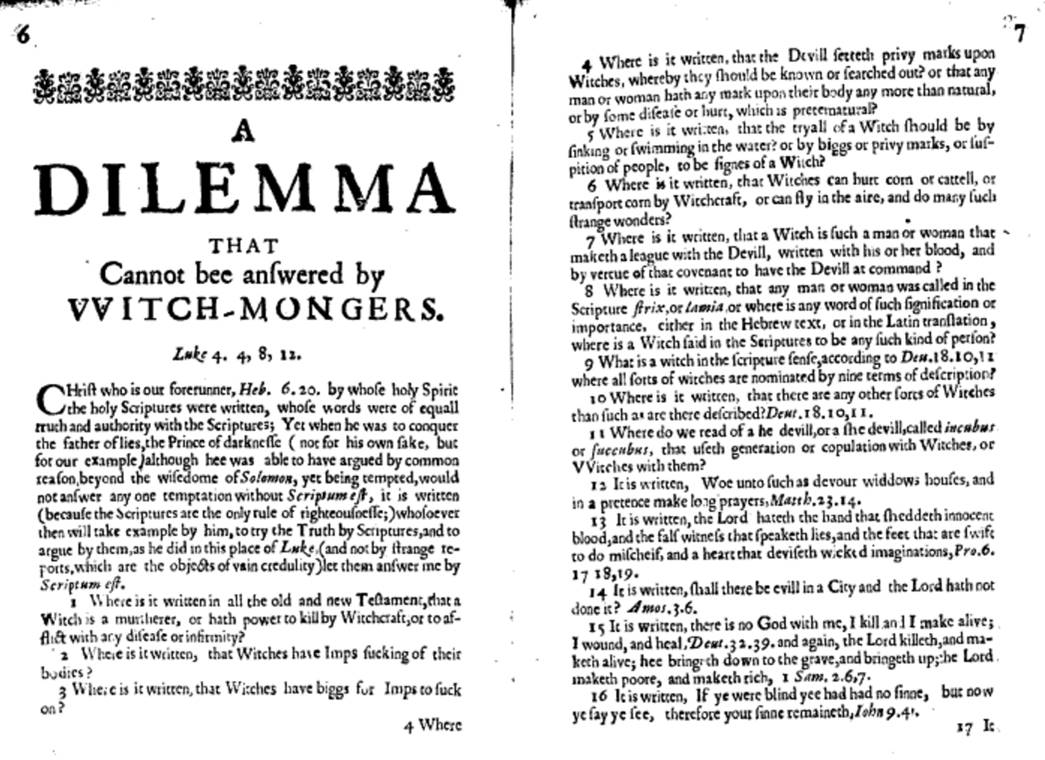
Ady's direct challenge to the clergy: Where in the Bible?

In A Candle in the Dark, Ady attacked current ideas of witchcraft by arguing directly about what the Bible actually says. Ady has the intellectual firepower to dispute the significance of words translated simply as 'witch' in the King James Bible, deploring the competence of the translators. Exodus 22:18 he explains as meaning that a 'juggler', a fraud who deploys "false Miracles, to delude and seduce the people to Idolatry" should not be suffered to live (not 'witch' or 'sorceress'). In the first of the book's three parts, Ady argues that the well-known prohibition against witches in Deuteronomy 18:10-11

There shall not be found among you any one that maketh his son or his daughter to pass through the fire, or that useth divination, or an observer of times, or an enchanter, or a witch. Or a charmer, or a consulter with familiar spirits, or a wizard, or a necromancer. ([Authorized King James Version])

should be read to define witches as "the popish (Catholic) rout, the contrivers of charms to delude the people. (emphasis in original).

He questions why contemporary proofs of witchcraft do not have biblical support (see page image).

Where is it written in all the Old and New Testaments that a witch is a murderer, or hath power to kill by witchcraft, or to afflict with any disease or infirmity? Where is it written that witches have biggs (nipples) for imps to suck on ... that the devil setteth privy marks upon witches ... that witches can hurt corn or cattle ... or can fly in the air .... Where do we read of a he-devil or she-devil, called incubus or succubus, that useth generation or copulation?

Ady's anti-Catholicism is ferocious. If he earnestly wants to end one persecution, he is willing to start another:

He that will be zealous for God, in obeying the command given in Exod. 22.18. Suffer not a Witch to live, must leave his fond ignorant course of teaching people to hang up poor, and widows, and aged, and lame helpless people, and must bend his devotion against that Whore of Rome (as all the world ought to do) as also against the Mahometan Witches among the Turks. Therefore it were a good Law in England, if duly kept, That no Jesuite, or Popish Priest should be suffered to live, in any part of these Dominions, because these Witches are they that bewitch the people (where they be tollerated) by their several deluding impostures, leading the people to Idolatry, and also to the undermining of Governments.

Ady's view is that the Civil War was God punishing the English for shedding innocent blood in witchcraft persecutions. He expresses particular disgust for the techniques of sleep-deprivation by which Matthew Hopkins coerced confessions, and is indignant about the execution in 1645 of an octogenarian minister, Master Lewis, on the basis of wild stories and purported teats on the old man's body (haemorrhoids, says Ady).

Ady points to both Scotland and Germany as places where the misguided attempt to deflect God's wrath by action against 'witches' has in practice drawn down that very wrath on each nation.

In dealing with apparently voluntary confessions, Ady takes an enlightened view that those who confess are just melancholics (mentally disturbed) who have been given by demonology a template to which they conform themselves in their delusions:

Truly if such Doctrins had not been taught to such people formerly, their melancholly distempers had not had any such objects to work upon, but who shall at last answer for their confession, but they that have infected the mindes of common people with such devillish doctrins?

This insight anticipates psychological study of those who are 'acting under a description' (in the analysis offered by Ian Hacking).

Ady writes like a typical 17th century intellectual: a contemporary reader can feel intellectually bludgeoned as his arguments mount up (he really does reach as far as a "sixteenthly").

The third part attacks contemporary writers on witchcraft and demonology. Ady suggests the book Daemonologie attributed to King James was ghostwritten by the Bishop of Winchester. He also disagrees strongly with Thomas Cooper ("a bloody persecutor of the poor"), author of the book The Mystery of Witchcraft (1617) and with William Perkins's Discourse of the Damned Art of Witchcraft (1608), calling it "a collection of mingled notions" from Jean Bodin, Bartolommeo Spina, and "other popish blood suckers" who wrote "great volumes of horrible lies and impossibilities." Perkins was a very distinguished puritan divine: Ady ingeniously suggests that this posthumously published work by the great man was erroneously put into print, and was actually Perkins' notes for a refutation of witchcraft belief. Ady also corrects John Gaule (author of Select Cases of Conscience touching Witches and Witchcrafts (1646), making a personal exhortation to the cleric to renounce his errors, and Mysmatia, the Mag-astromancer (1652)). George Gifford (author of A Discourse of the Subtle Practices of Devils by Witches and Sorcerers (1587) and A Dialogue Concerning Witches and Witchcrafts (1593) is more gently treated, as having more "spirit of truth" in him than many of his (clerical) profession).

The scholar George Lincoln Burr called A Candle in the Dark "one of the bravest and most rational of the early protests".

== Quotes ==
I will speak of one man ... that went about in King James his time ... who called himself, the Kings Majesties most excellent Hocus Pocus, and so was called, because that at the playing of every Trick, he used to say, Hocus pocus, tontus tabantus, vade celeriter jubeo, a dark composure of words, to blinde the eyes of the beholders, to make his Trick pass the more currently without discovery (Thomas Ady, "A Candle in the Dark", 1655).

This quote from "A Candle in the Dark" was used an epigraph to Dan Chapman's 2014 novel, "Closed Circuit".

== The Doctrine of Devils ==
Ady's third publication on witchcraft was published anonymously in 1676. It is a powerful rhetorical performance. To express his scorn for demonology, Ady deploys an informal style, developed from Scot's use of ridicule. Ady writes in a confrontational way:

This doctrine of the unlimited power of Devils in naturals, thus by Christians entertained, is the highest and most abominable Apostacy, that ever was or can be in respect of Christ. (Chapter V)

I Will not absolutely, positively, and definitively say it of Demonologers, That they worship the Devil directly ... Let Demonologers look out, abroad, round; but let them look home inward, and to themselves too: I fear they may find those abominable Idolators nearer home, than where they look for them. They are not simple or gross Idolators, such as worship wood and stone ... a finer, purer, neater, sprucer sort of Christians, Protestants or Papists (Angelicks as they would be thought) may take themselves by the Nose, and say, we are the Men. Is there any reason, ground, motive or hint, to fasten this to any but them? One Apostle saith, In the latter times, some will obstinately worship Devils, That will be the great villany in the latter age; The other saith, They will give heed to the doctrine of Devils: Put both together and this is the result, They that give heed to the doctrine of Devils, are the great Apostates, and obstinate worshippers of the Devil, which is the worst and most abominable Idolatry of the latter times, or ever was in any time. (Chapter XIX)

Ady is indignant that demonology makes Satan a 'greater Miracler' (in 'To the Reader') than Christ. He argues flatly against demonic possession: passages in the New Testament where Christ drives out devils from possessed people are represented by Ady as the way the gospel writers described Christ healing the mad. Nor will he have the 'hypostatical union' of godhead and human nature easily reproduced by devils combining their nature with that of a human being.

For Ady, the witch hunt is:

Bloody, Barbarous, Cruel and Murtherous Opinion, an Opinion that Butchers up Men and Women without Fear or Wit, Sense or Reason, Care or Conscience, by droves; So many in Somerset, so many in Lancashire---so many in another County, Ten, Twenty, Thirty at a clap (Chapter XXIV)

Ady insists on the fictiveness of demonology: 'this Babel of Confusion, is built merely upon the Sandy Foundation of Tales and Fables' (Chapter XXVIII). It is a product of 'Demonologistical Winter-Tales, and Witchcraftical Legendaries' (Chapter XXX), a demonologist 'would needs prove by Tale upon Tale' (XXXI).

Impatient, scornful, accusatory by turns, Ady's last book shows no diminishing of his anger.

== Influences ==
Thomas Ady's works are directly influenced by Reginald Scot and his Discoverie of Witchcraft. He called Scot 'the Chief and First Anti-demonologist, of this Nation at least' (in his The Doctrine of Devils). They are also influenced by works such as Hocus Pocus Junior on juggling and stage magic. Works of the period sometimes used specific examples of illusionist tricks to reveal superstition.

Ady's works resemble other works on freedom of conscience written at that time, particularly Roger Williams's well-known The Bloudy Tenant of Persecution for the Cause of Conscience, written in 1644. Like Ady, Williams makes extensive use of scripture to show why religious persecution is wrong.

== Influenced ==
Ady's Candle in the Dark contains the first record of the nursery rhyme Mathew, Mark, Luke, and John.

His book also is one of the earliest references to the origin of the word hocus pocus as a Latin-like phrase used by a conjurer to distract his audience from his sleight of hand, which also relates to where the word hoax comes from. See the articles Hocus Pocus (magic) and hoax on Wikipedia for more information, as well as the etymologies for hoax and hocus pocus.

An extract from his book, A Candle in the Dark: Or, A Treatise Concerning the Nature of Witches & Witchcraft, was used by George Burroughs, formerly the minister in the parish, in his own defense during the Salem witch trials. Cotton Mather comments in hostile fashion in his Wonders of the Invisible World: 'he gave in a paper, to the Jury; wherein, altho' he had many times before, granted, not only that there are Witches, but also that the present sufferings of the Countrey are the Effect of horrible Witchcrafts, yet he now goes to, evince it, That there neither are, nor ever were, Witches that having made a compact with the Divel, Can send a Divel to Torment other people at a distance. This paper was transcribed out of Ady; which the Court presently knew, as soon as they heard it. But he said, he had taken none of it out of any Book; for which his evasion afterwards was, that a Gentleman gave him the discourse, in a manuscript, from whence he Transcribed it. The Jury brought him in guilty; But when he came to die, he utterly deny'd the Fact, whereof he had been thus convicted.' It is remarkable (if it is true) that the Court in Salem were so quick to identify an extract from such a witchcraft-sceptical text.

Ady's books here, or Reginald Scot's and Roger Williams' works cited earlier, resemble books on conscience that came later that also use the Bible, notably those of the Christian Abolitionist Movement. For instance, A Condensed Anti-Slavery Bible Argument (1845) by George Bourne, and God Against Slavery (1857) by George B. Cheever.

The subtitle of astronomer Carl Sagan's 1995 book The Demon-Haunted World - "Science as a Candle in the Dark" - was clearly inspired by Ady's 1656 book of the same name; Ady is quoted multiple times throughout Sagan's book.

== Life ==
There is no Oxford Dictionary of National Biography life of Ady, and this is a surprising omission. Some biographical information about Ady is independent of his writings. On 10 June 1634 Thomas Ady or Adye of Weathersfield, "A famous Dr of Physick", married Barbara the daughter of William Sparrow of Sible Hedingham. Of Ady's father-in-law, it is said in the history of Essex (1831) that "William Sparrow, of Sible Hedingham, the eldest surviving son, succeeded his father, who died in 1589: he married Joan, daughter of John Finch, of Gestingthorp, by whom he had three sons, John, William, and Joseph, and two daughters, Jame and Barbara; the last of whom was married to Thomas Ady, M.D. of Wethersfield. William, the second son, was a clothier, father of William, attorney-at-law, of Sible Hedingham, and died in 1648.".

They lived in Wethersfield, and their son was educated at Felsted and Sidney Sussex College, Cambridge; and was admitted to Gray's Inn in 1667. Records show that Barbara was baptised on 9 September 1610, and Thomas left a PCC will [PROB 11/339] dated 15 October 1662 and proved 20 May 1672, in which he describes himself as "being a professed member of the true Christian Protestant Church of England desireing to live and dye in the true Christian faith". He named his wife Barbara, daughter Dorothy married to William Collard, son Thomas under 21 years, and daughters Joana and Barbara in his will. His daughter Barbara married Mark Mott, who died and was buried in Wethersfield 22 May 1694.

== See also ==
- Discoverie of Witchcraft
- Matthew, Mark, Luke and John
- Hocus Pocus (magic)
