= Maxwell's Silver Hammer =

1969 song by the Beatles

- Northern Songs sheet music cover

Song by the Beatles

from the album Abbey Road
- Released: 26 September 1969
- Recorded: 9–11 July; 6, 25 August 1969
- Studio: EMI, London
- Genre: Pop; pop rock; music hall
- Length: 3:27
- Label: Apple
- Songwriters: Paul McCartney, credited to Lennon–McCartney
- Producer: George Martin

Licensed audio
- "Maxwell's Silver Hammer (Remastered 2009)" on YouTube

"Maxwell's Silver Hammer" is a song by the English rock band the Beatles from their 1969 album Abbey Road. Written and sung by Paul McCartney, it tells the story of Maxwell Edison, a medicine student who murders people with a hammer; it has been described as a pop, pop rock, and music hall song.

McCartney wrote the song in October 1968 during the recording sessions for the Beatles' 1968 White Album. He described it as a symbolism for the downfalls of life, his "analogy for when something goes wrong out of the blue, as it so often does". The Beatles rehearsed "Maxwell's Silver Hammer" multiple times in January 1969 during sessions for Get Back, before they recorded it for Abbey Road on 9, 10, and 11 July. McCartney led the group through painstaking effort and great lengths of time to develop the song, and as a result, his bandmates remembered its recording sessions coldly; John Lennon recalled that McCartney "made us do it a hundred million times", and Ringo Starr declared it "the worst track we ever had to record". The song makes use of the anvil and Moog synthesizer – the first Beatles song to use the latter.

Apple Records released "Maxwell's Silver Hammer" on 26 September 1969, as part of Abbey Road. Lennon said that McCartney considered releasing the song as a single, but these plans were not addressed. An alternate take of the track appears on the Beatles' 1996 compilation Anthology 3. Some critics have faulted its silliness and defective songwriting; it has placed in the middle half of rankings of the Beatles' discography. "Maxwell's Silver Hammer" has been covered by several artists, such as George Fenton, Steve Martin, Frankie Laine, and the Bells. McCartney's original handwritten lyrics for the song were auctioned in 2022 for the starting price of $425,000.

== Background and inspiration ==
Paul McCartney wrote "Maxwell's Silver Hammer" during the recording sessions for the Beatles' White Album in October 1968. However, its first verse originated earlier in spring, while the Beatles were studying under Maharishi Mahesh Yogi in Rishikesh, India. It was McCartney's analogy for when something goes wrong. To portray this symbolically, he created a character named Maxwell armed with a silver hammer. He described the track as "the kind of song I like to write" and said it was "a silly story about all these people I'd never met". The band did not complete "Maxwell's Silver Hammer" in time to make the White Album, as most of its tracks had been recorded by October.

McCartney's wife Linda recalled that he had grown interested in avant-garde theatre and immersed himself in the works of the French symbolist writer Alfred Jarry. Jarry founded pataphysics, a "science of imaginary solutions" that holds every measly or ordinary event in the universe to be extraordinary and hence meaningful. In 1966, McCartney listened to Jarry's play Ubu Cocu on the radio and was intrigued. This influence manifests itself in the song's storyline and tone and also explains how McCartney came across the word pataphysical. The author Kenneth Womack knots Jarry's pataphysics and the band's notions of karma fostered under the Maharishi to explain Maxwell's senseless, murderous acts; he quotes John Lennon as saying: "[T]he idea behind the song was that the minute you do something that’s not right, Maxwell's silver hammer will come down on your head". McCartney made the hammer silver because, his words, "it just sounded better than 'Maxwell's Hammer'". While McCartney wrote the song, it is credited to the Lennon–McCartney partnership.

== Composition ==
=== Music ===
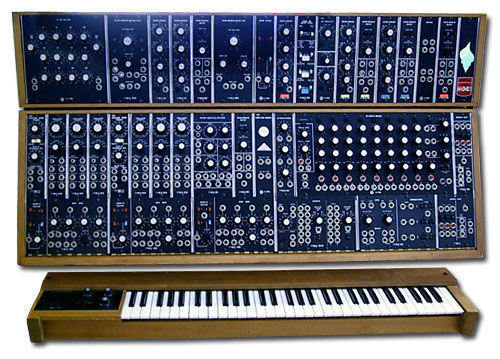
"Maxwell's Silver Hammer" features a Moog synthesizer played by McCartney.

"Maxwell's Silver Hammer" is a pop, pop rock, and music hall song with a length of three minutes and twenty-seven seconds. It is in the key of D major and follows common time. It comprises three verses, five refrains, three interludes, and an outro. Its arrangement comprises guitars, bass, drums, piano, Hammond organ, and a Moog synthesizer played by McCartney, the first time the latter featured on a Beatles track; an anvil part is also included. Discussing the Moog's use, George Martin thought that "Maxwell's Silver Hammer" had a somewhat "floaty, mystical" sound.

The verses span twenty bars, opening with a square sixteen-bar section that runs through a I–V/ii–ii–V–I–V chord progression twice; then follow four bars linking to the refrain (V/V–V). The harmony opens out from I to V. The refrain is made up of two variant phrases: the first features three times, alone in the first refrain and then tagged onto the second and third refrains as an instrumental, while the second appears at the beginning of the second and third refrains. The first phrase has a closed harmonic shape (starting and ending in I), and the second's is opened from I to V. The musicologist Alan W. Pollack thinks the interlude "works just as nicely as a soft-shoe dancing kind of break between the middle sections"; although "Maxwell's Silver Hammer" has no actual introduction, the interlude feels "intro-like". It is four bars long and has an open chord progression that "creates a momentary illusion of wide ranging movement". Here, the bassline switches from D to G before returning to D. The outro is a closing repeat of the interlude, and the beat of the anvil "helps seal the ending", as Pollack remarks. As for its role in Abbey Road, "Maxwell's Silver Hammer"'s home key of D major hearkens back to "Come Together" and foreshadows "I Want You (She's So Heavy)"; thus, he argues, the album's first side can be said to be in D.

The music itself is 'okay' as far as facile, singable pop song fodder go, but the attempt to cut the cutsey cloying cliché with straight-faced black comedy about a brutal serial killer would seem to fall flat. Could it ever have been in style or good taste?

— Alan W. Pollack in his Notes

The song's sections link together through markedly deliberate instrumentation or parts, like piano arpeggios into the third verse. The musicologist Tim Riley comments on the prominence of such stylistic garnishes and flourishes in "Maxwell's Silver Hammer": the change in pattern from one refrain to the next, the synthesizer countermelody, strikes of the anvil at a "bang, bang" lyric, and background vocals, for example. He feels that partly because of these, the track's light comedic nature "falls flat". "Such gimmickry is a sure sign of weak material: it doesn't generate its own setting, so one has to be designed to keep it propped up", he concludes. Likewise, in the music critic Ian MacDonald's view, "Maxwell's Silver Hammer" is "[c]ompulsively fertile in melody and fascinated by music's formal beauties", and this reflects "[McCartney's] worst lapse of taste under the auspices of The Beatles". He feels the song is devoid of expression and meaning. The music professor Dominic Pedler compared its stylistic structure to the Willie Nelson song "Crazy" (1954). In their book Playing the Great Beatles Basslines (2006), Tony Bacon and Gareth Morgan write that McCartney's bassline is "open and effective".

=== Lyrics ===
"Maxwell's Silver Hammer" follows Maxwell Edison, a medicine student who becomes a serial killer; the dark lyrics are hidden by an upbeat sound. He uses the "silver hammer" to kill his girlfriend and his lecturer. He goes to court for these killings, where Rose and Valerie, fans of Maxwell, push for him to be released. As the judge makes the verdict, Maxwell murders him. McCartney said the lyrics "epitomize the downfalls of life". The author Hunter Davies thinks they orbit around a metaphor, stating: "The narrative is fairly ghastly – about someone called Maxwell who goes around killing people – but it is all a metaphor, about how just when things seem to be going well in life, down on your head comes a hammer – metaphorically, of course."

"Maxwell's Silver Hammer"
A 15-second sample from the chorus of "Maxwell's Silver Hammer". The lyrics focus on Maxwell Edison, a medicine student who commits murders with a hammer. The song's upbeat sound masks the dark lyrics.

According to Riley, Maxwell may have come across as a "spoof anti-hero" like the Paperback Writer ("Paperback Writer") and Bungalow Bill ("The Continuing Story of Bungalow Bill"), but his "elaborate musical character makes him sound like a contrived Looney Tune" instead. Pollack notes that the "bang bang" sound is one of the very few instances of onomatopoeia in the band's catalogue. Richie Unterberger of AllMusic contrasts McCartney's vocals against Maxwell's grisly acts. He states that when the chorus begins, it sounds like Maxwell is "celebrating a birthday [rather] than like he's announcing the death of victims by cruel and unusual means".

== Twickenham rehearsals ==
"Maxwell's Silver Hammer" was one of the many new songs the Beatles rehearsed at Twickenham Film Studios in south-west London on 3 January 1969. The band was working on the album Get Back, which would later become Let It Be. With Get Back, the Beatles sought to return to their musical roots after venturing into complex, luxurious recordings. The project sparked part of the band's desire to return to live performance for the first time since their 1966 North American tour; according to the Beatles historian Chris Ingham, McCartney planned for the band "to learn some songs, record them without frills, play them at a concert and film the whole thing". Footage of the songs' rehearsals, directed by Michael Lindsay-Hogg, would be spun into a documentary aired just before a new televised Beatles concert. However, McCartney's plans were abandoned, and the band instead ended up giving a performance on the rooftop of Apple Studios.

McCartney presented "Maxwell's Silver Hammer" – "the corny one", as he described it – to the band on 3 January. They only performed it twice on the first day. According to the biographers Doug Sulpy and Ray Schweighardt, these performances were "very loose"; the author Barry Miles also deems the song's rehearsals "poor". The line-up was McCartney on lead vocals and bass guitar, Lennon and George Harrison on guitar, and Ringo Starr on drums, although Harrison soon decided to switch over to bass and McCartney moved to the piano. Returning to "Maxwell's Silver Hammer" on 7 January, the Beatles devoted plenty of time to rehearsing it. McCartney had recommended adding an anvil part on the recording; once they procured one, he instructed the band's road manager Mal Evans to bang it with a hammer during the chorus and conclusion. At this stage, the song had a whistling chorus and breaks that were later shed off. Sulpy and Schweighardt state that Harrison suggested having "a lot of people" sing in the chorus, but McCartney was "too busy singing to respond", and when he put forth his suggestion again, they gave him no reply. The Beatles continued working on the song until ceasing altogether on 9 January, the day before Harrison left the sessions out of bitterness at – what he saw as – McCartney's overbearing treatment of him, Ono's persistent presence in the studio, and Lennon's passing engagement with Get Back.

== Recording ==
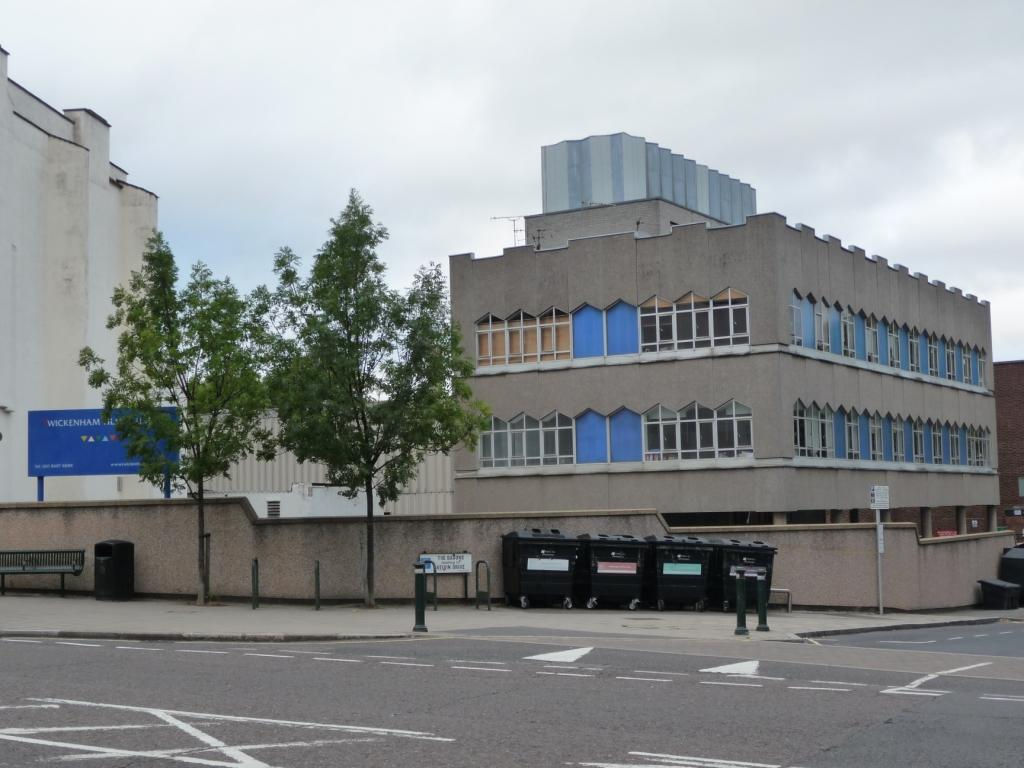
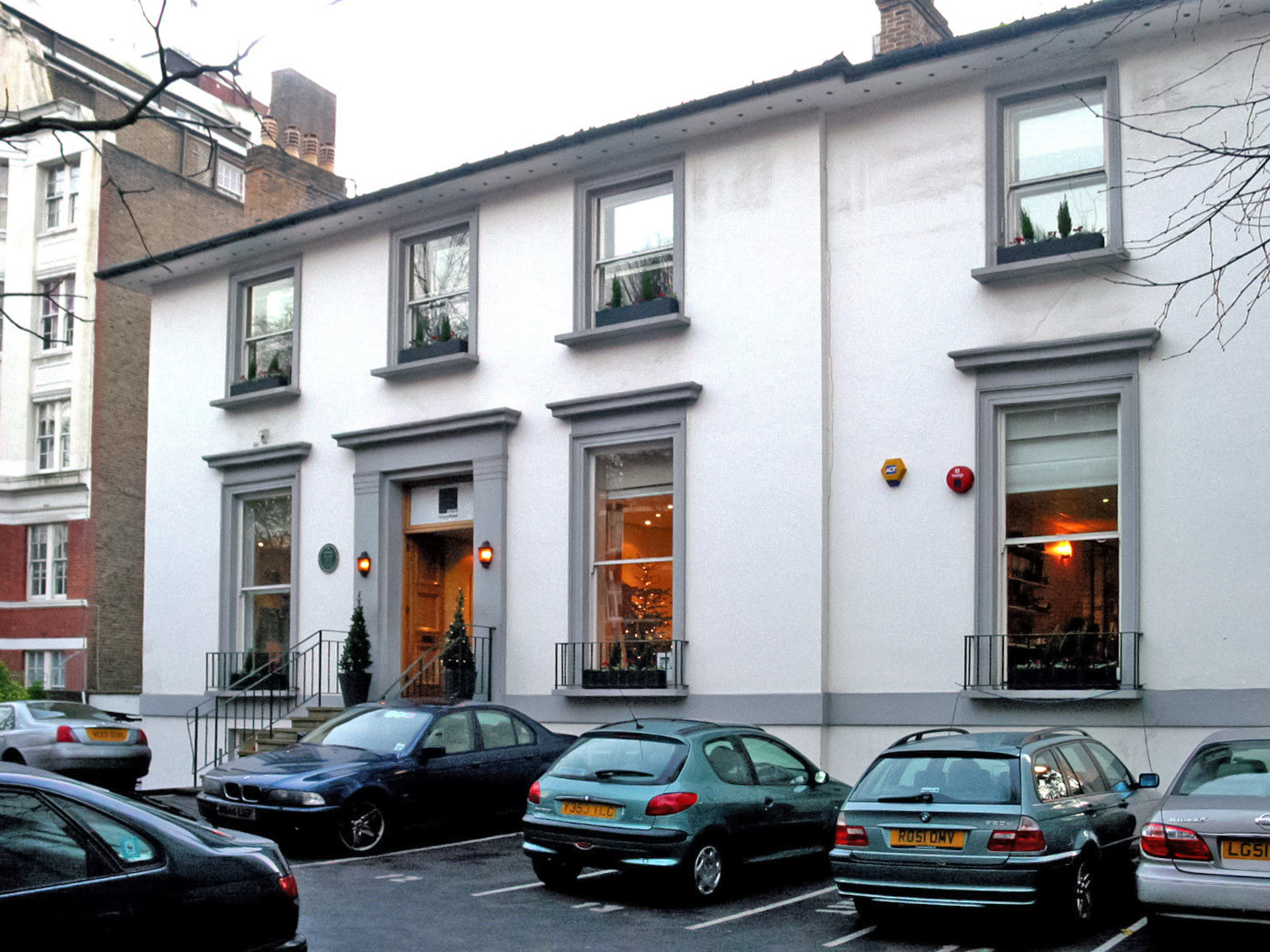
"Maxwell's Silver Hammer" was rehearsed at Twickenham Film Studios (pictured in 2010) in January 1969 during the sessions for Get Back. It was later recorded at EMI Studios (now part of Abbey Road Studios, pictured in 2005) in July 1969.

After the Twickenham rehearsals, the Beatles went into EMI's Studio Two (now part of Abbey Road Studios) on 9 July 1969 to record "Maxwell's Silver Hammer" for their eleventh studio album Abbey Road; George Martin produced the recording, and Phil McDonald and John Kurlander engineered it. (Note: The chroniclers Jean-Michel Guesdon and Philippe Margotin also note Tony Clark and Geoff Emerick as engineers and Alan Parsons as an assistant.) Lennon arrived to work on the song after a grievous car crash kept him from attending the previous sessions, but he was still too ill to participate at all. His wife Yoko Ono, who was also aboard the car, had been hurt while pregnant and lay on a large double bed in the studio. Takes one through twenty-one of "Maxwell's Silver Hammer" were recorded during this session, but takes six to ten were not numbered. These saw McCartney on piano, singing, Harrison on bass guitar, and Starr on drums. Emerick stated that McCartney wanted the bass to sound like a tuba, and he achieved that by "sliding into the notes instead of hitting them spot on". On the recording, he breaks out in laughter as he sings the line starting with "Writing fifty times". According to Lennon, McCartney saw potential in releasing "Maxwell's Silver Hammer" as a single; these plans were never addressed. McCartney, who habitually picked up refinements that could be made to a piece of music, laboured hard to better the song.

The band recorded the basic track within the first recording session and then overdubbed new parts onto take twenty-one. Throughout 10 and 11 July 1969, the Beatles continued to add overdubs. 10 July saw a nine-hour-long session, in which Martin added a Hammond organ to the transitions and introduction, McCartney doubled his vocals and devised another piano part, Harrison overdubbed various guitar parts, and an anvil was introduced. Most authors and scholars credit the latter to Starr, although some have asserted that the band's road manager Evans played the anvil. (Note: The Beatles' road manager Mal Evans played the anvil during the band's Get Back sessions in January 1969, but most sources state Starr played it during the sessions for Abbey Road, including Kevin Howlett in the Abbey Road (50th Anniversary Super Deluxe Version) booklet, Walter Everett, Mark Lewisohn, John C. Winn and Kenneth Womack. Ian MacDonald instead says it was played by Evans, as does Geoff Emerick in his autobiography. Philippe Margotin and Jean-Michel Guesdon are noncommittal, citing either Evans or Starr as the performer.) The engineer Geoff Emerick explains that Starr could not lift the bulky hammer and strike it onto the anvil in time, so Evans took over. Furthermore, McCartney and Harrison improvised scat vocals ("doo doo da doo doo") and joined Starr in singing the final line "Silver hammer man". Thirteen mixes for stereo were made by the end of the session. That day, McCartney politely asked Lennon to contribute some backing vocals, but he chose to sit in the back of the room next to Ono. On 11 July, Harrison added more overdubs to the chorus, and him and McCartney added additional vocals to the ending line. During the session, the band took a break from "Maxwell's Silver Hammer" and moved onto Harrison's "Something".

On 6 August, the Beatles returned to "Maxwell's Silver Hammer" to continue mixing and add overdubs. McCartney recorded his Moog synthesizer onto several takes of the song, with take twenty-seven yielding the best results. Ten stereo mixes were produced during the session, and more commenced on 12 August; Two days later, the stereo mix for "Maxwell's Silver Hammer" was complete. On 25 August, the master recording received its final edits; sound effects were created for the beginning of the song but went unused. In 2019, the song received a new stereo remix for inclusion on the 50th anniversary deluxe edition of Abbey Road. Martin's son Giles produced the new mix alongside Sam Okell.

The Beatles' relationships with one another soured during 1968's and 1969's recording sessions. McCartney said in a 1985 interview that the White Album marked a turning point and a source of friction between the group's members; he dubbed it "the tension album". While working on Abbey Road, however, they did not know their time as a band was approaching an end. (Note: Traditional works of Beatles scholarship such as Hunter Davies's Beatles Book state otherwise, but their account has since fallen out of favour. For example, MacDonald writes that the group, conscious of their fate, gave their assent for the medley mostly to close their career together with a majestic ending, a celebration.) (Note: Some people close to the Beatles had their suspicions. The sound engineeer Alan Parsons, who worked on Abbey Road, wrote in the foreword to Solid State (2019): "I also knew that, realistically speaking, Abbey Road would be the last time the Beatles would be the Beatles." Martin too sensed an unmistakable end to their partnership, and Ethan Russell gathered from the photoshoots for the album cover that "they were not a happy group". While he did not know for sure, Harrison said that "it felt as if we were reaching the end of the line".) Tony Clark, their engineer, remembered that by the time they were recording "Maxwell's Silver Hammer", he would not see the four Beatles together. Sessions for the song stirred up disapproval from Lennon, Harrison, and Starr due to McCartney's desire to perfect it much as he had done with "Ob-La-Di, Ob-La-Da" (1968).

I was very keen on it. It took a little bit long to record. I remember the guys getting p—ed [sic] with me. Occasionally, I, in particular, would take too long, 'cause I was trying to get what was in my head.

— McCartney on the recording of "Maxwell's Silver Hammer", as reported in American Songwriter

According to Womack, Lennon once said the Beatles would be guaranteed a vast audience if they kept releasing "nice little folk songs like 'Maxwell’s Silver Hammer' for the grannies to dig". He discussed it in a 1980 interview with David Sheff:

That's Paul's. I hate it. 'Cuz [sic] all I remember is the track – he made us do it a hundred million times. He did everything to make it into a single and it never was and it never could've been, but he put guitar licks on it and he had somebody hitting iron pieces and we spent more money on that song then any of them in the whole album. I think.

They got annoyed because Maxwell's Silver Hammer took three days to record. Big deal.

— McCartney, in The Beatles Anthology

Starr similarly told Rolling Stone in 2008: "The worst session ever was 'Maxwell's Silver Hammer.' It was the worst track we ever had to record. It went on for fucking weeks. I thought it was mad." In a 1977 interview with Crawdaddy, Harrison recalled: "Sometimes Paul would make us do these really fruity songs. I mean, my god, 'Maxwell's Silver Hammer' was so fruity." He observed on another occasion: "[The song] is something of Paul's which we'd spend a hell of a lot of time on and it is one of those instant whistle-type of tunes which, I suppose, some people will hate and some people will really love." It took the band five recording sessions to complete the song. MacDonald stated that out of all the band's recordings, that of "Maxwell's Silver Hammer" best demonstrates why the Beatles split apart.

== Release and critical reception ==
Abbey Road was released on 26 September 1969 in the United Kingdom through Apple Records. "Maxwell's Silver Hammer" appears as the third track on side one, between "Something" and "Oh! Darling". The unused fifth take of "Maxwell's Silver Hammer" was released on Anthology 3 in 1996, and the twelfth take featured on Abbey Road's 50th anniversary edition in 2019. In 2022, McCartney's handwritten lyrics for the song were put up for auction with a starting price of $425,000 USD.

In a contemporary review of the album, Alan Smith comments on its "instantly-remembered" storyline – the hapless Maxwell always struck with ill fate whenever he tries to do as he wishes: "'I'm a Loser' is Max's theme, but with McCartney's flavour here is more of a Gideon's Bible." In contrast, Roger Chapman of Melody Maker called the song a "drag" and juxtaposed it unfavourably with "When I'm Sixty-Four" (1967). Mike Jahn labelled it as a "light singalong" akin to songs like "When I'm Sixty-Four" and "Yellow Submarine". Rolling Stone's John Mendelsohn argues that McCartney and Ray Davies are the only songwriters who could have composed "Maxwell's Silver Hammer", a song he describes as a "jaunty vaudevillian music-hallish celebration". Miles of Oz said that the song was "a complex little piece" and "a perfect example of Paul's combination of American rock with British brass band music".

"Maxwell's Silver Hammer" is one of those songs which inspires partisan feelings among listeners; you either love it or you hate it.

— Mark Lewisohn, 1988

According to the Beatles biographer Nicholas Schaffner, "Maxwell's Silver Hammer" is one of McCartney's "kinkiest songs", writing that its story renders the acts of a serial killer "as merry and gay as a romp around the mulberry bush". On the other hand, the biographer Simon Leng considers it "nauseating and bizarre". MacDonald dismissed it as "sniggering nonsense" in his book Revolution in the Head (2007). More positively, Unterberger writes that the plot of "Maxwell's Silver Hammer" is "amusing" for a pop rock song, while Mark Hertsgaard, comparing it to "Ob-La-Di, Ob-La-Da", deems it "too sweet". Hunter Davies dismisses those who grow vexed at "just a song ... if hardly a classic".

Ranking every Beatles song from worst to best, Bill Wyman of Vulture placed it at number 182, referring to the song as "catchy as hell" and highlighting the anvil sound. Michael Gallucci, writing for Ultimate Classic Rock, ranked it at number 157, and Mark Beaumont of NME listed it at number 149; the latter remarked: "You've written some of the finest children's songs of the century, why the hell shouldn't you try to make a vaudevillian family singalong from the story of an insane, hammer wielding psychopath?" Rolling Stone included "Maxwell's Silver Hammer" in its 2025 list of "50 Terrible Songs on Great Albums", calling its concept and storyline "crazy" and the time the Beatles spent to finish it "even crazier". They also questioned why it was chosen for Abbey Road over certain songs that Harrison had written, such as "All Things Must Pass".

== Cover versions ==
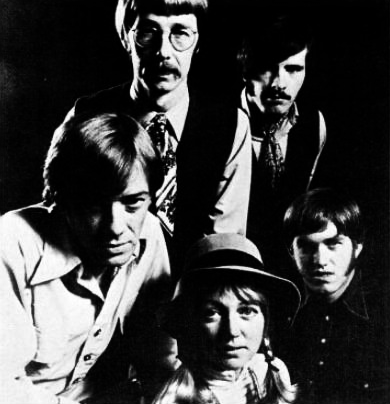
The Canadian soft rock band the Bells (pictured 1970) released a cover of "Maxwell's Silver Hammer" as a single in 1972.

The film composer George Fenton released a rendition of "Maxwell's Silver Hammer" as his debut single in 1969. Produced by Mike Leander, it peaked at number six on Sweden's Kvällstoppen charts and at number one on Tio i Topp in January 1970. In 1978, Steve Martin covered "Maxwell's Silver Hammer" for the soundtrack album Sgt. Pepper's Lonely Hearts Club Band, and the Canadian soft rock band the Bells released their version as a single in 1972.

Frankie Laine recorded it for the 1976 musical documentary All This and World War II. In 2015, the MonaLisa Twins released a cover of "Maxwell's Silver Hammer"; John Sinkevics of Local Spins names it one of the best covers of an Abbey Road track. Brad Mehldau included a recording on his live album Your Mother Should Know: Brad Mehldau Plays The Beatles (2023). The composer John Rutter covered "Maxwell's Silver Hammer" along with five other Beatles songs for his 1979 album The Beatles Concerto.

== Personnel ==
According to Kevin Howlett, except where noted:

The Beatles

- Paul McCartney – lead and harmony vocals, piano, acoustic guitar, Moog synthesizer
- George Harrison – harmony vocal, bass guitar, electric guitars
- Ringo Starr – harmony vocal, drums, anvil

Additional musician

- George Martin – Hammond organ
