= Hocus-pocus =

Magic phrase

Hocus-pocus is a reference to the actions of magicians, often as the stereotypical magic words spoken when bringing about some sort of change. It was once a common term for a magician, juggler, or other similar entertainers. In extended usage, the term is often used (pejoratively) to describe irrational human activities that appear to depend on magic. Examples are given below.

== History ==
The earliest known English-language work on magic, or what was then known as legerdemain (sleight of hand), was published anonymously in 1635 under the title Hocus Pocus Junior: The Anatomie of Legerdemain. Further research suggests that "Hocus Pocus" was the stage name of a well known magician of the era. This may be William Vincent, who is recorded as having been granted a license to perform magic in England in 1619. Whether he was the author of the book is unknown.

== Conjectured origins ==
The origins of the term remain obscure. The most popular conjecture is that it is a garbled Latin religious phrase or some form of 'dog' Latin. Some have associated it with similar-sounding fictional, mythical, or legendary names. Others suggest it is merely a combination of nonsense words.

=== Latin and pseudo-Latin origins ===
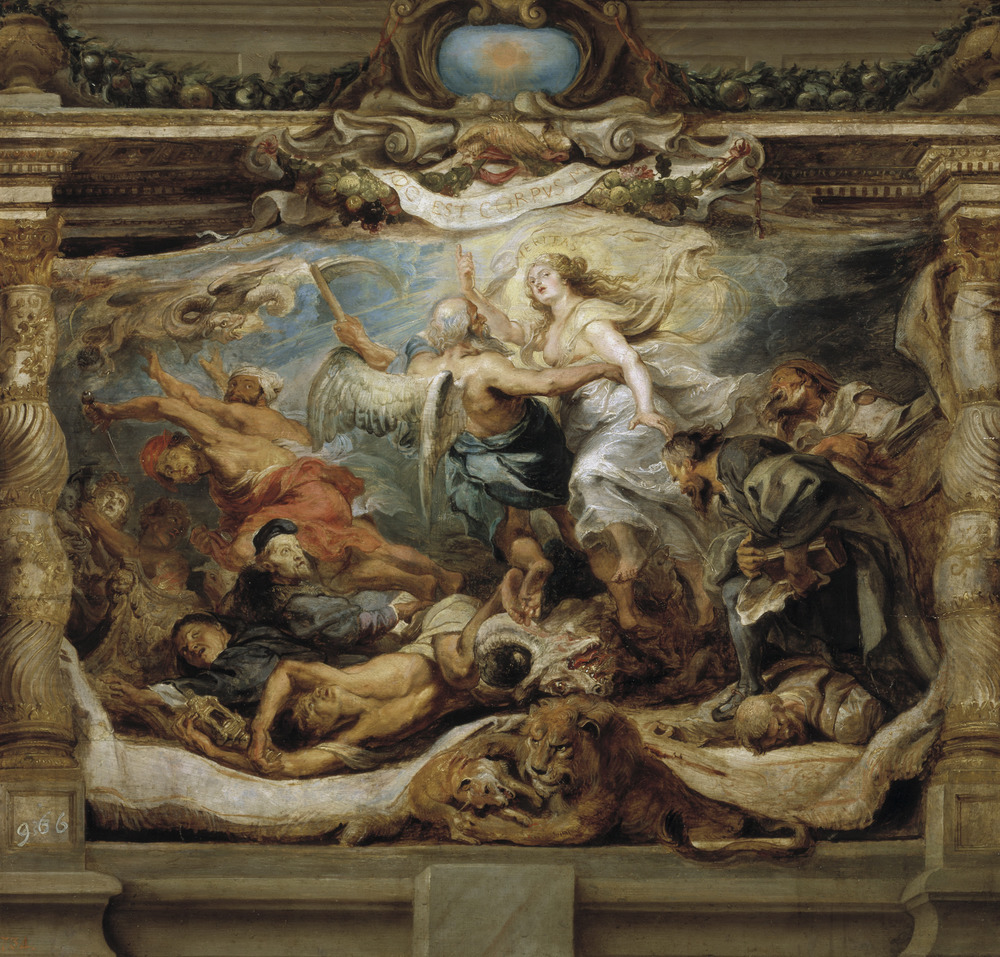
Painting titled Hoc est corpus, for a set of tapestries celebrating the Eucharist, by Peter Paul Rubens, circa 1625

One theory is that the term is a corruption of hax pax max Deus adimax, a pseudo-Latin phrase used in the early 17th century as a magical formula by conjurors.

Another theory is that it is a corruption or parody of the Consecration in the Catholic Mass, which contains the phrase "Hoc est enim corpus meum" ("This is my Body"), in reference to the Catholic belief in transubstantiation. This explanation goes at least as far back as a 1694 speculation by the Anglican prelate John Tillotson:

In all probability those common juggling words of hocus pocus are nothing else but a corruption of hoc est corpus, by way of ridiculous imitation of the priests of the Church of Rome in their trick of Transubstantiation.

This theory is supported by the fact that in the Netherlands, the words Hocus pocus are usually accompanied by the additional words pilatus pas, said to be based on a post-Reformation parody of both the Consecration and the Credo, which reads in part, "…sub Pontio Pilato passus et sepultus est" ("…under Pontius Pilate he suffered and was buried”). Similarly from the Nicene Creed, the phrase is in Scandinavia is usually accompanied by filiokus, a corruption of the term Filioque, ("and from the Son”). The variant spelling filipokus is common in Russia, a predominantly Eastern Orthodox nation, as well as certain other post-Soviet states, while the word for "stage trick" in Russian, fokus, is derived from hocus pocus.

=== Magician's name ===
Others believe that it is an appeal to the folkloric Norse magician Ochus Bochus:

It is possible that we here see the origin of hocus pocus, and Old Nick.

According to Sharon Turner in The History of the Anglo-Saxons, they were believed to be derived from Ochus Bochus, a magician and demon of the north.

=== Nonsense word ===
As an alternative to other theories, it may simply be pseudo-Latin with no meaning, made up to impress people:

I will speak of one man... that went about in King James his time ... who called himself, "The Kings Majesties most excellent Hocus Pocus", and so was he called, because that at the playing of every Trick, he used to say, "Hocus pocus, tontus talontus, vade celeriter jubeo", a dark composure of words, to blinde the eyes of the beholders, to make his Trick pass the more currently without discovery, because when the eye and the ear of the beholder are both earnestly busied, the Trick is not so easily discovered, nor the Imposture discerned.

— Thomas Ady, A Candle in the Dark, 1656

== See also ==
- Abracadabra
- Barbarous name

== External resources ==
- Hocus Pocus or The Whole art of Legerdemain. From the Marion S. Carson Collection in the Rare Book and Special Collection Division at the Library of Congress
- Hocus Pocus Junior: the Anatomie of Legerdemain From the Harry Houdini Collection in the Rare Book and Special Collection Division at the Library of Congress
