= Convivium Records =

British independent record label

Convivium Records is a British independent record label and record self-releasing house established by Adrian Green in 2010.

The label records, masters, markets and distributes choral and instrumental music for predominantly British, European and American artists, composers and ensembles. An in-house recording choir, the Convivium Singers, provides support for larger force vocal recordings.

The label has produced albums with choirs including Polyphony, the Choir of Royal Holloway, Sansara, Sofia Vokalensemble, the Cathedral Singers of Christ Church Oxford, Celestia Singers, Excelsis, Jervaulx Singers, Oriel College Chapel Choir, Phoenix Consort, Sospiri, The Charter Choir of Homerton College, Cambridge, Ars Nova, Winchester College Chapel Choir, Portsmouth Grammar School Chamber Choir, Portsmouth Cathedral Choir, the Hogan Ensemble.

The label has recorded with many ensembles, including the London Mozart Players, Britten Sinfonia, Southern Sinfonia, American Contemporary Music Ensemble, Florisma, the Atchison Quartet, Fidelio Trio, the English Cornett and Sackbut Ensemble, Camarilla Ensemble, Ivory Piano Duo, Korros Ensemble, London Piano Trio, Onyx Brass, the Hennessey Brown Music Collective, Tippett Quartet.

The label has worked with numerous artists, including conductors Stephen Layton, Marin Alsop, Adam Whitmore, Ben Lamb, Bengt Ollén, Charlie Gower-Smith, Daniel Trocmé-Latter, David Bray, David Maw, David Ogden, Eamonn Dougan, Hilary Campbell, Katy Lavinia Cooper, Robert Lewis and Rupert Gough, pianists Martin Cousin, Panayotis Archontides, Natalie Tsaldarakis, Lynn Arnold, Marija Jankova Noller Steven Graff and Jonathan Powell, countertenor James Bowman, soprano Penelope Appleyard, organists Alexander Pott, Alessandro MacKinnon-Botti, Cathy Lamb, David Bannister, David Goode, Kevin Bowyer, Lorenzo Bennett, Malcolm Archer, Martin Baker, Ronny Krippner, Sebastian Thomson, Shanna Hart, Simon Earl and Simon Hogan, and by contemporary American and British composers, Clive Osgood, Matthew Coleridge, Jonathan Dove, Philip Moore, Alexander Campkin, Alexander L'Estrange, Anthony Caesar, Becky McGlade, Bob Chilcott, Brian Knowles, Carson Cooman, Cecilia McDowall, Cheryl Frances-Hoad, Dan Locklair, David Bednall, Elena Pavlea, George Arthur Richford, June Clark, Lawrence Rose, Margaret Rizza, Hugh Shrapnel, John Carbon, Arnold Rosner, Richard Carr, David Price, Thomas Hewitt Jones, John White, Will Todd, Rob Keeley and Hugh Benham.

== Artist Roster ==
Accurate (not exhaustive!) with respect to Convivium Records' website as of 13 September 2017.

- Stephen Layton
- Polyphony
- The Choir of Royal Holloway
- Rupert Gough
- The Tippett Quartet
- John White
- Jonathan Powell
- Sansara
- Winchester College Chapel Choir
- English Cornett and Sackbut Ensemble
- London Mozart Players
- Hogan Ensemble
- Malcolm Archer
- Joe Waggott
- Apollo Baroque Consort
- Portsmouth Cathedral Choir
- Hugh Benham
- The School of Economic Science's Discantvs Choir
- Rob Keeley
- Convivium Singers
- Neil Ferris
- Fidelio Trio
- Rowland Sutherland
- James Bowman

== See also ==
- List of record labels
- List of independent UK record labels
