= Exultate Singers =

- Origin: Bristol, United Kingdom
- Genres: Choral
- Occupation: Choir
- Years active: 14
- Members: Conductor; David Ogden
- Website: www.exultatesingers.org

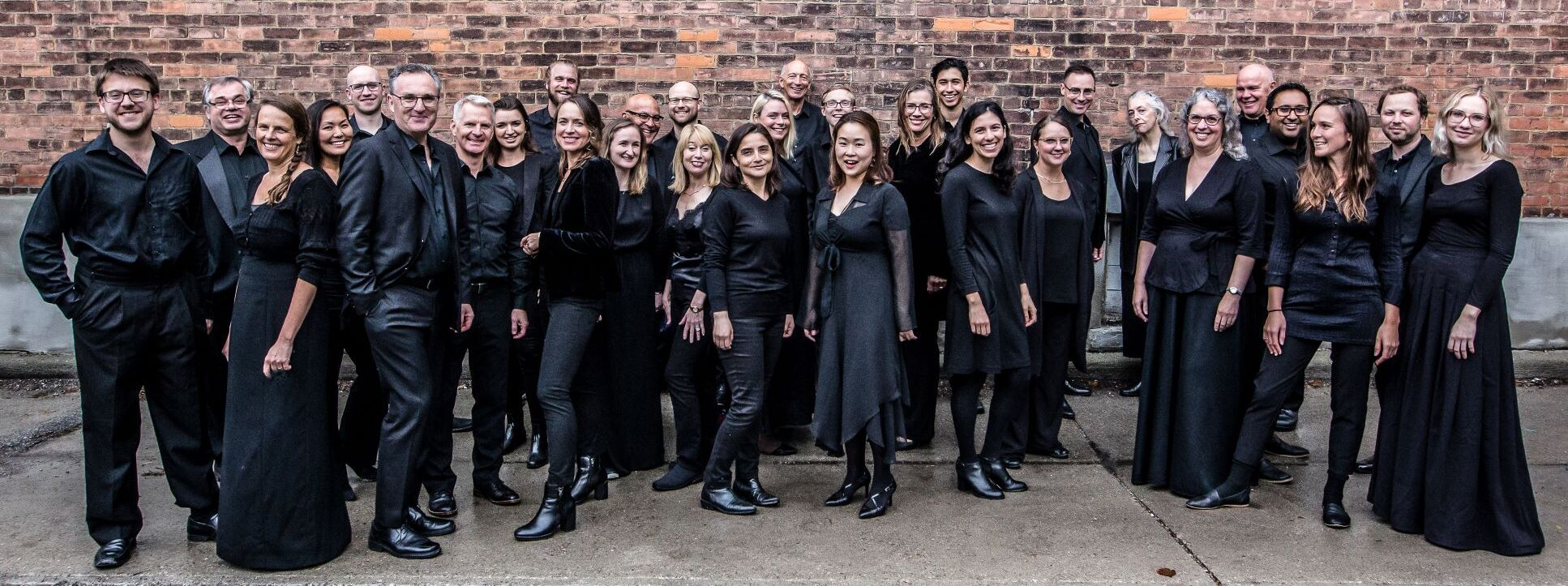
Exultate Choir in 2018

Exultate Singers is a choir based in Bristol, UK, made up of 40 adult singers. It has mostly specialised in Christian sacred music.

== History ==
Exultate Singers was founded in September 2002 by David Ogden to sing a live broadcast of Sunday Worship on BBC Radio 4.

Since its inaugural broadcast, Exultate Singers has made several further appearances on BBC Radio and Television, including BBC Radio 4's Sunday Worship, a live broadcast from St Martin-in-the-Fields on BBC Radio 4 for Ascension Day in 2005, BBC Radio 2's Sunday Half Hour, BBC Radio 3's The Choir, BBC Radio 3's "In Tune" and BBC One's Songs Of Praise

The choir also performs live in concerts in Bristol, around the South West and further afield. Notable performances have included James MacMillan's Seven Last Words from the Cross; Johann Sebastian Bach's Mass in B minor and St Matthew Passion; Roxanna Panufnik's Westminster Mass; Alessandro Scarlatti's St Cecilia Mass of 1721; and Duke Ellington's Sacred Concert. In November 2009 the choir commissioned Roxanna Panufnik to write a piece to commemorate the 20th anniversary of the fall of the Berlin Wall. Her piece, All Shall be Well, is scored for double choir and solo cello and was premiered in Clifton Cathedral, Bristol on Sunday 9 November 2009. It is the title track of the choir's third CD, All Shall be Well, released on the Naxos Records label in 2012. The concert also included the first UK performance of Petr Eben's work for unaccompanied choir, Bitter Earth, sung in Czech.

In November 2012, Exultate Singers was selected by the BBC to represent the UK in the international choir competition, Let the Peoples Sing 2013.

== David Ogden ==
David Ogden is conductor and creative director of Exultate Singers. He founded the choir in 2002. He is also the conductor of City of Bristol Choir and was conductor of the Millennium Youth Choir from 2005 to 2014.

== Recordings ==
Exultate Singers has recorded five CDs:

- Visions of Peace (2005)
- A Time for Singing (recorded and produced by John Rutter in 2008)
- All Shall Be Well for the Naxos Records label (2012)
- A Sense of the Divine (2013)
- Carols by Candlelight (2015)
