= Twickenham Choral Society =

Large auditioned amateur choir based in SW London, England

- Choir
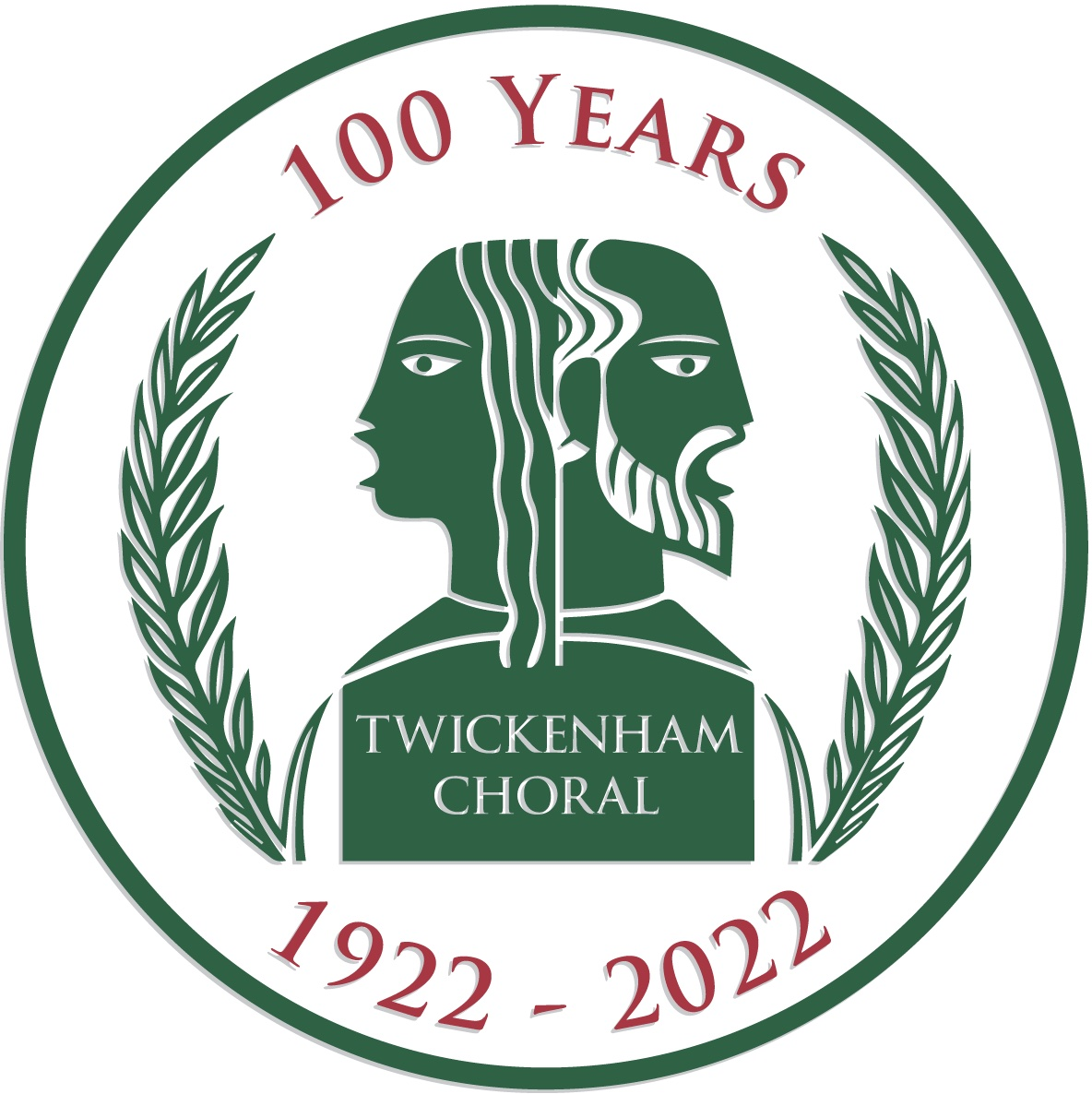
- Twickenham Choral Society centenary commemoration logo
- Founded: October 1921
- Genre: Classical
- Music director: Howard Ionascu
- Website: www.twickenhamchoral.org.uk/index.php

Twickenham Choral Society (known today as Twickenham Choral) is a large, auditioned, mixed-voice, choir based in Twickenham, considered to be South West London's premier amateur choir. Twickenham Choral is best known for the excellence and frequency of its performances, which it has been delivering to local community and international audiences for over 100 years.

== Beginnings ==
There has been a Twickenham Choral Society since the mid-19th century, staging songs in Twickenham and around London, performing debuts from composers of the day, as well as presenting much larger choral works. The choir thrived until World War I, when all trace of it disappears from the literature. Today's choir was founded in October 1921 (Note: called the Twickenham Musical Society from 1922, the choir was renamed the Twickenham Choral Society in 1977) and included both choral and orchestral sections, with the first post-war public performance in March 1922. In its early years, the choir worked in association with the Royal Military School of Music (RMSM) at Kneller Hall under the direction of Charles Thornton Lofthouse. In 1927, Hector Adkins, the Director of Music at Kneller Hall, became the conductor, until the outbreak of war in 1939 when the hall closed down. The choir continued performing until late 1942, when activities were suspended for the duration of the war.

The Twickenham Choral Society reformed in 1946 with its orchestra, renewing the relationship with the RMSM, which provided an ample supply of male vocalists and instrumentalists, which other choirs lacked. The partnership didn't last long, however, and from 1954, Braden Hunwick led the choir through a series of Elgar works but without a permanent orchestra, occasionally linking up with the Kneller Hall Band and Trumpeters. Martin Neary continued the arrangement until 1972, when John Lubbock became the conductor and brought in the Orchestra of St John's Smith Square. In 1974, Christopher Herrick, a notable concert organist who studied conducting under Sir Adrian Boult, took up the baton for the choir, bringing in professional orchestral partnership with the Brandenburg Orchestras, (Note: the Brandenburg Sinfonia and Brandenburg Baroque Soloists) and restoring the name of the choir to the Twickenaham Choral Society in 1977. Herrick combined forces with the Whitehall Choir to perform in Westminster Abbey and the Royal Albert Hall, notably a Verdi Requiem with six choirs totalling 500 singers. Herrick retired from the choir as Conductor in 2024 after fifty years, succeeded by Howard Ionascu.

Over the last century, the choir has hosted many notable members and performers, such as Noël Coward, Richard Watson, Rae Woodland, Barry Wordsworth, Peter Gellhorn, Sophie Bevan, Mary Bevan, Peter Auty, Sarah Fox, as well as Isobel Baillie, Janet Baker, James Bowman, John Carol Case, Stephen Cleobury, Brian Kay, Philip Langridge, Felicity Lott, Jean Rigby, John Shirley-Quirk, Roderick Williams, Barry Wordsworth, Maurice Bevan, Timothy West and Prunella Scales.

== The choir today ==
The choir stages three to four concerts each year with professional musicians and soloists. Many of these concerts are held locally at the Landmark Arts Centre in Teddington, with St Martin-in-the-Fields and Cadogan Hall providing the main venue in the West End of London. The choir is led by the conductor (Howard Ionascu), supported by an assistant conductor (Daniel King Smith), who also accompanies rehearsals. The conductor contributes to the choice of music to be performed, auditions new and existing members, (Note: repeated auditions are unusual for amateur choirs; auditions were introduced by Christopher Herrick "signalling that the choir is serious in its musical ambitions") directs rehearsals, interpreting the score by setting the tempo and the dynamics, ensuring correct entries by ensemble members, and "shaping" the phrasing where appropriate. The choir performs popular oratorios, as well as lesser known Renaissance to present day pieces. Eminent Composers of the day occasionally debut their own work with the choir, with premières by Holloway, Spicer, Farrington, Panufnik and others. The choir maintains a busy schedule today, performing around London, (Note: e.g. St Martin-in-the-Fields, St John's, Smith Square, Cadogan Hall) and touring European cities from Paris to Prague, from Budapest to Salamanca.

=== Governance ===
The charitable purpose of the society is the promotion of the public education in the art and science of Choral music by the presentation of public concerts and recitals. The choir achieves this by staging several performances a year around London and Europe, participating in music festivals and commissioning music. The Society is administered by a committee of 12 elected volunteers, with three elected Trustees who govern the UK registered charity. Trustees 2024/25 are:

1. Chair – Helen Coulson
2. Secretary – Gillian Zettle
3. Treasurer – Timothy Lidbetter

Trustees and committee members are elected at an Annual general meeting, held to review a statement of accounts and any notices appropriate to general governance. The choir is funded by subscriptions, box office takings, grants and sponsorship. The choir has a patron/president, who provides tone and visibility to the choir and is currently Tristan Fry.
