= Patrick Gale =

British novelist

Patrick Gale FRSL
- Born: 31 January 1962 (age 64) Isle of Wight
- Occupation: Novelist
- Education: Winchester College; New College, Oxford

Patrick Evelyn Hugh Sadler Gale (born 31 January 1962) is a British novelist.

== Early life and education ==
Gale was born in 1962 on the Isle of Wight, the youngest of four children. His father was the prison governor of HM Prison Camp Hill on the Isle of Wight, and he was brought up in and around prisons. In 1969 the family moved to Winchester and his father became Under-Secretary of State for Prisons. In his 2000 novel Rough Music, the lead character is the son of a prison governor.

In Winchester he was invited to join the Quiristers in the Winchester College Chapel Choir. Before he turned ten, one of his siblings suffered a nervous breakdown and his mother almost died in a car accident that left her brain-damaged. He was then educated at Winchester College and New College, Oxford.

== Career ==
His first two novels, The Aerodynamics of Pork and Ease, were published on the same day in 1985. In 2017 he made his screenwriting debut with Man in an Orange Shirt, a two part original drama which formed part of the BBC's Gay Britannia season. The show won the 2018 International Emmy for Best Miniseries.

His 2000 novel Rough Music is the most widely held of his books in libraries: in 2018 it was owned by 673 libraries, according to WorldCat.

Describing himself as the "last novelist in England", he has lived in Cornwall since 1988, a county described repeatedly in his novels. Until September 2024, he was artistic director of the North Cornwall Book Festival, which he helped found. He is a patron of the Charles Causley Trust, the Penzance LitFest, and Literature Works.

Gale was elected a Fellow of the Royal Society of Literature in 2021.

== Personal life ==
Gale lives on a farm near Land's End, with his husband, the sculptor-farmer Aidan Hicks. There they raise beef cattle and grow barley. He is a keen gardener and in April 2024 his garden at Land's End was featured on BBC's Gardeners' World.

== Novels and short stories ==
- The Aerodynamics of Pork (1985)
- Ease (1985)
- Kansas in August (1987)
- Facing the Tank (1988)
- Little Bits of Baby (1989)
- The Cat Sanctuary (1990)
- Caesar's Wife (1991) – novella contained in the collection Secret Lives, along with works by Tom Wakefield and Francis King
- The Facts of Life (1996)
- Dangerous Pleasures (1996) – short stories
- Tree Surgery for Beginners (1999)
- Rough Music (2000)
- A Sweet Obscurity (2003)
- Friendly Fire (2005)
- Notes from an Exhibition (2007)
- The Whole Day Through (2009)
- Gentleman's Relish (2009) – short stories
- A Perfectly Good Man (2012)
- A Place Called Winter (2015)
- Take Nothing With You (2018)
- Mother’s Boy (2022)
- Love Lane (2026)
