= Paul Micou =

American novelist

- Born: April 22, 1959 (age 67); San Francisco, California, U.S.
- Education: Harvard University
- Occupation: Novelist
- Children: 2

Paul Micou (born April 22, 1959) is an American novelist. Born in San Francisco, part of his childhood was spent in Turkey and Iran, as well as Washington, D.C., and Connecticut. After graduating from Harvard in 1981 he lived in Paris, and then moved to London in 1988. As of 2012, he was living in France with his wife and two sons.

Paul Micou's first novel The Music Programme (1989) is a comic satire on the comfortable lifestyles of overpaid international development workers. Set in a fictional African country called Timbali, the novel was published to favourable reviews. The New York Times called it "an excellent, accomplished example" of satirical fiction and compared his comic talents to those of Evelyn Waugh and William Boyd. This novel was composed as an opera by UK composer Roxanna Panufnik which premiered in 2000 at the Polish National Opera, Teatr Wielki, Warsaw.

== Novels ==
- The Music Programme (1989)
- The Cover Artist (1990)
- The Death of David Debrizzi (1991)
- Rotten Times (1992)
- The Last Word (1993)
- Adam's Wish (1994)
- The Leper's Bell (2000)
- Confessions of a Map Dealer (2008)
- How to Get into Harvard (2013)
