= City of Bristol Choir =

British musical group

The City of Bristol Choir is a mixed voice choir of around 85 auditioned singers, whose aim is to sing a wide range of choral music to the highest possible standard.

== Description ==
The choir gives five or six concerts a year in different venues around the South West, but mostly in Bristol. The choir's size gives it flexibility to perform music in diverse styles, from intimate Renaissance music polyphony and partsongs to large-scale works with orchestra.

== History ==
City of Bristol Choir was formed in 1991 by Malcolm Archer (now organist and director of music at Winchester College). The choir now enjoys a busy schedule of concerts and events under the direction of David Ogden, who was appointed Director of Music in 2000.

Recent seasons have included performances of Szymanowski's Stabat Mater, Brahms' Requiem, three major Elgar oratorios – The Apostles, The Dream of Gerontius and The Kingdom.and Mozart's Mass in C Minor, as well as a summer concert of jazz standards.

In October 2006, City of Bristol Choir visited Portugal for its first European tour where it gave two concerts and sang at morning mass at the magnificent Lapa Church in Porto. They have toured to Florence in 2008 since.

In 2009 the choir held a Handel 250 festival, which included three concerts and a performance of the enthralling Dixit Dominus, and his rarely performed Dettingham Te Deum. The next milestone for the choir will be Beethoven's Ninth Symphony: one of the greatest of all works.
