= Iain Farrington =

British musician

Iain Farrington (born 1977) is a British pianist, organist, composer and arranger. He performs regularly with some of the country's leading singers, instrumentalists and choirs, as well as giving solo recitals.

== Biography ==
=== Early years and education ===
Farrington studied piano at the Royal Academy of Music, London and was Organ Scholar at St George's Chapel, Windsor Castle and Organ Scholar at St John's College, Cambridge. As a solo pianist, accompanist, chamber musician and organist, he has performed at Wigmore Hall, Queen Elizabeth Hall, the Purcell Room, the BBC Proms, the Royal Opera House, and in the US, Japan, South Africa, and across Europe.

=== Career ===
Farrington played the piano at the opening ceremony of the London 2012 Olympics, performing "Chariots of Fire" with Rowan Atkinson (as Mr. Bean), the London Symphony Orchestra and Sir Simon Rattle (and appeared as a runner in Mr. Bean's dream sequence). He has made two solo piano recordings featuring his own compositions and arrangements, Fiesta! and Piano Songs. His solo performance in the Proms 2007 on the Royal Albert Hall organ was critically acclaimed. In 2013 he featured as a piano soloist in Howard Goodall's 'Story of Music' on BBC Television. He has performed the organ works of Schoenberg in concerts for the Schoenberg family in Los Angeles. At the Queen Elizabeth Hall, London he performed Ligeti's Continuum for solo harpsichord in 2012.

As a composer, Farrington has written orchestral, choral and chamber works. His orchestral work Wing It was composed for the Wallace and Gromit Prom in 2012. His choral work The Burning Heavens premiered with Twickenham Choral in 2009 and was nominated for a British Composer Award in 2010. His organ suite, Fiesta!, has been performed extensively and recorded several times. His organ work Animal Parade has been recorded and was featured at the 2011 Lord Mayor's Show in St Paul's Cathedral, London, with narration by Brian Blessed.

In 2023, he was one of twelve composers asked to write a new piece for the coronation of Charles III and Camilla. His composition for organ, Voices of the World, incorporated tunes from countries of the Commonwealth and was performed before the coronation ceremony began.

At the Bridgewater Hall in June 2025, for the final concert of Manchester Classical 2025, Farrington's orchestral and choral work Street Party received its world premiere. The work was performed by the BBC Philharmonic Orchestra, members of the Hallé, Manchester Collective, RNCM ensemble, as well as the ENO Chorus and Hallé Choir.

Farrington was made a Fellow of the Royal Academy of Music (FRAM) at a ceremony in July 2025.

In July 2025, Farrington's work The Talk of the Town was performed by the Hitchin Chamber Orchestra. The orchestra commissioned the work for its tenth anniversary. Farrington, who was born and bred in Hitchin, Hertfordshire, wrote the five-movement work about five different aspects of the town.

=== Arrangements ===
Farrington has made numerous arrangements for orchestra, choir and chamber ensemble. He has made many arrangements of the music of Edward Elgar. His arrangement of Elgar's Pomp and Circumstance March No. 5 was performed at the 2011 Royal Wedding, while his arrangement of Elgar's Pomp and Circumstance March No. 4 was performed at the 2023 Coronation. His other organ arrangements of Elgar have been recorded at Westminster Abbey by Robert Quinney. Farrington has made a version of Elgar's Concert Allegro for piano and orchestra which he has recorded, as well as his solo piano arrangement of Elgar's 2nd Symphony. He has also transcribed Elgar's Five Piano Improvisations and made piano versions of Falstaff, the 1st Symphony, and the Elgar/Payne 3rd Symphony.

He is the Arranger in Residence for the Aurora Orchestra, and has made many reduced versions of orchestral and choral works for chamber ensembles. Orchestral works include Bernstein's Symphonic Dances from West Side Story, Brahms Hungarian Dance No. 5 (performed at the Proms 2010), Mahler's 1st Symphony, Das Lied von der Erde and Lieder eines fahrenden Gesellen. He has also done arrangements/reductions of opera scores including Dvorak's Rusalka, Janáček's The Cunning Little Vixen and Tippett's King Priam. Choral works arranged include Bach's Christ lag in Todesbanden (for English Touring Opera) and Brahms A German Requiem.

For the Bastille Day celebration concert in Paris on 14th July 2025, Farrington made an arrangement of Saudade Fez Um Samba, a composition by Carlos Lyra and Ronaldo Bôscoli. It was performed by the Orchestre National de France with La Maîtrise de Radio France and the Brazilian cellist and vocalist Dom La Nena.

==== BBC Proms ====
Farrington orchestrated and arranged all the songs for the Horrible Histories Prom in 2011. He was commissioned to compose a "mash-up" piece for the 2020 Proms season based on Beethoven's Nine Symphonies. It was recorded by all the five BBC orchestras and the BBC Singers in a "Grand Virtual Orchestra" of some 350 performers and was broadcast on BBC Four on 19 July 2020.

In 2024, Farrington composed a piece for the Last Night of the Proms called Extra Time. The piece, a BBC Commission, which was written during the final week of the 2024 Paris Olympic Games, is a celebration of sports as well as famous sporting TV themes, and was performed by the BBC Symphony Orchestra, conducted by Sakari Oramo.
