= Carson Cooman =

American composer and organist

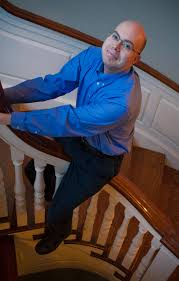
Carson Cooman

Carson Pierce Cooman (born June 12, 1982) is an American composer and organist.

Cooman was born in Rochester, New York on June 12, 1982. He was introduced to music by his grandmother who taught music and was a graduate of Eastman School of Music. Cooman began taking piano and organ lesson at an early age, and began composing aged 8. As a teenager, he set up his own software company. He attended Allendale Columbia School, followed by Harvard University, where he received a Bachelor of Arts, and then Carnegie Mellon University where he graduated with a Master of Music. Cooman studied composition with Bernard Rands and Judith Weir.

Cooman's compositions have been recorded for Naxos Records, Convivium Records, Albany Records, Métier Records, Divine Art Records, Gothic Records and Artek Recordings (with distribution by Naxos).

Cooman writes on music, having been a contributor to the music publication Fanfare. He is currently composer-in-residence at Harvard Memorial Church.

== Selected discography of Cooman compositions ==
- 2007 - Carson Cooman: Symphonies Nos. 2 & 3, Naxos Records American Classics
- 2007 - Carson Cooman: Piano Music, Naxos Records American Classics
- 2008 - Carson Cooman: Sacred Choral Music, Naxos Records American Classics
- 2008 - New Dawn: Song Cycles and Piano Music of Carson Cooman, Albany Records
- 2010 - Carson Cooman: Nantucket Dreaming, Naxos Records American Classics
- 2011 - Wild Sunrises: Organ Music of Carson Cooman
- 2012 - The Welcome News: Choral Music of Carson Cooman, Gothic Records
- 2014 - The Evening Choir: Sacred Choral Music by Carson Cooman, Convivium Records
- 2015 - Masque - Music for Organ by Carson Cooman, Divine Art Records
- 2021 - As We Are Changed (Oratorio by Cooman and Euan Tait), Convivium Records

== Works ==
- 2011 - Carson Cooman: Organ Music Vol VI, Wayne Leupold Editions

== See also ==
- M. Power, "A Minimum of Means". Choir and Organ 15 (2007), pp. 15–17.
