= Roxanna Panufnik =

British composer (born 1968)

Roxanna Panufnik OBE
- Born: 24 April 1968 (age 58); London, England
- Occupation: Composer
- Website: roxannapanufnik.com

Roxanna Anna Macklow Smith OBE (née Panufnik; born 24 April 1968) is a British composer. She is the daughter of the Polish composer and conductor Sir Andrzej Panufnik and his second wife Camilla, née Jessel.

Panufnik was born in London. She attended Bedales School and then studied at the Royal Academy of Music with Melanie Ruth Daiken. She has written a wide range of pieces including opera, ballet, music theatre, choral works, chamber compositions and music for film and television, which are regularly performed all over the world.

Among her most widely performed works are Westminster Mass, commissioned for Westminster Cathedral Choir on the occasion of Cardinal Hume's 75th birthday in May 1998, The Music Programme, an opera for Polish National Opera's millennium season which received its UK premiere at the BOC Covent Garden Festival, and settings for solo voices and orchestra of Vikram Seth's Beastly Tales – the first of which was commissioned by the BBC for Patricia Rozario and City of London Sinfonia. All three Tales are available on disc.

Panufnik has a particular interest in world music; a recent culmination of this was Abraham, a violin concerto commissioned by Savannah Music Festival for Daniel Hope, incorporating Christian, Islamic and Jewish music. This was then converted into an overture, commissioned by the World Orchestra for Peace and premiered in Jerusalem under the baton of Valery Gergiev.

Recently premiered was her oratorio Dance of Life (in Latin and Estonian), incorporating her fourth mass setting, for multiple Tallinn choirs and the Tallinn Philharmonic Orchestra (commissioned to mark their tenure of European Capital of Culture 2011). Her Four World Seasons for violinist Tasmin Little was premiered with the London Mozart Players and broadcast live on BBC Radio 3 on 2 March 2012, as part of BBC Radio 3's Music Nation, celebrating the 2012 Olympics.

The Bristol-based Exultate Singers, under their founder-conductor David Ogden, gave the premiere of Panufnik's Magnificat and Nunc Dimittis for the London Festival of Contemporary Church Music in 2012. Of the Magnificat, Panufnik said:

"I consulted my good friend, the Rev. Canon Michael Hampel, and he suggested the idea of interpolating the Ave Maria with the Magnificat – as those words of the Archangel Gabriel telling Mary that she was carrying God's son must have been utmost in her mind for the Magnificat, which is her response to that awesome news – the words she says when she visits her cousin Elizabeth. Piecing the two texts together, they have very close associations – it seemed a very natural thing to do. The piece is dedicated to the two commissioning choirs, Exultate Singers and St Mark's Episcopal Church Choir in Philadelphia, with thanks for our very happy continuing collaborations."

Garsington Opera commissioned Panufnik's people's opera Silver Birch and gave the world premiere on 28 July 2017. With a libretto by writer Jessica Duchen this celebration of music, drama, poetry and dance brought together 180 performers on the stage and in the pit, from local schools and the community, working alongside professional soloists, Pinewood Group and the Garsington Opera Orchestra. Karen Gillingham, Creative Director of Garsington Opera's Learning & Participation Programme directed and Douglas Boyd, Garsington Opera's Artistic Director, conducted. Inspired by the timeless themes of war and relationships affected by it, the opera draws upon Siegfried Sassoon's poems and the testimony of a British soldier, who served recently in Iraq, to illustrate the human tragedies of conflicts past and present.

Panufnik was the inaugural Associate Composer with the London Mozart Players, 2012–2015. She is also a Vice-President of the Joyful Company of Singers.

In 2023, Panufnik was one of twelve composers asked to write a new piece for the coronation of Charles III and Camilla. Her setting of the Sanctus, Coronation Sanctus, was performed during the Eucharist.

In 2024, Panufnik received the Ivor Novello Award for Outstanding Works Collection at The Ivors Classical Awards. She was appointed Officer of the Order of the British Empire (OBE) in the 2026 Birthday Honours for services to music and to charity.

== Selected works ==
- Westminster Mass (1997), commissioned for Cardinal Basil Hume's 75th birthday, performed in May 1998 at Westminster Cathedral
- Powers & Dominions (2001), a concertino for harp and orchestra
- Inkle and Yarico (1996), a reconstruction of an anti-slavery play of the 18th century
- The Music Programme (1999), a chamber opera commissioned by Polish National Opera (based on a novel by Paul Micou)
- Beastly Tales (2001/2), for soprano and orchestra
- I Dream'd, one of nine choral pieces forming A Garland for Linda in memory of Linda McCartney
- The Upside Down Sailor, a collaboration with Richard Stilgoe
- Spirit Moves, a quintet for the Fine Arts Brass Ensemble
- Private Joe, a work for baritone Nigel Cliffe and the Schidlof String Quartet
- Odi et Amo, a ballet for London Musici and the Rambert Dance Company
- Olivia, a string quartet for the Maggini Quartet, with optional children's choir
- Love Abide (2006), a piece for choir, mezzo-soprano, organ, harp and strings commissioned by the Choral Arts Society of Philadelphia for its 25th anniversary
- Wild Ways (2008), a piece for choir, and shakuhachi commissioned by the Nonsuch Singers and Kiku Day
- So Strong Is His Love (2008) a piece for choir and quartet commissioned by the Waltham Singers for the 25th Anniversary of their conductor, Andrew Fardell
- All Shall Be Well (2009), an Advent carol commissioned by Exultate Singers for the 20th anniversary of the Fall of the Berlin Wall
- The Call (2010), an Advent carol commissioned by St John's College, Cambridge
- Magnificat (2012), a piece for choir commissioned by Exultate Singers
- Nunc Dimittis (2012), a piece for choir commissioned by Exultate Singers
- The Song of Names (2012), a piece for choir and chamber orchestra commissioned by The Portsmouth Grammar School for Remembrance Day
- Silver Birch (2017), a people's opera commissioned by Garsington Opera
- A Cradle Song (2017), a piece for choir and organ commissioned by the Royal Choral Society
- Faithful Journey, a Mass for Poland (2018, fp. Katowice, 9/11/18)
- Across the Line of Dreams (2019), a piece for double chorus and orchestra centered on Harriet Tubman and Rani Lakshmibai, commissioned by the Baltimore Symphony and the University of Maryland Concert Choir.
- Coronation Sanctus (2023), a piece for choir commission for the coronation of Charles III and Camilla
