= Howard Ionascu =

English choral conductor (born 1971)

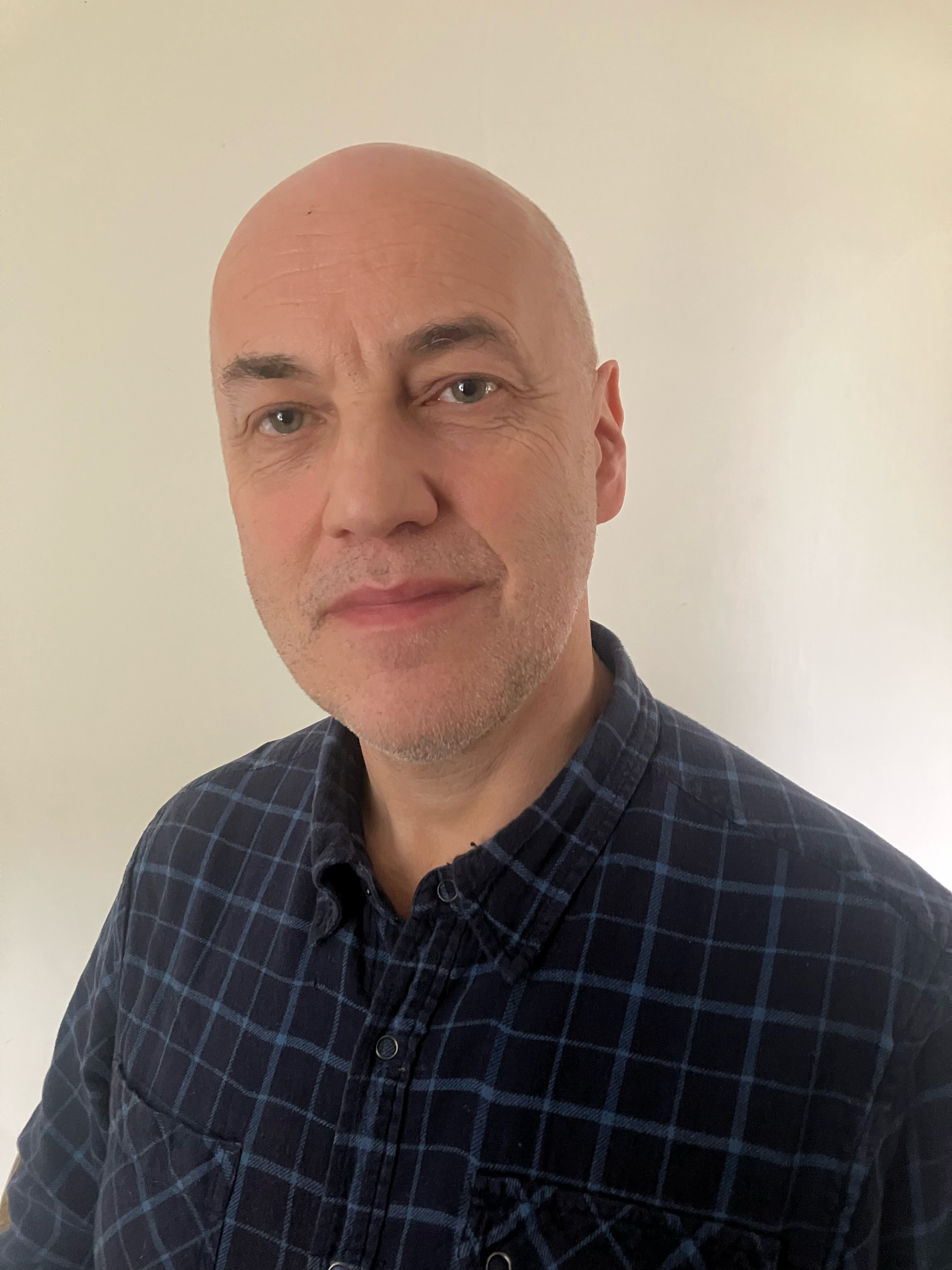
- Howard Ionascu at home, January 2025
- Born: 1971 (age 54–55); Newham, England
- Education: University of Manchester
- Occupations: Conductor and musical director
- Known for: Choral conducting
- Partner: Richard Hinzel

Howard Ionascu is an English choral conductor and musical director, with responsibility currently for the Laudate Choir, the Exeter Philharmonic Choir and Twickenham Choral.

== Early life and training ==
Howard John Paul Ionascu was born in 1971 in Newham, Essex, the son of Isidore Ionascu and Alma (née Gilbert). Ionascu was raised and educated in the East End of London, where he was inspired by music teachers to consider a future in music. In 1990, he attended the University of Manchester to study music, graduating in 1993.

== Career ==
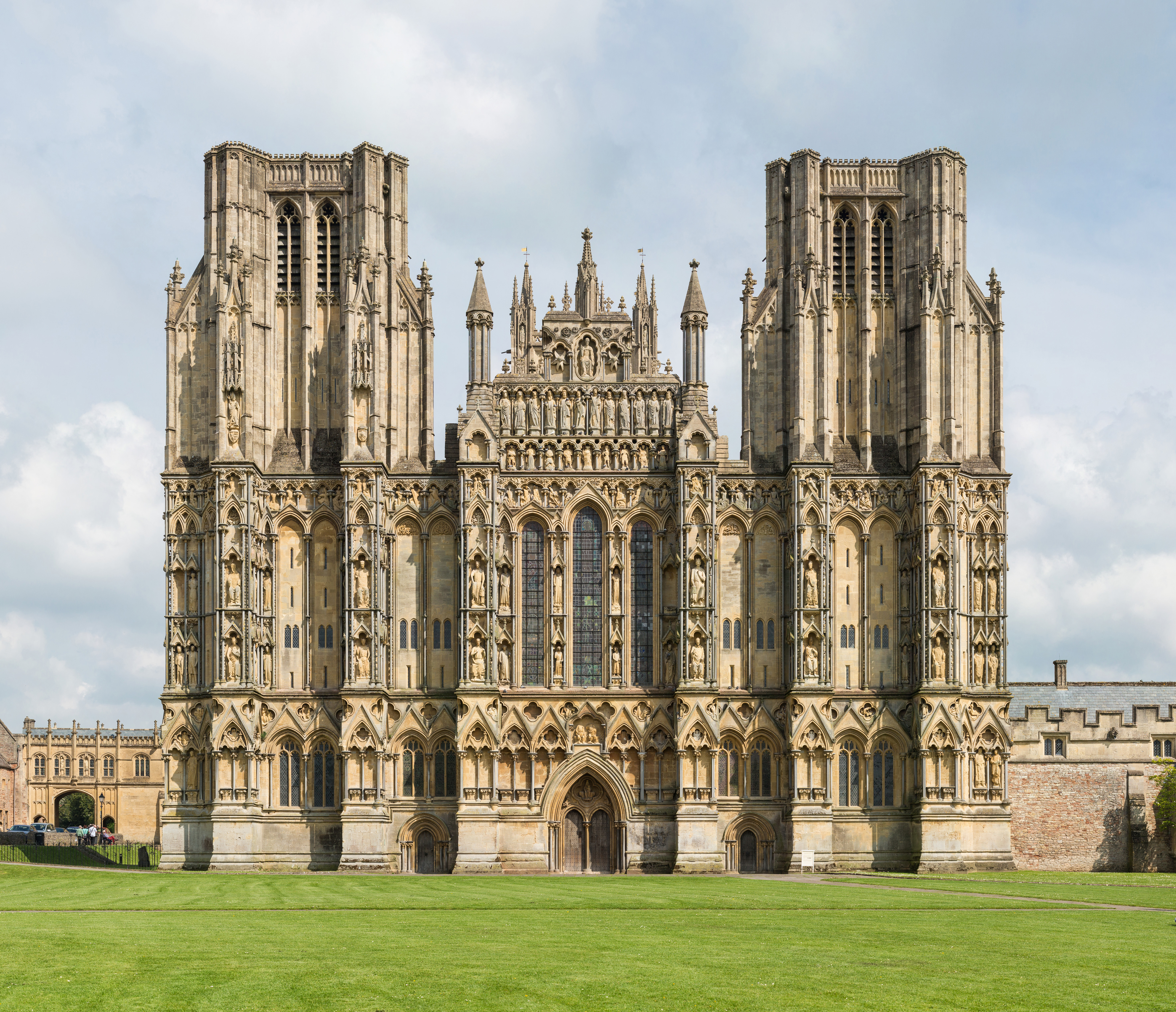
Daily services at Wells Cathedral

Ionascu's musical career began shortly after graduating from Manchester in 1993, when he was appointed Vicar Choral at Wells Cathedral Choir, a professional singer performing on a number of broadcasts, recordings and international tours. Not long after, he launched his teaching career, initially teaching flute and piano for Somerset County Council before acquiring a music Postgraduate Certificate in Education (PGCE) from Bath Spa University in 1997.

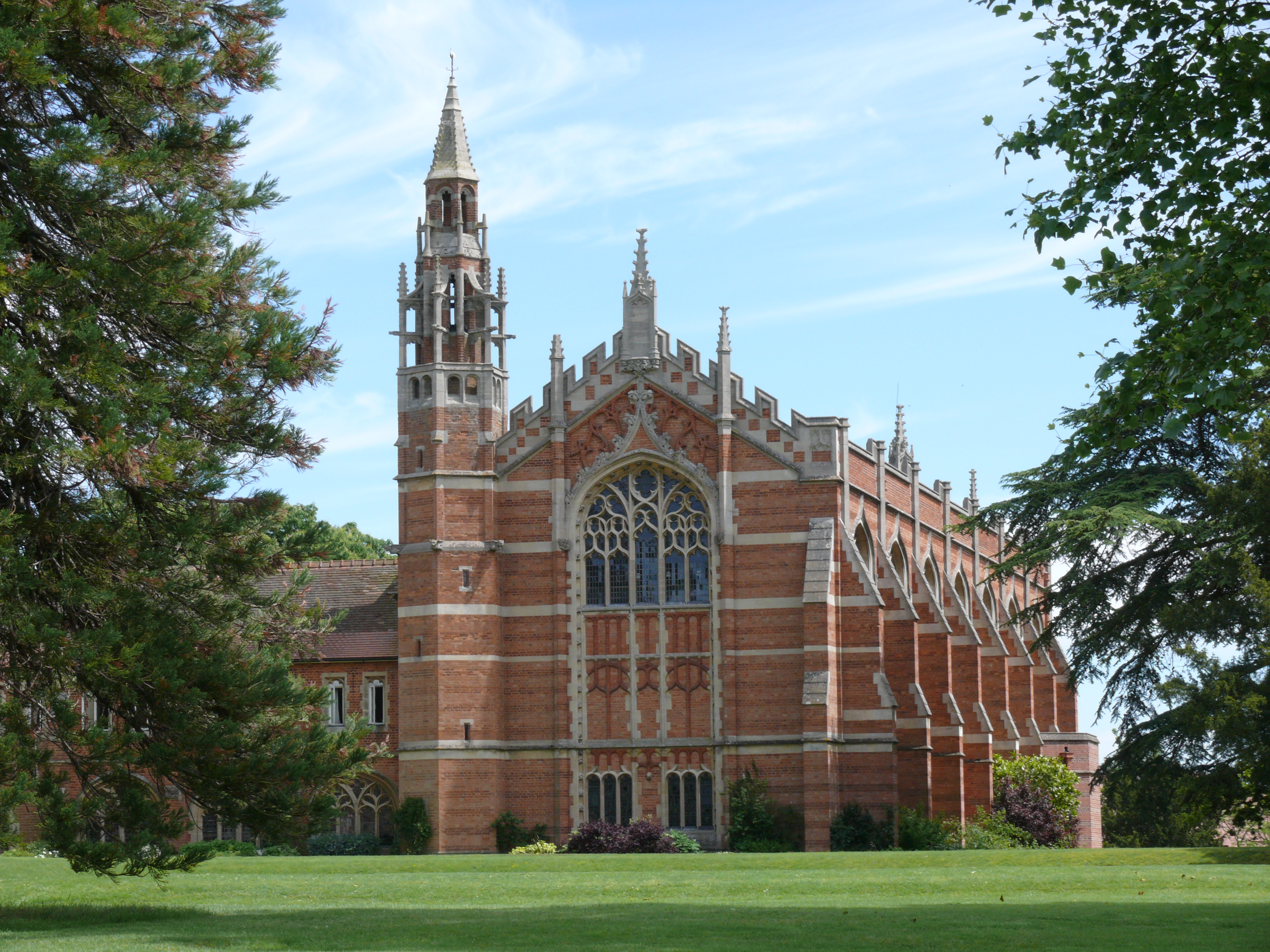
Radley College Chapel

On completion of his PGCE, Ionascu moved to Oxford, where he became Head of Academic Music at Radley College in 1997, launching his choral conducting career by founding (and conducting) The Laudate Choir, with whom he made a number of recordings over the next few years, performing with the English Chamber Orchestra and the City of London Sinfonia. Fellow teacher at Radley, Andrew Kennedy, recalled how in 1999, Ionascu combined the school choir (Radley College Chapel Choir) with professional (Laudate) in a memorable Christmas performance at Christ Church Oxford. At the same time, Ionascu became musical director for the Bournemouth Sinfonietta Choir. Over the next few years, Ionascu balanced teaching with musical direction through a series of musical schools, whilst conducting choirs from Oxford to Bournemouth and continuing to work with his increasingly acclaimed Laudate Choir. (Note: the Laudate Choir recorded three collections for Meridian in 1999, 2001 and 2002 and continues performing today under Ionascu's direction)

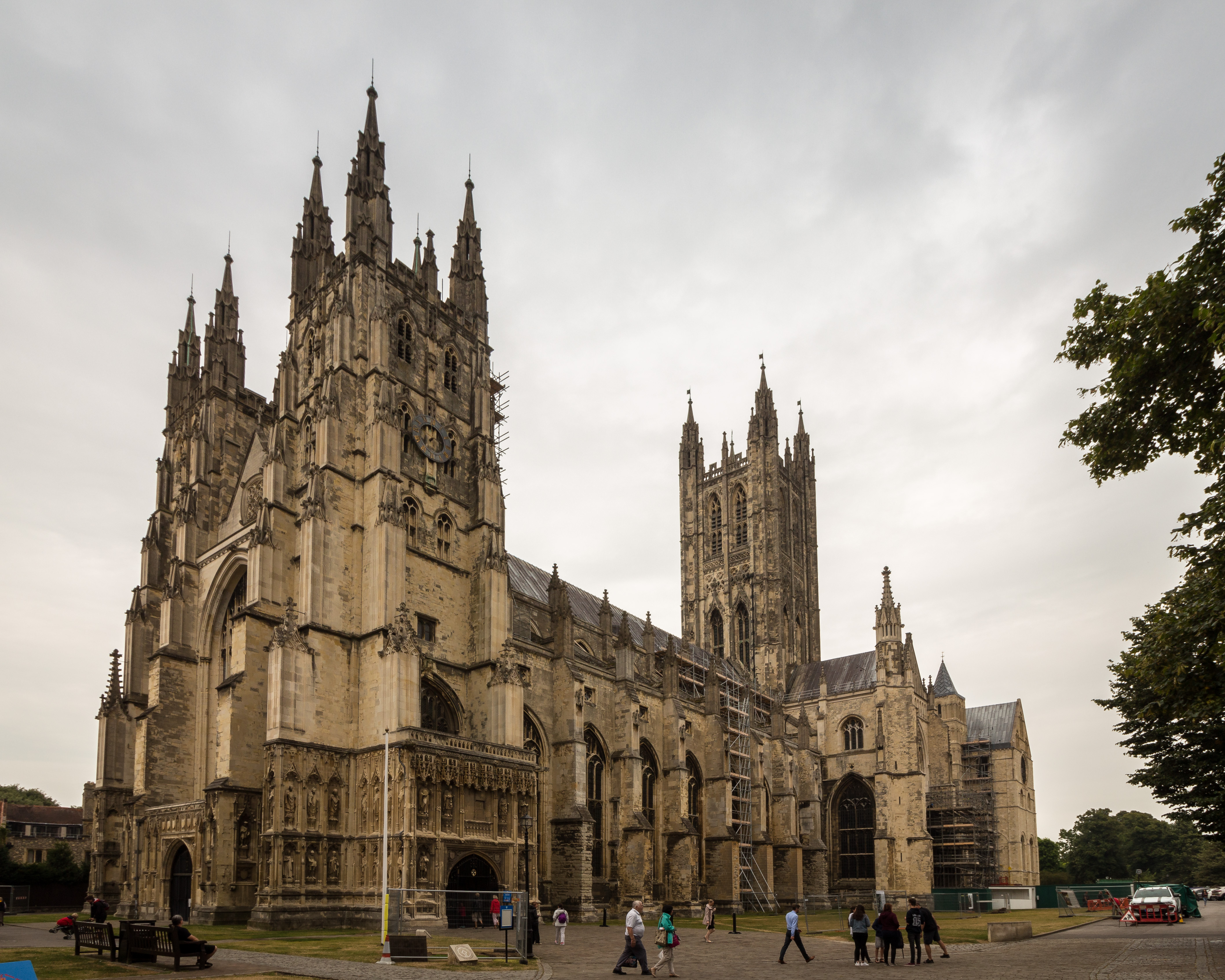
Canterbury Cathedral

In 2002, Ionascu moved to Canterbury, where he remained for the next eleven years as musical director of The King's School, Canterbury, conducting the Crypt Choir in weekly services at Canterbury Cathedral as well as performing a number of BBC Radio 3 and BBC Radio 4 broadcasts, recording three albums, touring the US, Africa, Australia and New Zealand between 2003 and 2012. In 2006 Ionascu was appointed musical director of King's Choral Society, whilst continuing to direct the crypt choir, performing large scale choral works at Canterbury Cathedral with upwards of 180 voices. The following year, Ionascu undertook a six-month conducting fellowship in Australia, seconded to the Cathedral Choir of St. Andrew's school in Sydney, leading workshops and masterclasses across New South Wales. (Note: conducting the Australian Boys Choir, and working with Wellington Cathedral Choir in New Zealand) In 2012, he conducted the Crypt Choir with the English Chamber Orchestra to accompany the Tenor Mark Padmore at Canterbury Cathedral. At the end of Ionascu's last year at Canterbury, the choir organised a surprise farewell concert, with speeches reflecting the school's appreciation for the work Howard had achieved over the eleven years of his tenure.

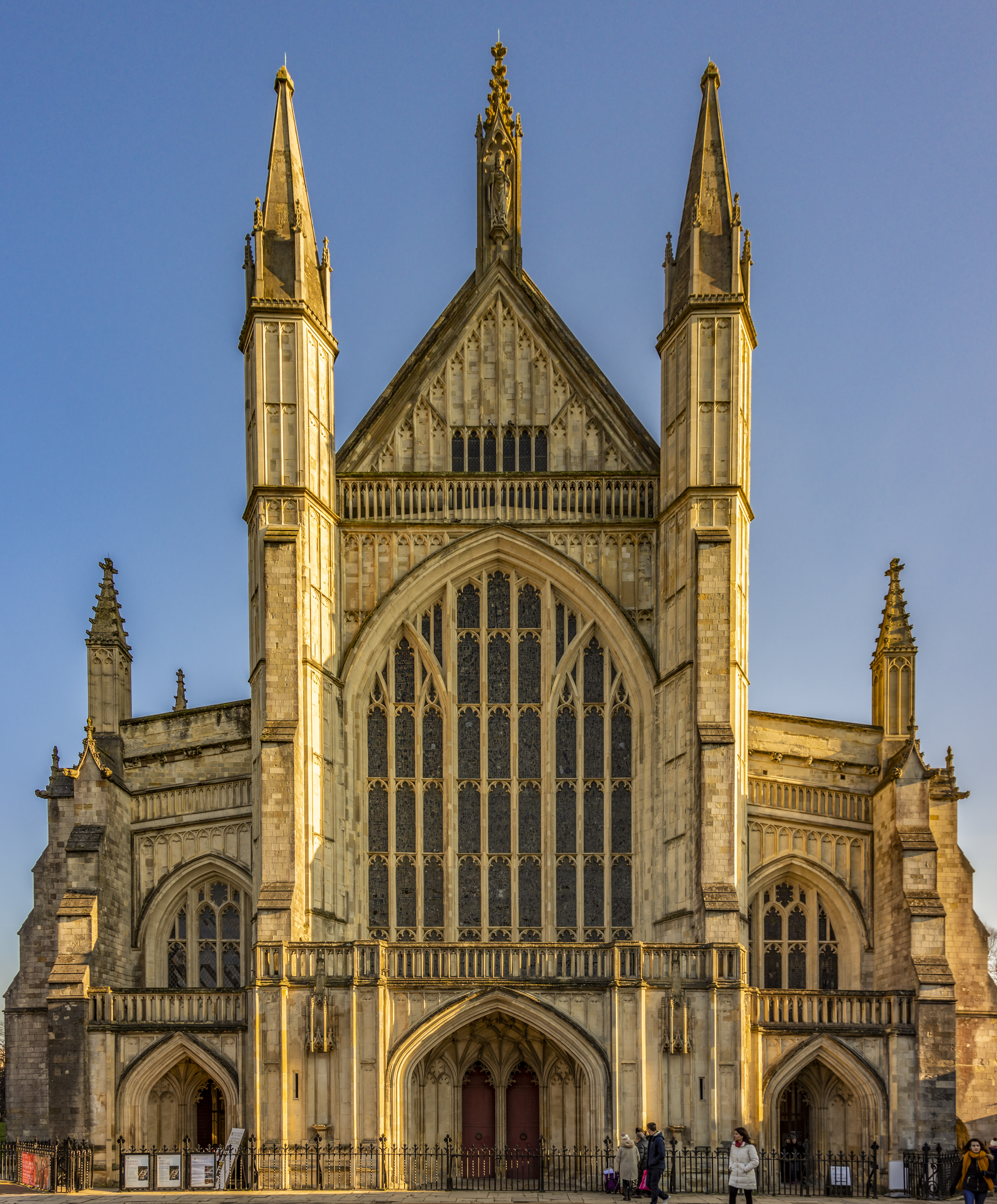
Winchester Cathedral

In 2013, Ionascu was appointed as director of the Junior Academy, a youth programme at the Royal Academy of Music in London, a position he held for the next five years and was made an associate of the Royal Academy of Music. Ionascu was appointed the director of music for the Exeter Philharmonic Choir in 2017, and in 2019, he was appointed director of Chapel Music and Quiristers at Winchester College. The new appointments allowed Ionascu to resume a busy schedule of tours, broadcasts and recordings as conductor and guest conductor for a number of choirs and orchestras from London and the South of England, (Note: Hyperion reports that "In recent years, Howard has also been Musical Director of Bournemouth Sinfonietta Choir, Finchley Children’s Music Group Trebles Choir and The Esterhazy Singers of London. Howard is also in constant demand as a guest conductor, including City of London Choir, Rodolfus Choir, Choir of the Old Royal Naval College, Greenwich, Orlando Chamber Choir, Guildford Choral Society and Eton Choral Courses. Howard has conducted a number of the leading UK orchestras and ensembles, including Bournemouth Symphony Orchestra, English Chamber Orchestra, City of London Sinfonia, New London Orchestra and Onyx Brass") continuing to direct and conduct his own Laudate Choir. In 2024, Ionascu relinquished his teaching position at Winchester and was appointed conductor and musical director at the Twickenham Choral Society.

== Discography ==
- Whisper it Easily, Laudate Choir, Meridian (1999)
- The True Vine, Laudate Choir, Meridian (2001)
- The Choral Music of Herbert Brewer, Laudate Choir,Trophy Records (2002)
- The Complete New English Hymnal - Volume Sixteen, The King's School Choir, Canterbury, Priory (2003)
- In Quires and Places, The Crypt Choir of King's School, Canterbury, Herald (2007)
- A Spotless Rose, The Crypt Choir of King's School, Canterbury, Herald (2009)
- A Winter's Night - Christmas Music For Choir, Brass Quintet & Organ, Winchester College Chapel Choir, Onyx Brass, Benjamin Cunningham, Signum Classics (2020)
- Lo, the full, final sacrifice, Winchester College Chapel Choir, London Mozart Players, members of SANSARA and The Laudate Choir Spotify (2024)
