= Stephen McWatters =

British schoolteacher and headmaster

Stephen John McWatters (24 April 1921 – 12 March 2006) was a British schoolteacher and headmaster.

McWatters was the son of Sir Arthur McWatters of the Indian Civil Service and spent much of his early childhood in India. He was later educated at the Dragon School and then Eton College where he was a scholar.

After Eton he attended Trinity College, Oxford where he took a first in Mods. After war service in the Royal Green Jackets, he came back to Oxford and took a first in Greats. In 1957, he married Mary Wilkinson and they had two daughters and a son.

== Teaching ==
After Oxford, he began teaching classics at Eton and he remained there until 1963, when he became headmaster at Clifton College; he remained at Clifton until 1975 when he became the head of the Pilgrims School, Winchester. He later, after formal retirement, also taught at Winchester College.
