= I will sing with the spirit =

- by John Rutter
- Text: 1 Corinthians 14:15
- Dedication: Royal School of Church Music
- Published: 1994
- Scoring: SATB choir and organ

"I will sing with the spirit" is a sacred choral composition by John Rutter. The biblical text is taken from 1 Corinthians 14:15, adding to the second half of the verse an often repeated "alleluia". Rutter scored the piece for four vocal parts (SATB) and organ, adding other versions. He composed it in 1994 for the Royal School of Church Music in England.

The work was published by Oxford University Press in 1994. Marked "Brightly and serenely", the music is in A major and common time, and takes about three minutes to perform. Rutter also wrote a version for two upper voices and piano, and orchestral accompaniment for both versions. It is included in the collection John Rutter Anthems.

It was recorded several times, for example ending a collection of Rutter's choral works performed under his direction by the Cambridge Singers and the City of London Sinfonia, featuring his Mass of the Children. It is part of the 2008 Anniversary Collection of the Mormon Tabernacle Choir.

== Text and music ==
The text, with its juxtaposition of "spirit" and "understanding", interpreted also as "heart" and "mind", has been used by church musicians to reflect the synthesis of the two elements needed in good church music. Rutter chose the text, "mingling the heart and mind of worship music", well for a school of church music. In the four-part version, the soprano alone presents the first part of the text. "I will sing" leaps up a sixth to a long note on "sing", in a first repeat even up an octave, followed by a sequence of "alleluia". In a third repeat, all voices sing the first version in unison, then they perform in homophony the second version and the alleluia. In a middle section, the second part of the biblical text is sung three times, marked three times dolce e legato. The soprano, the alto, finally the men sing "with understanding also", culminating in a four-part lively alleluia. In a reprise section, the first line is repeated by all voices, with imitation of motifs. A coda repeats alleluia two more times, rallentando to Lento, and gradually softened to pp, ending on a soft six-part long note.
