= The Pilgrims' School =

The Pilgrim's School
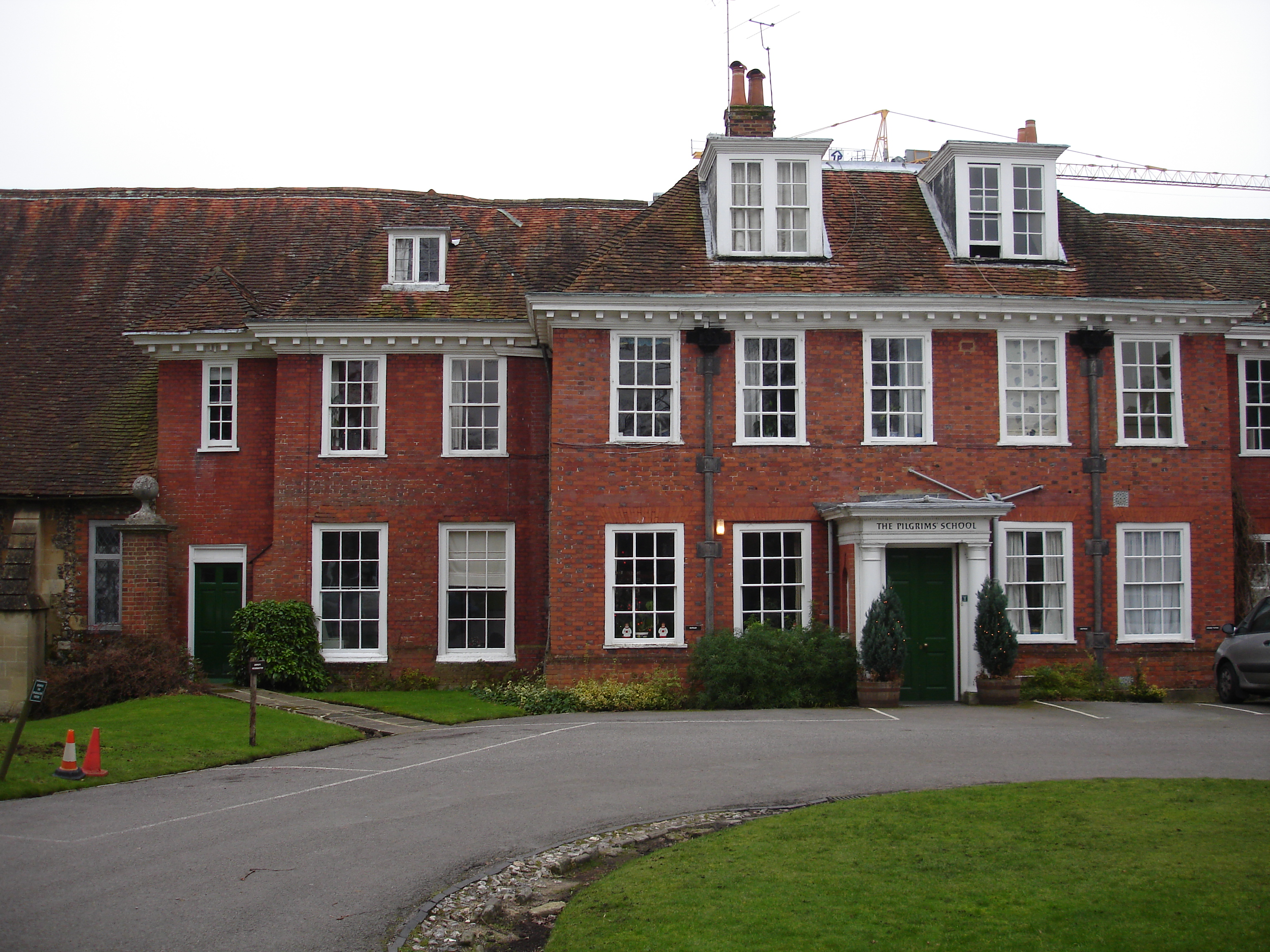
- School badge The Pilgrims' School building, 2007

Location
- 3 The Close; Winchester, Hampshire, SO23 9LT; England; 51°03′32″N 1°18′47″W

Information
- Type: 4–13 boys Independent preparatory day and boarding Choral foundation school Cathedral school
- Motto: To be a Pilgrim
- Religious affiliation: Church of England
- Established: 1931
- Founder: Humphrey Salwey, Dean Gordon Selwyn
- Local authority: Hampshire
- Chair of Governors: Jeremy Griffith
- Head: Tim Butcher
- Gender: Boys
- Age: 4 to 13
- Enrolment: 269
- Capacity: 280
- Houses: Monks, Normans, Romans, Saxons, Wrens
- Alumni: Old Pilgrims
- Choirs: Winchester Cathedral Choir Winchester College Chapel Choir
- Website: The Pilgrims School

The Pilgrims' School is a preparatory school and cathedral school for boys aged 4–13, in the cathedral city Winchester, Hampshire, England.

The official date of establishment for the cathedral school is unknown but historical records indicate choristers of Winchester Cathedral's renowned choir have been educated in the Close as early as the 7th century. The current school was opened in 1931. It also educates choristers of the Winchester College Chapel Choir, and since the 1st September 2025 has become part of Winchester College.

== History ==
The Pilgrims' School can be traced back through the schools associating with the Cathedral Choir to the Alta Schola which was established around 676 AD. This association continues today. A number of schools set up to educate the choir boys of Winchester Cathedral are known to have existed since Saxon times. Some scholars link them with the Alta Schola (Latin; High School), established in Winchester around AD 676.

The school moved to its present site and became a full preparatory school in 1931. It was officially registered as opened on 1 January 1935. The main building, redesigned by Sir Christopher Wren in the 17th century, is on the site of a former Roman villa, and includes a medieval hall and barn.

A pre-preparatory department was opened in 2007 to meet the growing demand for an early years programme.

== Overview ==
=== Architecture ===
The school hall contains England's oldest surviving wood double hammer-beamed roof, which used to accommodate the pilgrims travelling to the cathedral. The ancient city wall runs around the boundary of the schools games pitches, situated next to the school. A tributary of the River Itchen flows through the grounds of the school, with the boys able to fish further downstream. Nature reserves in the water meadows have an abundance of wild flowers and birds, and an Iron Age fort comprising a maze at the top of St Catherine's Hill is within walking distance of the school grounds.

=== School Houses ===
Upon entry, each boy is allocated to one of the 5 houses, known as 'sets'. They compete in inter-set competitions and points are given for good conduct and academic performance, etc.

- Romans
- Saxons
- Normans
- Monks
- Wrens

=== Boarding houses ===
Most boys are day pupils but the boarding programme is open to all. Cathedral Choristers or Quiristers generally board full-time while others return home for the weekend.

==== Main School ====
There are eight dormitories, and the building mainly houses the Winchester Cathedral Choristers and the majority of 'Commoners' (other pupils).

==== Q School ====
Q School, short for 'Quiristers School', is the property of Winchester College, because the Quiristers sing in its Chapel Choir and used to be taught separately in this building when they were a full part of the Winchester College community. However, in the 1960s it became uneconomical for the college to organise a separate school and curriculum from the rest of the boys, who were from Years 9–13, and so from 1966 onwards The Pilgrims' School welcomed Quiristers to be educated with the 'Commoners'. They still, however, have 4 dormitories for the Quiristers and some Commoners. The Quiristers continue to sing and rehearse at Winchester College, but are educated at The Pilgrims' School; staff at Q School are now solely members of staff at The Pilgrims' School.

Q School is situated on Kingsgate Street in Winchester, close to the main school site.

=== Admissions ===
In February 2023, 240 boys were enrolled at the school, with 163 day pupils, 77 boarders, 7 in the Early Years Foundation Stage (EYFS), 85 in the Junior School and 148 in the Senior School. The schools main points for entry are currently Reception (for boys aged 4+), Years 3 and 4 (for boys aged 8+/9+). Boys sometimes join the school in other year groups, and at various times in the year, subject to places being available.

== Headmasters ==
| Years in appointment | Headmaster |
|---|---|
| 1931-1963 | Humphrey Salwey |
| 1963-1969 | Rodney Blake |
| 1969-1974 | Martin Briggs |
| 1975-1983 | Stephen McWatters |
| 1983-1997 | Michael Kefford |
| 1997-2011 | Brian Rees |
| 2011-2013 | Patrick Watson |
| 2014 | Jeremy Griffith |
| 2015-2020 | Tom Burden |
| 2020-2022 | Sarah Essex |
| 2022-2023 | Alistair Duncan (Interim) |
| 2023- | Tim Butcher |

== Notable alumni ==
- Stephen Barton, composer
- Jamie Byng, publisher
- John Clegg, actor
- Jack Dee, comedian
- Johnny Flynn, musician
- Patrick Gale, author
- Jules Knight, singer and actor
- Hugh Mitchell, actor
- Anthony Smith, sculptor
- Jon Snow, broadcaster

== See also ==
- List of the oldest schools in the United Kingdom
- List of the oldest schools in the world
