= Clive Osgood =

- Born: Portsmouth, United Kingdom
- Genres: Classical, Choral, Sacred
- Occupations: Composer, organist, accompanist, music educator
- Instruments: Organ, Piano
- Years active: 2000s–present
- Website: cliveosgood.com

Clive Osgood is a British classical composer, organist, accompanist, and music educator. He serves as Director of Music and organist at St Bartholomew's Parish Church in Haslemere and teaches A-level music at Reeds School in Cobham. Osgood's compositions have been featured in the Convivium Records catalogue.

== Early life and education ==
Osgood was born in Portsmouth, United Kingdom. He attended St John's College, Southsea. He earned a Bachelor of Arts degree in music from Bangor University, followed by a Master of Arts in musicology from Cardiff University. After completing teacher training in London, he served as an organ scholar at Salisbury Cathedral for a year. He obtained a second master's degree in composition from the University of Surrey.

== Career ==
Osgood's compositional output encompasses choral works, orchestral pieces, and chamber music. A significant proportion of his work comprises sacred choral music due to his long-standing engagement with liturgical traditions. His musical language is classically structured but incorporates modern harmonic idioms and rhythmic patterns drawn from jazz and Latin American music.

His stage works include A Midsummer Night's Dream (2017), a music drama for soloists, choir, and strings, and The Beggar's Opera (2019), scored for soloists, choir, strings, and harpsichord; both were premiered locally in Haslemere.

Osgood was the winner of the 2024 Bach Choir Carol Competition. His Stabat Mater was featured in Gramophone magazine in May 2025, and his English Folk Songs, Chamber Works, and Magnificat were reviewed in BBC Music Magazine. Both works received critical attention for their harmonic inventiveness and emotional depth. MusicWeb International described Osgood's Stabat Mater as pastoral and flowing, noting its discreet orchestration and lyrical qualities.

A track from Osgood's album Clive Osgood: Christmas Collection, performed by Polyphony, accompanied by the Britten Symphonia and conducted by Stephen Layton, was featured as Gramophone's 'Video of the Day' on 8 December 2025. On 15 January 2026, a track from Osgood's album Clive Osgood: English Folk Songs, sung by Polyphony, accompanied by Britten Symphonia and conducted by Stephen Layton, was highlighted on the BBC Radio 3 programme Essential Classics as the playlister track, which invites listener suggestions for similar music.

== Discography ==
=== Choral Works ===
- Sacred Choral Music – Excelsis; London Mozart Players; Robert Lewis (2019)
- Magnificat – Excelsis; Amy Carson; London Mozart Players; Robert Lewis (2024)
- Stabat Mater – The Choir of Royal Holloway; London Mozart Players; Jack Liebeck; Grace Davidson; Mark Wilde; Julian Empett; Rupert Gough (2025)
- English Folk Songs – Polyphony; Britten Sinfonia; Stephen Layton (2025)
- Christmas Collection - Polyphony; Britten Synfonia; Stephen Layton (2025)

=== Vocal Ensemble Works ===
- Three Shakespeare Songs – Sofia Vokalensemble; Bengt Ollen (2024)

=== Chamber Music ===
- Chamber Music – Tippett Quartet; Lisa Friend; Lynn Arnold (2024)

== Personal life ==
Osgood is married to Leanne and has two children. He resides in the vicinity of Haslemere, Surrey.
