= David Ogden (conductor) =

British conductor

David Ogden (born 1966 in Tring in Hertfordshire) is a conductor and composer, directing choirs, choral and church music workshops, courses and festivals in the UK and abroad.

== Conducting ==
Between 1991 and 2002, he was Director of Music at Clifton Cathedral, Bristol, and from 1995 to 2001 he was Regional Director of the Royal School of Church Music for the South West and Midlands.

He conducts Exultate Singers, City of Bristol Choir, Royal Mail Choir, is the Head of the Bristol Choral Centre and Director of Music at Westbury-on-Trym parish church in Bristol. He was conductor of the RSCM Millennium Youth Choir from 2005 to 2014.

For over 25 years he has worked with numerous professional and amateur groups in many fields of music making, including concerts, musical theatre and opera, community projects, primary and secondary level educational workshops, from small children’s groups to the City of Birmingham Symphony Orchestra.

In June 2015 he conducted a chorus of 130 singers from Bristol Youth Choir and City of Bristol Choir, members of the British Paraorchestra, South West OpenUp Orchestra, Elmfield School for the Deaf & Westbury-on-Trym CofE Academy Signing Buddies, Larkrise Special School and singer Victoria Oruwari in a performance at Bristol's Colston Hall as part of the first BBC Music Day.

In January 2024, he conducted the world premiere of Jonathan Dove's work Odyssey at Bristol Beacon, in a performance given by City of Bristol Choir, Bournemouth Symphony Orchestra, Bristol Youth Choir, Bristol Windrush Reggae Choir, soprano Francesca Chiejina and tenor Thando Mjandana. The libretto for the work is by Alasdair Middleton, and the producer was Roxana Haines.

Ogden has conducted choirs in the UK, the Philippines, Switzerland, the Czech Republic, Finland, Italy, Germany, France, Spain, South Korea, Thailand, Belgium, the Netherlands and Ghana.

== Television and Radio ==
David Ogden has conducted choirs on BBC Radios 1, 2, 3, 4, 5 and the World Service including several broadcasts of Choral Evensong on BBC Radio 3 with RSCM Millennium Youth Choir, from Gloucester Cathedral in 2014, St Mary Redcliffe Church in Bristol in 2013, Bridlington Priory in 2011, Arundel Cathedral in 2010, Dunblane Cathedral in 2007, Romsey Abbey in 2006, and Beverley Minster in 2005. He has also conducted several appearances on BBC Radio 4's Sunday Worship including services from Gloucester Cathedral in 2014, St Peter de Merton Church in Bedford in 2012

He has worked as conductor, arranger and music adviser on many editions of BBC TV's Songs of Praise, including a live television broadcast co-ordinating simultaneous performances in Ghana and the UK in 2001.

He was Religious Music Adviser for series 1 to 5 of the BBC's drama series, Call the Midwife.

David Ogden worked with the Royal Mail Choir in the BBC Two series The Choir: Sing While You Work. David conducted the choir for a charity single with X-Factor winner Joe McElderry in 2013 and on the 2013 Royal Mail Christmas TV advertisement. In 2014 the choir raised over £50,000 for Prostate Cancer UK.

On 5 June 2015 he conducted a chorus of 130 singers from Bristol Youth Choir and City of Bristol Choir, members of the British Paraorchestra, South West OpenUp Orchestra, Elmfield School for the Deaf & Westbury-on-Trym CofE Academy Signing Buddies, Larkrise Special School and singer Victoria Oruwari in a performance at Bristol's Colston Hall as part of the first BBC Music Day. The performance was broadcast on Afternoon on 3 on BBC Radio 3 and simultaneously on BBC local radio stations around the South West, was featured on BBC Points West, and there was a live link up with The One Show on BBC One in which David conducted 'Believe' by Lin Marsh

== Composing ==
David Ogden writes music for churches and schools. Many of his pieces have been performed on radio and television, including his best known pieces: Song of Ruth, White Light Eucharist and the anthem, Christ has no body now but yours.

In April 2008 his piece Love's redeeming work is done was sung by a 250-strong choir in the presence of Pope Benedict XVI and a congregation of 40,000 as part of a Papal Mass in the Washington Nationals Baseball Stadium.

== Awards ==
In 2006 he was appointed Associate of the Royal School of Church Music for his services to church music. In February 2015 the RSCM Council announced that it will award him its highest honour, Fellow of the Royal School of Church Music at ceremony in October 2015.

== Recordings and publications ==
Ogden's music is published by White Light Publishing and RSCM Music Direct.

His music has been recorded by many choirs, including Exultate Singers, City of Bristol Choir and the RSCM Millennium Youth Choir.
