= Millennium Youth Choir =

British choir

The Royal School of Church Music's Millennium Youth Choir is a British choir for singers between the ages of 16 and 23. It is the RSCM's leading national choir.

In 1999, George Carey, the Archbishop of Canterbury, suggested its formation and gave its first performance at the Millennium Dome in London.

The choir has approximately 40 auditioned members in each season. It meets 3 times a year for courses around the United Kingdom and abroad, singing in churches and cathedrals.

== Conductors ==
The choir has been led by several conductors associated with the RSCM:

- 1999-2001: Martin Neary
- 2002-2004: Gordon Stewart
- 2005-2014: David Ogden
- 2015-: Adrian Lucas

== Recordings, concerts and broadcasts ==
The choir has made numerous broadcasts for the BBC on Radio 2, Radio 3, Radio 4, Radio Wales and BBC One on the Songs of Praise programme.

In September 2009, the choir made its BBC Proms debut joining members of other UK-based youth choirs to perform Handel's Messiah at the Royal Albert Hall with the Northern Sinfonia that Nicholas McGegan conducted.

In 2002 the choir recorded their first album, 'A Land of Pure Delight'. In 2007 the choir recorded another album as part of the RSCM's 80th-anniversary celebrations, entitled 'Out of the Stillness'.
