= Royal School of Church Music =

Christian music education organisation

- RSCM official logo

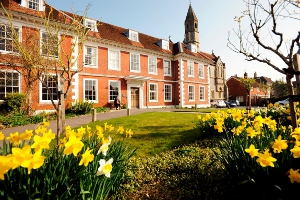
- The RSCM in Salisbury
- Abbreviation: RSCM
- Predecessor: School of English Church Music
- Formation: 1927
- Founder: Sir Sydney Nicholson
- Founded at: Westminster Abbey, London, UK
- Legal status: Charity
- Purpose: Music education; promotion of church music
- Headquarters: Salisbury, Wiltshire, UK
- Coordinates: 51.0662697°N 1.7970334°W
- Region served: Worldwide
- Products: Sheet music; RSCM Press educational books
- Services: Training programmes, music printing press
- Director: Hugh Morris (2018-)
- Website: www.rscm.org.uk

The Royal School of Church Music (RSCM) is a Christian music education organisation dedicated to the promotion of music in Christian worship, in particular the repertoire and traditions of church music, largely through publications, training courses and an award scheme. The organisation was founded in England in 1927 by Sir Sydney Nicholson and today it operates internationally, with 8,500 members in over 40 countries worldwide, and is the largest church music organisation in Britain. Its Patron as of May 2024 is King Charles III, following the previous monarch Queen Elizabeth II (who had held the position since 1947).

The RSCM was originally named the School of English Church Music and was only open to members of the Anglican Communion; today it is an interdenominational organisation, although it is still overseen by the Church of England.

Choirs affiliated with the Royal School of Church Music often wear the RSCM medallion, which features a picture of Saint Nicolas, its patron saint.

== History ==
The School of English Church Music (SECM) was founded in 1927 by Sir Sydney Nicholson, and opened at Buller's Wood in Chislehurst in 1929. In 1945, it became the Royal School of Church Music (RSCM), and moved to Canterbury Cathedral. In 1954, it moved to Addington Palace and then in 1996 to Cleveland Lodge, Dorking. Since 2006, it has been based at Sarum College in Salisbury.

== Activities ==
The RSCM seeks to engage and encourage church music through awards, exams, publishing, residential courses and professional advice.

Education programmes include the Voice for Life and Church Music Skills schemes, as well as the long-running residential courses.

The RSCM publishes church music and other materials for choirs and organists, and produces a magazine, Church Music Quarterly (CMQ), which alongside Sunday by Sunday provides information for church musicians.

The Millennium Youth Choir is the charity's national youth choir which has sung for BBC Radio 3 Choral Evensong and the Proms. The RSCM Voices and RSCM Cathedral Singers are other choirs run by the RSCM.

== Leadership ==
=== Directors of the RSCM ===
- 1927–1947 Sydney Nicholson (formerly Organist of Carlisle and Manchester Cathedrals, and Westminster Abbey)
- 1954–1972 Gerald H. Knight (formerly Assistant Organist of Truro Cathedral)
- 1972–1989 Lionel Dakers (formerly Organist of Exeter and Ripon Cathedrals)
- 1989–1998 Harry Bramma (formerly Assistant Organist of Worcester Cathedral and Organist of Southwark Cathedral)
- 1998–2007 John Harper
- 2007–2012 Lindsay Gray
- 2012–2018 Andrew Reid (formerly Master of the Music at Peterborough Cathedral; subsequently Director of Harrison and Harrison)
- 2018–present Hugh Morris (formerly Organist of Derby Cathedral)

=== Chairmen of the RSCM Council ===
The following have chaired the RSCM Council:

- 1996–2005 Sir David Harrison
- 2005–2010 Mark Stephen Williams
- 2010–2018 Brian Gill, Lord Gill
- 2018–2023 Reverend John Hall, Dean of Westminster
- 2023–2024 Phil Taylor
- 2024–present Sue Hayman, Baroness Hayman of Ullock

== Awards and medals ==
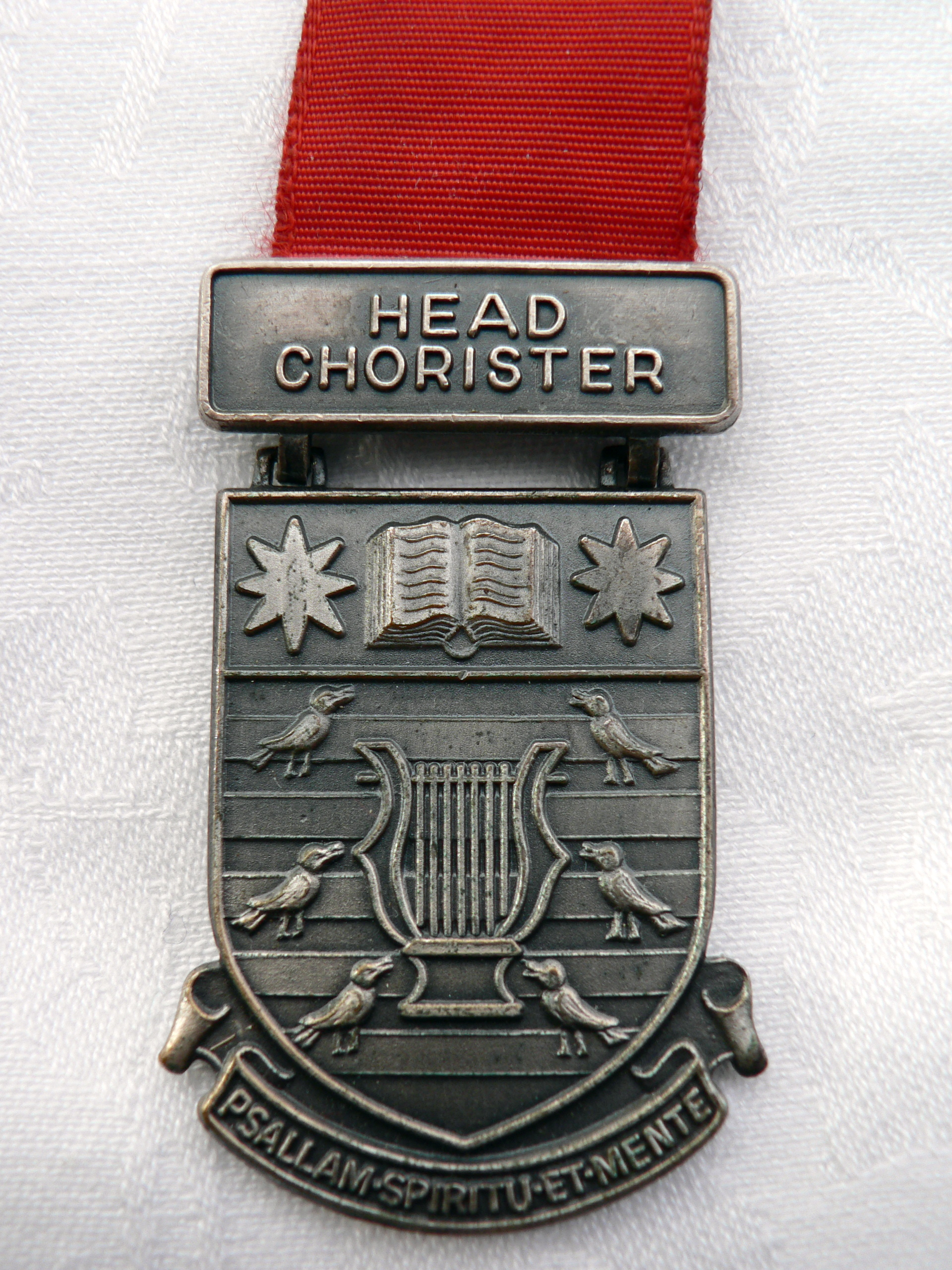
Head Chorister Medal

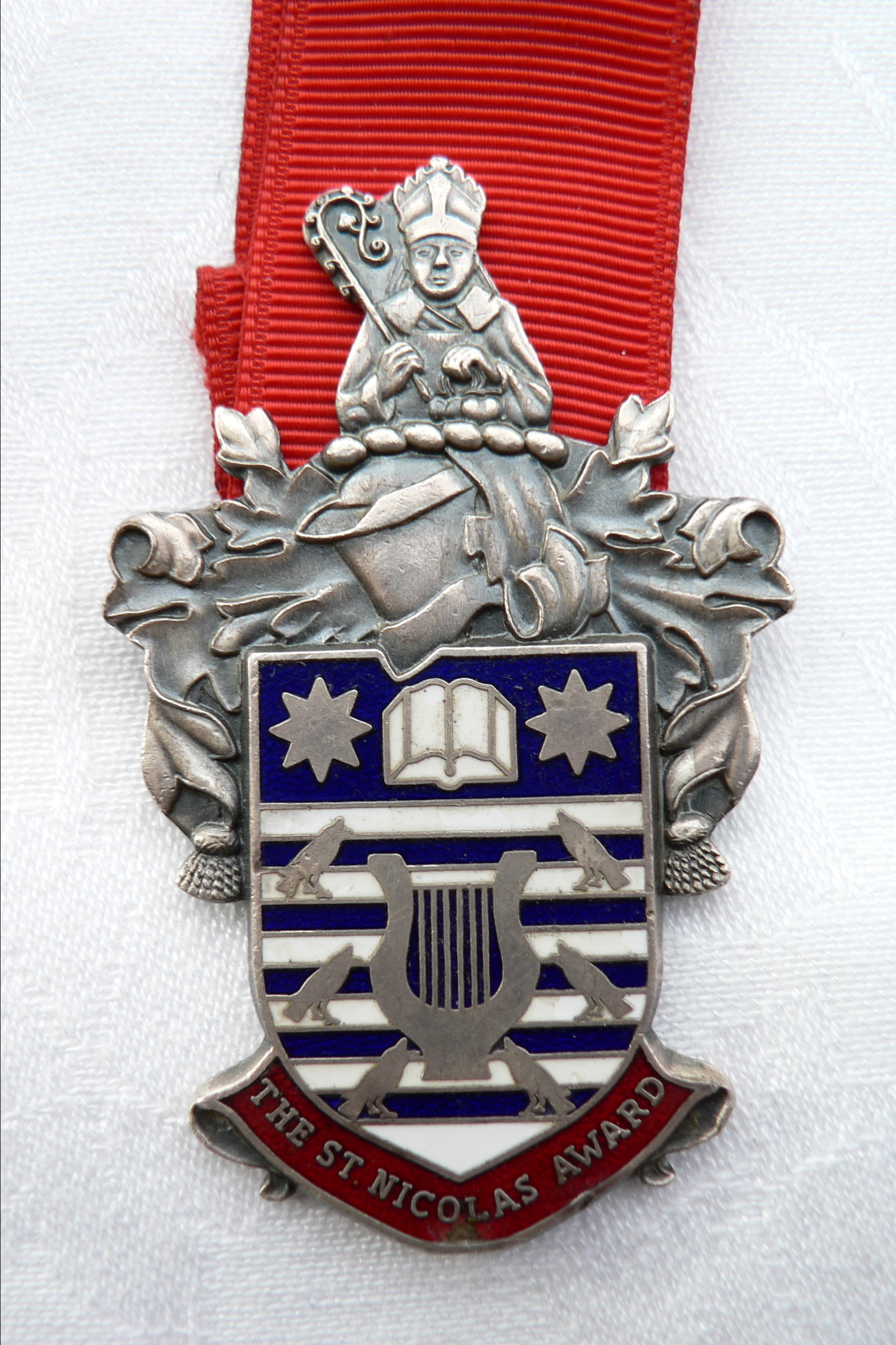
St Nicolas Award

The RSCM provides a series of grades and awards to signify varying levels of musical achievement. There are four basic merit awards – the light blue ribbon, the dark blue ribbon, the red ribbon and the yellow ribbon. These awards are used within a given choir to encourage individuals' progression and development, being managed and awarded at a parish/choir level. Beyond these are three awards (bronze, silver, and gold) achieved by examination. There are no prerequisites for taking the awards exams.

=== Honorary awards ===
Every year the RSCM Council confers Honorary Awards on those who have made outstanding contributions to church music. They are divided as follows:

- Fellow of the RSCM (FRSCM):
  - Awarded for achievements in church music and/or liturgy of international significance, or for exceptional musical and/or liturgical work within the RSCM.
- Associate of the RSCM (ARSCM):
  - Awarded for achievements in church music and/or liturgy of national significance, or for important musical and/or liturgical work within the RSCM.
- Honorary Member of the RSCM (HonRSCM):
  - Awarded for exceptional or very significant work that has contributed to the cause of church music and/or liturgy at international or national levels, or within the RSCM, but which is not primarily musical or liturgical.
- Certificate of Special Service (CERTSS):
  - Awarded for significant administrative work as a voluntary officer or member of staff within the RSCM; or an award for a significant contribution to church music and/or liturgy at a local level.

Coat of arms of Royal School of Church Music

Notes
Granted 12 October 1950
Crest
On a wreath of the colours a demi figure of St. Nicholas vested in pontificals Proper mitred and holding in his dexter hand a pastoral staff and in his sinister hand three purses Or.
Escutcheon
Argent five barrulets Azure over all a lyre between six nightingales three and three respectant in pale Or on a chief of the second an open book Proper between two stars of eight points of the third.

== See also ==
- Anglican church music
- Choirboy
- Christian music
- List of Anglican church composers
- List of musicians at English cathedrals
- Millennium Youth Choir
- I will sing with the spirit, anthem composed by John Rutter for the RSCM setting the text of their motto
