= Malcolm Archer =

British musician

- Born: 29 April 1952 (age 74)
- Education: Royal College of Music
- Occupations: English composer, conductor

Malcolm Archer FRCO (born 1952) is an English composer, conductor and organist. He was formerly Organist and Director of Music at Bristol Cathedral, at Wells Cathedral and at St Paul's Cathedral and Director of Chapel Music at Winchester College.

== Education and personal life ==
Malcolm Archer was educated at King Edward VII School, Lytham before studying at the Royal College of Music (as a Royal College of Organists scholar). He was later organ scholar at Jesus College, Cambridge. His organ teachers included Ralph Downes, Gillian Weir, and Nicolas Kynaston and he studied composition with Herbert Sumsion, Bernard Stevens and Alan Ridout.

Archer married Alison (an artist and musician) in 1994, and they have a son (b.1997) and a daughter (b.1999).

== Career ==
=== First posts ===
Malcolm Archer's first posts were at Norwich Cathedral as Assistant Organist (1978–1983), and Bristol Cathedral (1983–1990) as Organist and Master of the Choristers which he left to spend time living and working in the US.

=== Wells Cathedral (1996–2004) ===
Archer was appointed Organist and Master of the Choristers at Wells Cathedral in 1996 where he directed and trained the Cathedral choir for its daily services in the cathedral, as well as being the musical director for Wells Cathedral Oratorio Society. In April 2000, he and choir members participated in a tour to North America, which included concerts in Ottawa, Ontario; Albany, New York; Richmond, Virginia; Lancaster, Pennsylvania; Washington, DC; Lancaster, Ohio; Chicago, Illinois; St. Paul, Minnesota; Chattanooga, Tennessee and Augusta, Georgia. He has made several recordings with the choir, including with the labels Hyperion Records and Lammas Records.

=== St Paul's Cathedral (2004–2007) ===
Malcolm Archer took over as organist and Director of Music at St Paul's from John Scott in 2004. He directed the choir for several important state services, including the service to celebrate the 80th birthday of Elizabeth II, for which he composed a special anthem.

=== Winchester College (2007–2017) ===
In 2007 Archer was appointed as Director of Chapel Music and Organist at Winchester College, where he was in charge of the Winchester College Chapel Choir and the College Quiristers, as well as teaching composition and the organ. Recordings with the choir include Stanford's choral music, Britten's A Ceremony of Carols, Three Wings (Warner Classics) and Mozart's Requiem, accompanied by the London Mozart Players.

=== Compositions ===
Archer has had over 250 compositions published. His major works include ‘Requiem’, ‘Vespers’, ‘Three Psalms of David’, ‘The Coming of the Kingdom’, the musical, ‘Walter and the Pigeons’, the one-act opera, ‘George and the Dragon’, ‘Sinfonietta’ for orchestra, ‘Concerto for Trumpet and Strings’ and ‘Sonata for Cello and Piano’. His choral works include:

- A Hymn to the Virgin
- A Hymn to St Cecilia
- Alleluia, Who Is This Who Comes in Triumph?
- A New Commandment
- At the Round Earth's Imagined Corners
- Ave Verum Corpus
- Before the End of the Day
- Bless the Lord
- Blessed Are the Pure in Heart
- Bread of Heaven On thee We Feed
- Brightest and Best
- Christ Be Beside Me
- Christ Is Our Cornerstone
- Christ Who Knows
- Christ Whose Glory Fills the Skies
- Come My Way
- Creator of the Stars of Night
- Dance My Heart
- Exsultet
- Give Us the Wings
- God Be in My Head
- God Who Made the Earth
- Holy Is the True Light
- How Like an Angel
- Hymn to the Holy Spirit
- Jesu My Truth My Way
- Jubilate Deo
- Judge Eternal
- Lead Kindly Light
- Let All the World
- Light's Abode Celestial Salem
- Little Lamb Who Made thee
- Lord of All
- Lord of All Hopefulness
- Love Bade Me Welcome
- Love Is Not Feeling
- Love's Redeeming Work Is Done
- Missa Omnes Sancti
- O Breath of God
- O Clap Your Hands
- O Praise God in His Holiness
- O Sacrum Convivium
- O Salutaris
- Pie Jesu
- Praise to the Lord the Almighty
- Rejoice the Lord Is King
- Set Me as a Seal
- Sing Praise and Thanksgiving
- Sweet Music Sweeter Far
- Tantum Ergo
- The Lord's My Shepherd
- There Is No Rose
- Thou God of Truth
- When I Survey
- Who Is This Who Comes?
- Ye Choirs of New Jerusalem
- The Berkshire Service
- The Clifton Service
- The Wells Service
- The Chichester Service
- The St. Martin's Service
- The St. Mark's Service
- Missa Montis Regalis
- Missa Omnes Sancti
- Missa Brevis (a Capella)
- Benedicite
- Jubilate
- The Pembroke Te Deum

== Sexual abuse allegations ==
Archer was acquitted of indecent assault by a jury at Chelmsford Crown Court in 2019.

Preceded by Clifford Harker	Organist and Master of the Choristers of Bristol Cathedral; 1983–1990	Succeeded by Christopher Brayne
Preceded by Anthony Crossland	Organist and Master of the Choristers of Wells Cathedral; 1996–2004	Succeeded by Matthew Owens
Preceded by John Scott	Organist and Master of the Choristers of St Paul's Cathedral; 2004–2007	Succeeded by Andrew Carwood
