= Winchester College Chapel Choir =

Winchester College Chapel Choir is an historic British boys choir that sings in the Chapel of Winchester College. It contains 16 boys under age 13, known as quiristers, and older pupils from Winchester College. The choir has performed on the radio and has made multiple recordings. Members of the choir have won the BBC Young Chorister of the Year competition three times.

== History ==
Pupils at Winchester College include 16 Quiristers, 70 Scholars, and (fee-paying) Commoners.

When William of Wykeham founded Winchester College in 1382, he provided for 16 boys under age 13 to sing in the choir. These young boys are called Quiristers, or Qs. The Quiristers are educated at The Pilgrims' School, the school for Winchester Cathedral's choir. The Quiristers School used to be taught separately, but this became uneconomic, and in 1966 teaching was merged with that of the rest of The Pilgrim's School. In 2025, the Pilgrims' School was merged with Winchester College, becoming its preparatory school.

Winchester College has maintained the Quiristers since its foundation in the 14th century. Standards had fallen by the mid-19th century, at which time no training was provided to the Quiristers, who were picked not for musical skill but for "good behaviour and deserving conduct". In 1867, it was proposed to abolish the Quiristers in favour of a school choir, but nothing came of it. They were made to serve in the College dining hall, dressed in knee-breeches, Eton collars, Norfolk jackets, and aprons.

The Quiristers' status improved in the 20th century: from 1936, they no longer had to work as servants in the dining hall in College. From 1945 they began to be admitted to Winchester College as Commoners or (from 1948) as scholars in increasing numbers, to the extent that a former headmaster, James Sabben-Clare, could comment in 1981 that there was "a steady stream of talent into [Winchester College] from the Quiristers", and that it was "more normal than not" for Quiristers to move up into the school. As of 2026, Quiristers receive a 40% discount on The Pilgrims' School boarding fees; all get free tuition in musical instruments and voice training, and some receive additional bursary funding. The College states that most of them "will achieve a Winchester College music award."

The lower voice parts of Chapel Choir are sung by pupils of Winchester College.

The choir has performed Benjamin Britten's A Ceremony of Carols on BBC Radio 4, 'Choral Evensong' on BBC Radio 3 and Classic FM's annual Christmas concert.

Members of the choir have won the BBC Young Chorister of the Year competition three times.

== Recordings ==
- 2005 Fauré Requiem. HMV Classics.
- 2005 Christmas With Winchester College Chapel Choir. Naxos Classics.
- 2009 Stanford: Choral Music by Winchester College Chapel Choir. Convivium Records.
- 2009 My Beloved Spake: Favourite Anthems from Winchester College. Regent Records.
- 2011 The Winchester Tradition by Winchester College Chapel Choir. Regent Records.
- 2019 A Ceremony of Carols. Convivium Records.
- 2019 Mozart: Requiem. Convivium Records.
- 2020 A Winter's Night: Christmas Music For Choir, Brass Quintet & Organ. Signum Classics.

== Directors ==
The Director of Chapel Music at Winchester College is Dónal McCann. Previous directors include Howard Ionascu (2018–2024), David Hurley (2017–2018, and formerly a choral scholar), Malcolm Archer (2007–2017), Christopher Tolley (1992–2007), Julian Smith (1977–1992), and Raymond Humphrey (1970–1977, who served as cathedral organist for 75 years).

Cathedral musicians and composers have served as College Organists and Masters of Music over the centuries. These include Thomas Weelkes, Jeremiah Clarke, Samuel Sebastian Wesley and George Dyson.

== Sources ==
- Sabben-Clare, James (1981). Winchester College. Paul Cave Publications. ISBN 978-0-86146-023-6.
