= Community of the Holy Cross =

Holy Cross Anglican religious order, Costock, Nottinghamshire

The Community of the Holy Cross (CHC) is an Anglican religious order founded in 1857 by Elizabeth Neale (sister of John Mason Neale), at the invitation of Father Charles Fuge Lowder, to work with the poor around St Peter's London Docks in Wapping. The Community moved to a large convent in Haywards Heath.

The Community later felt drawn to follow the Rule of St Benedict, and moved their convent to Rempstone near Loughborough in 1979, where they lived the monastic life until 2011. The Community then moved a short distance to a new purpose-built convent at Highfields, Costock in Nottinghamshire.

The Community aims to achieve the Benedictine balance of prayer, study and work. All work, whether manual, artistic or intellectual, is done within the Enclosure. The daily celebrations of the Eucharist and the Divine Office are the centre and inspiration of all activity. Apart from worship, prayer and intercession, and the work of maintaining the house, garden and grounds, the Community's works are publications; providing retreats and quiet days; and dealing with a large postal apostolate.

== History ==
=== Elizabeth Neale ===
Neale was born at Gestingthorpe in Essex in 1822. Her parents were the clergyman Cornelius Neale and Susanna Neale, daughter of John Mason Good. She was the youngest of four children, the eldest of whom was John Mason Neale, priest and hymnographer.

After the death of her father in 1823, the family moved several times, eventually settling in Brighton. Elizabeth's home background was of a strict Calvinist regime but under the influence of her brother she adopted a Tractarian position. In 1857 Elizabeth responded to a call from Charles Fuge Lowder to establish a sisterhood to assist the clergy of St George in the East, Stepney. At that time she was running a small orphanage in Brighton and working in the parish of St Paul's Church, Brighton under the guidance of its priest, Arthur Wagner. Leaving the future of the orphanage in the hands of her brother and the Sisters of the Society of Saint Margaret, on 14 April 1857, Elizabeth, with a fourteen-year-old orphan set up house in Stepney. Later in the year three other women joined her and the bishop of London, Archibald Tait, gave her his blessing as Superior of the Community of the Holy Cross.

At first the sisters had a hard struggle to be accepted in the area but an orphanage and a House of Mercy were founded. When a new mission district was created in Wapping and St Peter's, London Docks was built in 1886 a cholera epidemic broke out. The sisters nursed the sick in their own homes, visited the hospitals and distributed food to those in need. The epidemic proved a breakthrough as the sisters won the confidence of the people.

As the Community grew additional works were begun. Mother Elizabeth's idea was that, as a mission, the sisterhood should break new ground, get the work established and then turn it over to local people. Mother Elizabeth relinquished her role as Superior in 1896 because of failing health and died five years later on 21 February 1901.

Mother Elizabeth put forward her ideas in 1887 when she published "Community of the Holy Cross: Short Account of its Rise and History". She is remembered as an early pioneer of religious orders for women in the Anglican tradition and for her formidable faith.

=== Haywards Heath and Rempstone ===
In 1886 land was bought at Haywards Heath, Sussex on which to build a permanent Convent. The first part was blessed by Father Richard Meux Benson SSJE in 1887. Another wing was added in 1889 and the convent chapel was built and dedicated on 14 July 1906.

In 1926 the full Latin, Benedictine Office was embraced. During the war the Convent was turned into a War Emergency Hospital and the sisters slept on bunks in the cellars. The day after the War Emergency Hospital closed the Community adopted the Rule of St Benedict in place of Mother Elizabeth's original rule.

In the following years the community changed from being an active to an enclosed community with no work being done outside the convent. At this time prayer and work for Christian Unity became important.

By the 1970s the Community was much reduced in numbers so in 1977 the decision was made to move to a smaller Convent.

In 1978 a house was bought in the village of Rempstone. Situated three miles north of Loughborough it was actually in Nottinghamshire in the diocese of Southwell. The move there was completed in September 1979. The community remained at Rempstone until the building of the new convent, a few miles away near the village of Costock.

== Community ==
Choir Nuns - 7

Sister Mary Luke (Mother Superior, elected 1991), Sister Mary Julian (Assistant Superior), Sister Mary Bernadette, Sister Mary Joseph, Sister Mary Cuthbert, Sr Mary Hannah, Sister Mary Catherine.

== Oblates and Associates ==
The Community has women and men Oblates who are attached to it in a union of mutual prayers. Each has a rule of life adapted to her particular circumstances. Oblates are not Religious but they seek to live their lives in the world according to the spirit of the Rule of St Benedict. Associates have a much simpler rule.

== Timetable ==
Matins - 6.15am; Lauds - 7.30am; Terce - 9.15am; Mass - 9.30am (subject to change); Sext - 12.15pm (subject to change); None - 1.30pm; Vespers - 4.30pm (4pm Thurs); Compline - 8pm.

Office Book: CHC Office

== CHC Reverend Mothers ==
1. Sr Elizabeth Neale (1857 - 1896)

2. Sr Anna (1896 - 1919)

3. Sr Lois (1919 - 1920)

4. Sr Mary Ida (1920 - 1923)

5. Sr Mary Mabel (1923 - 1931)

6. Sr Scholastica (1931 - 1947)

7. Sr Mary Anthony (1947 - 1962)

8. Sr Mary Margaret (1962 - 1970)

9. Sr Mary Benedict (1970 - 1974)

10. Sr Mary Laurence (1974 - 1978)

11. Sr Mary Katharine (1978 - 1991)

12. Sr Mary Luke (1991–2020)

13. Sr Mary Julian (2020-present)

== Design and setting convent at Costock ==
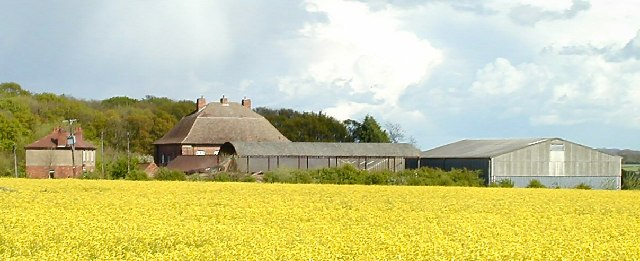
Highfields Farm, Costock, in 2005

The Convent is in the countryside but not too far from the village of Costock, a third of a mile off the main A60 road down its own track. The 26 acres of land is such that it can be managed simply in order to maintain and enhance the wildlife and biodiversity and to create the tranquility appropriate to the Sisters' way of life.

The Convent itself has been created with the three remaining farm buildings at its heart. It follows the traditional monastic pattern of a quadrangle around a cloister garth. This echoes the Benedictine abbeys and priories of the early monastic foundations in the more isolated areas of England. St Benedict's House, the old dower house of Bunny Hall and previously the farmhouse, is a building of great character and interest which has been fully restored to become the main focus of the Community's ministry of hospitality to those seeking spiritual refreshment.

The building has been designed to minimise running and maintenance costs, using suitable green energy systems and materials wherever possible, thus fulfilling the Benedictine ideal of care of all things. Also a new kitchen garden has been created containing raised beds for ease of use and there is also an existing 100-year-old Orchard and a small orchard in the garden of St Benedict's House.
