= Listed buildings in Carleton-in-Craven =

Carleton-in-Craven is a civil parish in the county of North Yorkshire, England. It contains 27 listed buildings that are recorded in the National Heritage List for England. Of these, one is listed at Grade II*, the middle of the three grades, and the others are at Grade II, the lowest grade. The parish contains the village of Carleton-in-Craven and the surrounding countryside. Most of the listed buildings are houses, cottages and associated structures, farmhouses and farm buildings. The other listed buildings include a church and an inscription on the churchyard wall, a public house, a group of former almshouses, a school converted into a village hall, a former cotton mill, a cross base, a milestone, and four parish boundary stones.

== Key ==
Grade	Criteria
II*	Particularly important buildings of more than special interest
II	Buildings of national importance and special interest

== Buildings ==
Name and location	Photograph	Date	Notes	Grade
Base of Carleton Cross; 53.92457°N 2.05792°W		Medieval (probable)	The remains of the cross are in stone, and consist of a square stone with a socket, about 60 centimetres (24 in) square, and a plinth of two large stones. The shaft is missing.	II
Inscription in churchyard wall 53.94423°N 2.04175°W	—	Early 16th century	In the wall to the east of the lychgate are two stones worked with raised Gothic lettering that is partly legible.	II
Carleton Biggin Farmhouse; 53.93417°N 2.03178°W	—	1571 or earlier	The farmhouse, which was extended in the 19th century, is in stone with a stone slate roof. There are two storeys and three bays, and the windows on the front are tall sashes. In the left gable end are three mullioned windows, and between the floors is a stone with initials and the date.	II
Southern Farm Building, Old Hall Farm; 53.94520°N 2.04469°W	—	Late 16th century (possible)	A house, at one time used as a farm building, in stone with a stone slate roof and two storeys. On the front is a former cart entry with a hood mould.	II
Glebe House; 53.94439°N 2.04504°W	—	17th century	A stone house with a stone slate roof and two storeys. Most of the windows are mullioned, some mullions are missing, and the ground floor windows have hood moulds.	II
Former barn, Trappes Hall; 53.94394°N 2.04497°W	—	17th century	The barn, later used for other purposes, is in stone with quoins and a roof partly in stone slate. There is a U-shaped plan, consisting of a threshing floor and gabled cross-wings. The doorways and cart entries have chamfered surrounds.	II
16 Beckside; 53.94436°N 2.04575°W		1672	The house is in stone with a stone slate roof, two storeys, two bays and a rear cross-wing. The doorway has a chamfered surround, a segmental head, and an initialled datestone. The windows are mullioned with five or six lights.	II
Higher Scarcliffe Farmhouse and barn 53.93896°N 2.07096°W		Late 17th century	A range consisting of a barn, a farmhouse and a cottage in stone with a stone slate roof and two storeys. The farmhouse has two bays, and contains two doorways with unmoulded jambs, and the windows are mullioned.	II
Lane Head Farmhouse and barn 53.93770°N 2.06342°W	—	Late 17th century (probable)	The farmhouse and attached barn are in stone with a stone slate roof and two storeys. The farmhouse has two bays, and on the front is a porch containing doorways with chamfered surrounds. The windows are mullioned.	II
Northern Farm Building, Old Hall Farm; 53.94539°N 2.04452°W		Late 17th century (probable)	A house, at one time used as a farm building, in stone with a stone slate roof and two storeys. On the front are three doorways with plain surrounds. To the extreme left is a round-headed doorway with chamfered surround, and there is a similar doorway in the upper floor of the right gable end. The windows are double-chamfered and mullioned with some mullions missing.	II
Robyns Hall; 53.94407°N 2.04595°W	—	Late 17th century (probable)	A stone house with quoins, a stone slate roof and two storeys. There are two doorways, one with a slightly arched lintel. The windows are double-chamfered and mullioned, in the ground floor with a hood mould.	II
Trappes Hall; 53.94372°N 2.04522°W		c. 1686	A house, later divided, in stone with a stone slate roof. There are two storeys and a large attic, and a nearly square plan. It contains two large mullioned and transomed windows, and smaller mullioned windows, and in the attics are large gabled dormers.	II*
Spence's Court; 53.94315°N 2.03917°W	—	1693	A group of almshouses with a chapel that has been altered. It is in stone and has a stone slate roof with coped gables and kneelers. There are two storeys and U-shaped plan around a courtyard. The courtyard is closed by wall with gate piers and wrought iron gates. The piers are panelled and have pulvinated friezes, moulded cornices and ball finials. Inside, there is a wooden gallery on octagonal wooden columns. In the ground floor are doorways with architraves, and the windows are a mix of sashes and casements.	II
Craven House; 53.94398°N 2.04528°W	—	1720s (probable)	The house is in stone with a stone slate roof. There are two storeys, a double depth plan, and two bays. The doorway on the extreme left has an architrave, above it is a dated panel, and the windows are mullioned. At the rear is a doorway with a slightly chamfered surround.	II
Porridge Stoup; 53.93200°N 2.07656°W		1730	A milestone at a crossroads, it consists of a squared stone pier. The date is inscribed on the top, and on each side is a pointing hand. On the sides are the distances to Keighley, Skipton, Settle and Colne.	II
Dale House; 53.94337°N 2.04586°W	—	Late 18th century (probable)	The house is in stone with stone gutter brackets and a stone slate roof. There are two storeys and a symmetrical front of three bays. The central doorway has fluted Ionic antae with foliated necks, and a frieze with a Greek key motif. The windows are sashes, the window above the doorway with an architrave, and the others with plain surrounds.	II
Grundy's Farmhouse; 53.94320°N 2.04190°W	—	Late 18th century	The farmhouse is in stone with a stone slate roof, two storeys and a cellar, and two bays. The doorway has a plain surround and a small pediment, above which is a roll as a frieze. The windows in the left bay are tripartite with mullions, and in the right bay they have a single light, and all have plain surrounds.	II
Boundary stone at SD 9593 5132; 53.95790°N 2.06354°W	—	18th or early 19th century	The parish boundary stone on the south side of Heslaker Lane is a round-headed stone slab set against a wall. It is inscribed with "Heslaker" in seriffed letters.	II
South View; 53.94341°N 2.04168°W	—	1815	A pair of stone cottages with a stone slate roof. There are two storeys, and each cottage has one bay. The doorways are paired in the centre, each with a pediment, the right pediment inscribed with the date. The windows are tripartite with mullions, the right cottage with sashes, and the left with modern windows.	II
The Rectory; 53.94267°N 2.03909°W	—	1821 (probable)	A house in stone on a plinth, with a sill band, an eaves cornice, a frieze, and a hopped slate roof. There are two storeys, a double-depth plan and five bays. The central doorway is blind, and there is a later doorway in the left return. Some of the windows are sashes and others are blind.	II
Boundary stone at NGR 9627 4776; 53.92601°N 2.05861°W		Early 19th century (probable)	The parish boundary stone consists of an upright triangular prism-shaped stone with a pyramidal cap. Initials are carved on the two front faces.	II
The Swan Inn and outbuilding 53.94347°N 2.04284°W		Early 19th century (probable)	The public house and attached outbuilding are in stone with a stone slate roof and two storeys. The front on Swan Street has six bays, and on Main Street are two bays. The main doorway has an ornamental fanlight, and other doorways have round heads. The windows are sashes, some tripartite. The outbuilding to the right contains a doorway, and a segmental-headed cart entrance with a re-set datestone above.	II
Boundary stone at NGR 9461 4889; 53.93546°N 2.08251°W	—	Early or mid-19th century	The parish boundary stone is a small squared stone inscribed with initials in fine seriffed capitals.	II
Boundary stone at NGR 9479 4864; 53.93403°N 2.08091°W	—	Early or mid-19th century	The parish boundary stone is a small squared stone inscribed with initials in fine seriffed capitals.	II
The Tithe Barn; 53.94383°N 2.04270°W	—	Mid-19th century (probable)	A school and master's house, later a village hall, it is in stone with a stone slate roof. It forms a single range under one roof, the school with a single storey, and the former house to the right with two storeys. On the front is a gabled porch, the windows are mullioned or mullioned and transomed, and all the openings have hood moulds.	II
St Mary's Church; 53.94446°N 2.04169°W		1859	The church, designed by F. H. Pownall, is in stone with a stone slate roof. It consists of a nave with a clerestory, north and south aisles, a south porch, a lower chancel, and a west tower. The tower has four stages, buttresses, a west doorway with a trefoil head, and a square stair turret, rising to an octagon, and with a pyramidal roof. The bell openings are paired, and above them is a parapet and a small pyramidal roof.	II
Carleton Mills; 53.94322°N 2.04399°W		1861	A cotton mill converted into flats, it is in stone with lintel bands, a dentilled cornice, a slate roof, and three storeys. The doorway is round-headed with a rusticated surround, and the windows have plain surrounds. At the east end is a tower with two cornices, pilaster strips and a parapet. The top storey contains elliptical-headed windows in architraves, and above is a truncated pyramidal roof with railings. At the west end is a tall octagonal chimney.	II
