= Trappes Hall =

House in Carleton-in-Craven, North Yorkshire, England

Coordinates: 53°56′37″N 2°02′43″W

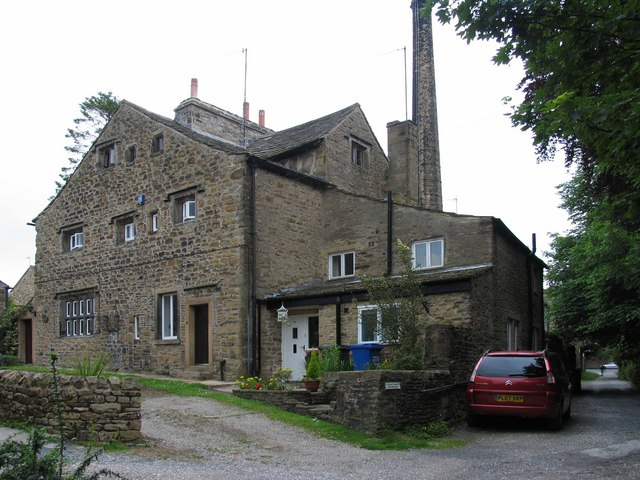
The house, in 2008

Trappes Hall is a historic building in Carleton-in-Craven, a village in North Yorkshire, in England.

The house was built in about 1686 by Christopher Trappes, when he married into a local family. It passed down the generations until one owner was involved in the Jacobite rebellions, forfeiting the property to the Crown. Its later history is unknown, but it was divided into two cottages, probably in the 19th century. It was Grade II* listed in 1954.

The house is built of stone, with a stone slate roof. It has two storeys and a large attic, and a nearly square plan. It contains two large mullioned and transomed windows, and smaller mullioned windows, and in the attics are large gabled dormers. It appears that there was originally a central doorway on the north side, but this was blocked when the house was divided, and there are now three 19th-century doors, one to the north and two to the south. There is a large, central chimney, with fireplaces in both the former main room and parlour.

== See also ==
- Grade II* listed buildings in North Yorkshire (district)
- Listed buildings in Carleton-in-Craven
