= Charles Lowder =

Church of England priest (1820–1880)

Charles Fuge Lowder SSC (22 June 1820 – 9 September 1880) was a priest of the Church of England. He was the founder of the Society of the Holy Cross, a society for Anglo-Catholic priests.

== Early life ==
Charles Lowder was born on 22 June 1820 at Lansdown Crescent, Bath, England, the eldest of two sons and four daughters of Charles Lowder, a banker, and his wife Susan Fuge. In 1835 he went to King's College School, London, before going to Exeter College, Oxford in February 1840. He received a Bachelor of Arts degree, a second in Greats in 1843 and a Master of Arts degree in 1845. While at Oxford he attended the University Church of St Mary the Virgin where he heard John Henry Newman preach. Under Newman's influence Lowder was drawn into the Oxford Movement and decided to enter the priesthood.

== Early parish ministry ==
Lowder was ordained deacon at Michaelmas 1843 and became a curate at Walton near Glastonbury. He was ordained priest in December 1844 by Bishop Denison of Salisbury and became chaplain of the Axbridge workhouse. From 1845 to 1851 he was curate of Tetbury, Gloucestershire. However, Lowder wished to move to a parish with a more Catholic pattern of worship and in 1851 he became assistant curate to James Skinner at St Barnabas' Church, Pimlico. St Barnabas', a chapel of ease to St Paul's Knightsbridge was at the time at the vanguard of the Ritualist movement. The church lay at the heart of an area of slums, having been built to serve the poor.

There was, however, controversy regarding St Barnabas' use of Catholic ritual. A Mr Westerton, an opponent of the high-church worship at St Barnabas', stood for the post of churchwarden in an attempt to bring them to a stop and hired a man to parade up and down the street wearing a sandwich-board canvassing for votes. In what he later called "a moment of madness" Lowder gave money to the choirboys to buy rotten eggs and encouraged them to pelt the board carrier. As a result, Lowder was called in front of a magistrate and fined. He was also reprimanded by his bishop and suspended from duty for six weeks.

Keeping a low profile, Lowder travelled to France and stayed at Yvetot seminary. While there he read the life of St Vincent de Paul. The example of Vincent and the Lazarists had a great influence on him and he was convinced of the need for a secular order of priests in the Church of England to provide mutual spiritual support to one another and to extend the Catholic faith, particularly among the poor.

== Society of the Holy Cross ==
On 28 February 1855 in the chapel of the House of Charity in Soho, Lowder and five other priests founded the Society of the Holy Cross (SSC) and Lowder became the first Master. The five other founder members were Charles Maurice Davies, David Nicols, Alfred Poole, Joseph Newton Smith and Henry Augustus Rawes (three of whom would later become Roman Catholics). Lowder took up the austerest form of the society's rule of life and so committed himself to celibacy. The society grew quickly drawing other Anglo-Catholic priests from some of the poorest slum areas in London. Before long the society was at the forefront of the Catholic revival. The society was particularly influential in the second phase of Anglo-Catholicism following John Henry Newman's reception into the Roman Catholic Church. Many of the great SSC heroes were at one time Lowder's curates, including Alexander Heriot Mackonochie and Lincoln Stanhope Wainright (both of whom were later vicars of St Peter's, London Docks).

== Wapping ==
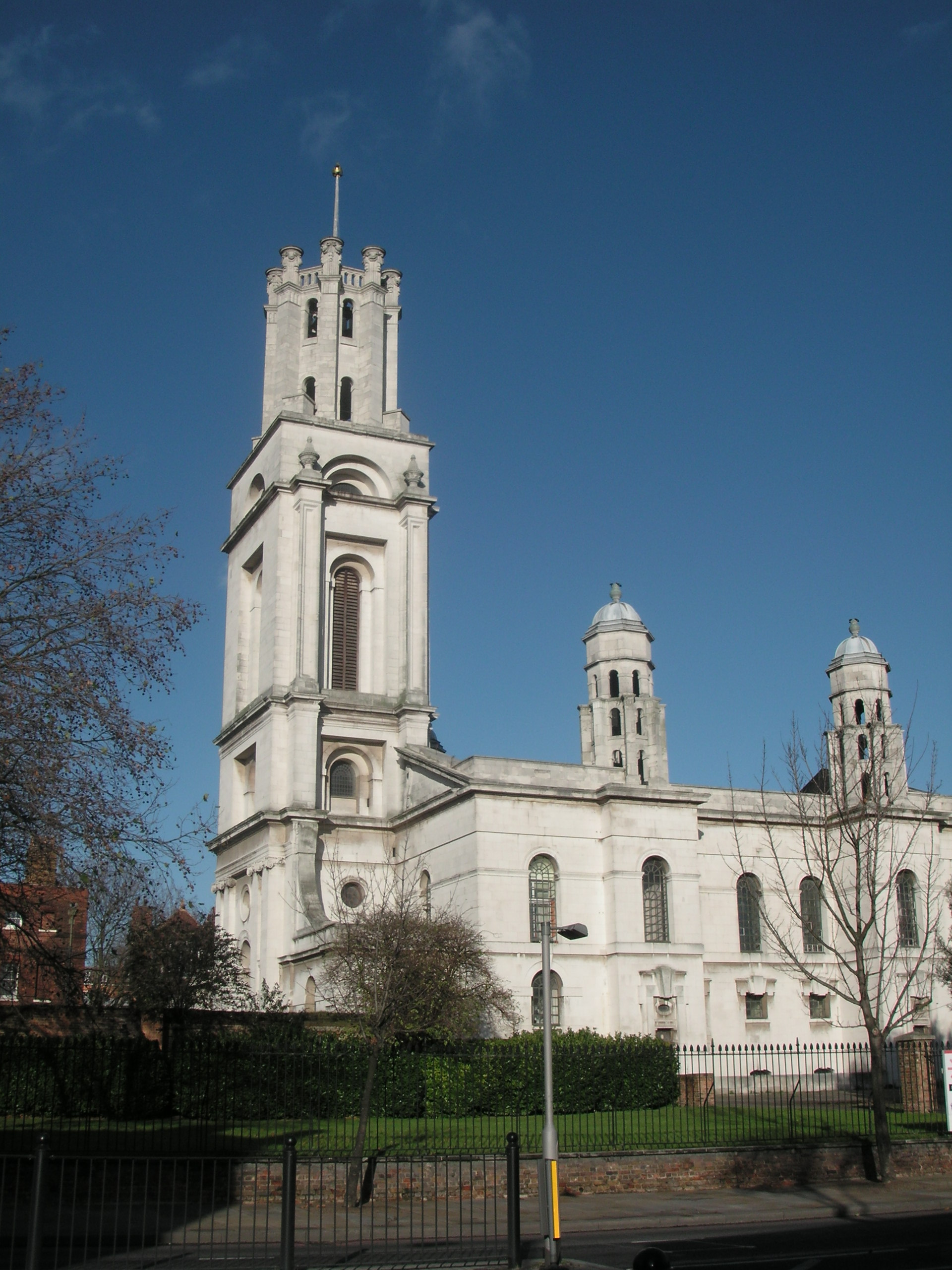
St George in the East

In August 1856 Lowder was invited by the rector to become head of the mission at St George's-in-the-East at the centre of the London Docks. The mission expanded quickly and later that year it opened an iron chapel (The Good Saviour) in Wapping and in 1857 began holding services in the rented Danish chapel of St Saviour and St Cross at Wellclose Square. In 1857 the mission was joined by Elizabeth Neale (sister of John Mason Neale) who founded the Community of the Holy Cross to assist in the mission's work.

The presence of the sisters of the community allowed Lowder to extend the mission's work providing schools, a refuge for prostitutes, a hostel for homeless girls, night classes and parish clubs, an insurance scheme for dockers, coal for the poor and general poor relief.

The mission was, however, controversial due to its high-church practices. Lowder, for example, wore eucharistic vestments (and was probably the first Anglican priest in London to do so). Riots took place outside the mission, stones were thrown and services were interrupted. Most of the trouble, however, focused on Lowder and the mission priests at the parish church and the chapels saw less trouble. Though he was often accused of "Romanism" Lowder was strongly loyal to the Church of England and was deeply upset by a number of his friends and curates becoming Roman Catholics (at one point all his curates left overnight, leaving him alone at the mission).

== St Peter's, London Docks ==
In 1860 Lowder acquired land for a church and began raising funds. St Peter's, London Docks was consecrated on 30 June 1866 and Lowder became perpetual curate (and on the retirement of the previous rector in 1873, vicar). The day after the consecration cholera was discovered in the parish. The conscientious work of the mission priests and sisters during the ensuing epidemic earned Lowder the love of his parishioners. From then on he was known to them as "the Father of Wapping", "the Father" or "Fr Lowder". Lowder thereby became the first Church of England priest to receive the title "Father".

Unlike many of his contemporaries, Lowder managed to avoid prosecution for ritualistic practices, largely on account of the respect for him among his parishioners and fellow clergy. An attempt in 1877–8 to prosecute him under the Public Worship Regulation Act was withdrawn by Archbishop Archibald Campbell Tait, who had helped draft the act, fearing that the prosecution would become a cause celèbre. The failure of the prosecution was a major victory for the Anglo-Catholic movement and contributed to the acceptance of advanced Catholic ritual in the Church of England.

In later years overwork and a peptic ulcer forced him to take time to rest outside the parish. The last service Lowder attended at St Peter's was on 1 August 1880 for a 'High Celebration' to mark the fourth anniversary of the Church of England Working Men's Society. After the service, at which Richard Enraght had preached, the clergy and congregation assembled outside the church where J. B. Spalding, president of the St Peter's CEWMS, presented Lowder with a silver badge of the society, "as a small proof of his many acts of kindness". A few weeks later Lowder died, probably of a perforated ulcer at Zell am See, Austria during a climbing holiday. A requiem mass was held at St Peter's and several hundred clergy and thousands of parishioners attended his burial at St Nicholas', Chislehurst.

== Legacy ==
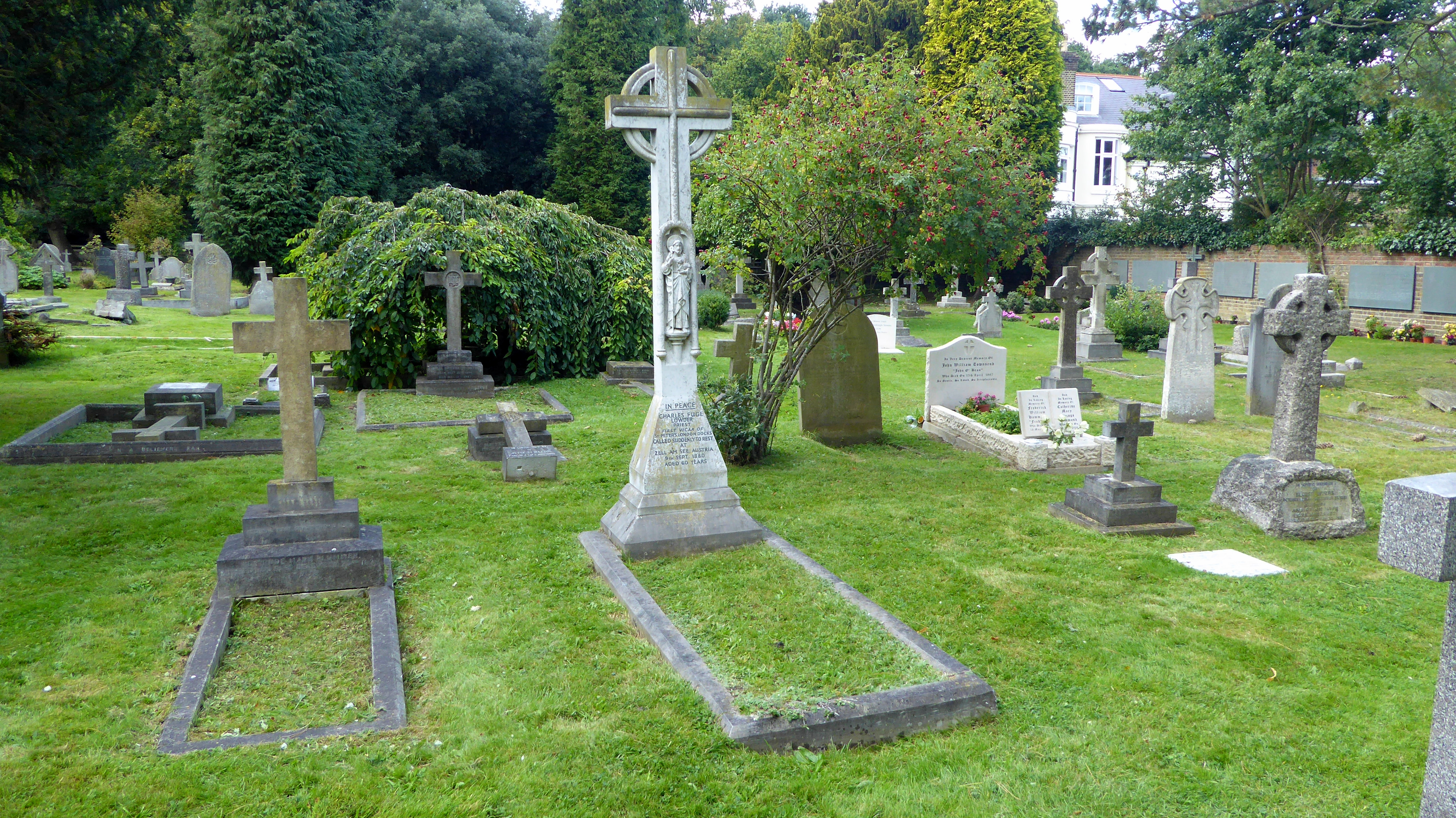
Grave of Lowder at St Nicholas' Church, Chislehurst.

Lowder wrote two books, Ten Years in St George's Mission (London, 1867) and Twenty-one Years in St George's Mission (1877), detailing his work at the mission.

Today, Lowder's influence lives on through the Society of the Holy Cross, St Peter's Church, St Peter's School and more generally through the Catholic tradition in the Church of England which he worked so hard to restore.

He also has a room named after him in the local primary school, St Peter's London Docks.

Charles Fuge Lowder is remembered in the Church of England with a commemoration on 9 September.

== Sources ==
- St Peter's London Docks – Fr Charles Lowder SSC
- Lida Ellsworth, 'Lowder, Charles Fuge (1820–1880)’, Oxford Dictionary of National Biography, Oxford University Press, 2004.
