= Edward Caswall =

British hymnwriter, Catholic priest (1814–1878)

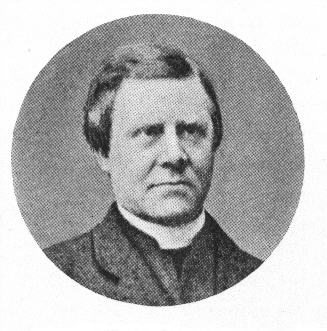
Edward Caswall

Edward Caswall, CO (15 July 1814 – 2 January 1878) was a British clergyman and hymn writer who converted to Catholicism and became an Oratorian priest. His more notable hymns include: "Alleluia! Alleluia! Let the Holy Anthem Rise", "Come, Holy Ghost" and "Ye Sons and Daughters of the Lord".

== Biography ==
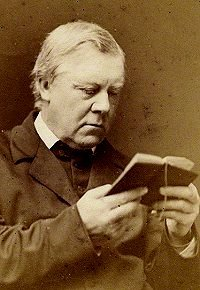
Caswall c.1860

He was born at Yateley, Hampshire on 15 July 1814, the son of Rev. R. C. Caswall, sometime Vicar of Yateley, Hampshire.

Caswall was educated at Chigwell School, Marlborough Grammar School and Brasenose College, Oxford, where he graduated Bachelor of Arts in 1836 with honours and later proceeded to Master of Arts. In 1838 he was ordained deacon, and in 1839 priest, in the Church of England. Before leaving Oxford, he published, under the pseudonym of Scriblerus Redivivus, The Art of Pluck, a satire on the ways of the careless college student.

He was curate of the Church of St Lawrence at Stratford-sub-Castle, near Salisbury from 1840 to 1847. As curate, he would invite the children who had attended morning services to the parsonage and give them breakfast. On the anniversary on one's baptism, he would give some money to buy clothes. In the summer of 1846 he, his wife, and his brother Tom visited Ireland.

He resigned his curacy and, in January 1847, was received into the Catholic Church by Cardinal Januarius Acton in Rome. His brother Tom had converted to Catholicism previously. Caswall's conversion caused an estrangement from some members of his family, including his mother and brother Alfred. His wife, Louisa Stuart Caswall, who had also become a Catholic, died of cholera on 14 September 1849 while they were staying at Torquay. The following year Caswall joined the Oratory of St. Philip Neri under future-cardinal John Henry Newman, to whose influence his conversion to Catholicism was due. He was ordained a Catholic priest in 1852. Caswall was delegated the responsibility of establishing the Oratory school, which opened in 1859. He often served as acting superior in Newman's absence.

His brother Henry was a priest in the United States and England, who is perhaps best known today for his encounter with Joseph Smith, the founder of Mormonism.

He died at the Birmingham Oratory, Edgbaston on 2 January 1878 and was buried at Rednal, near Bromsgrove, Worcestershire.

== Works ==
- A New Art Teaching How to be Plucked (1835)
- Morals from the Churchyard; in a Series of Cheerful Fables (1838)
- The Art of Pluck: Being a Treatise After the Fashion of Aristotle (1843)
- Sermons on the Seen and Unseen (1846)
- Lyra Catholica: Containing All the Hymns of the Roman Breviary and Missal (1851)
- The Masque of Mary and Other Poems (1858)
- Love for Holy Church (1862)
- A May Pageant and Other Poems (1865)
- The Catholic's Latin Instructor in the Principal Church Offices and Devotions (~1868)
- Hymns and Poems (1873)

== Hymns ==
He wrote original poems that have survived mainly in Catholic hymnals due to a clear adherence to Catholic doctrine. Caswall is best known for his translations from the Roman Breviary and other Latin sources, which are marked by faithfulness to the original. Most of the translations were done at the Oratory of St. Philip Neri at Edgbaston. They were published in Lyra Catholica, containing all the breviary and missal hymns (London, 1849); The Masque of Mary (1858); and A May Pageant and other poems (1865). Hymns and Poems (1873) are the three books combined, with many of the hymns rewritten or revised. Some of his translations are used in the Hymns Ancient and Modern.

According to hymnologist John Julian, Caswall's translations featured an especial purity of rhythm, which made his hymns easy to set to music and easy for congregations to sing. His widely used hymn texts and translations include "See, amid the Winter's Snow", "Alleluia! Alleluia! Let the Holy Anthem Rise"; "Glory be to Jesus", "Come, Holy Ghost"; "Earth Has Many A Noble City"; "Jesus, the Very Thought of Thee"; "O Blest Creator of the Light"; "When Morning Gilds the Skies"; "Sleep, Holy Babe" and "Ye Sons and Daughters of the Lord".

== Sources ==
- Julian, John (June 1907). A Dictionary of Hymnology. London: John Murray. pp. 214–215.
- Bailey, Albert Edward (1950). The Gospel in Hymns. New York: Charles Scribner's sons. pp. 198–199.
