= Cornelius Neale =

English clergyman

Cornelius Neale (12 August 1789 – February 1823, Chiswick) was an English clergyman.

== Life ==
Neale came from a London family with an Evangelical background: his father James Neale was one of the founders of the London Missionary Society. He entered St John's College, Cambridge and graduated Senior Wrangler in 1812, with first Smith's Prize and the second Chancellor's medal. He was elected a fellow of his college.

He was ordained and took a curacy in Leicester. He died of consumption in February 1823.

== Private life ==
In 1816 he married Susannah, daughter of John Mason Good: they had a son, John Mason Neale and a daughter Elizabeth Neale who founded an order of nuns.
