= St Mary's Church, Carleton-in-Craven =

Church building in Carleton-in-Craven, North Yorkshire, England

Coordinates: 53°56′40″N 2°02′30″W

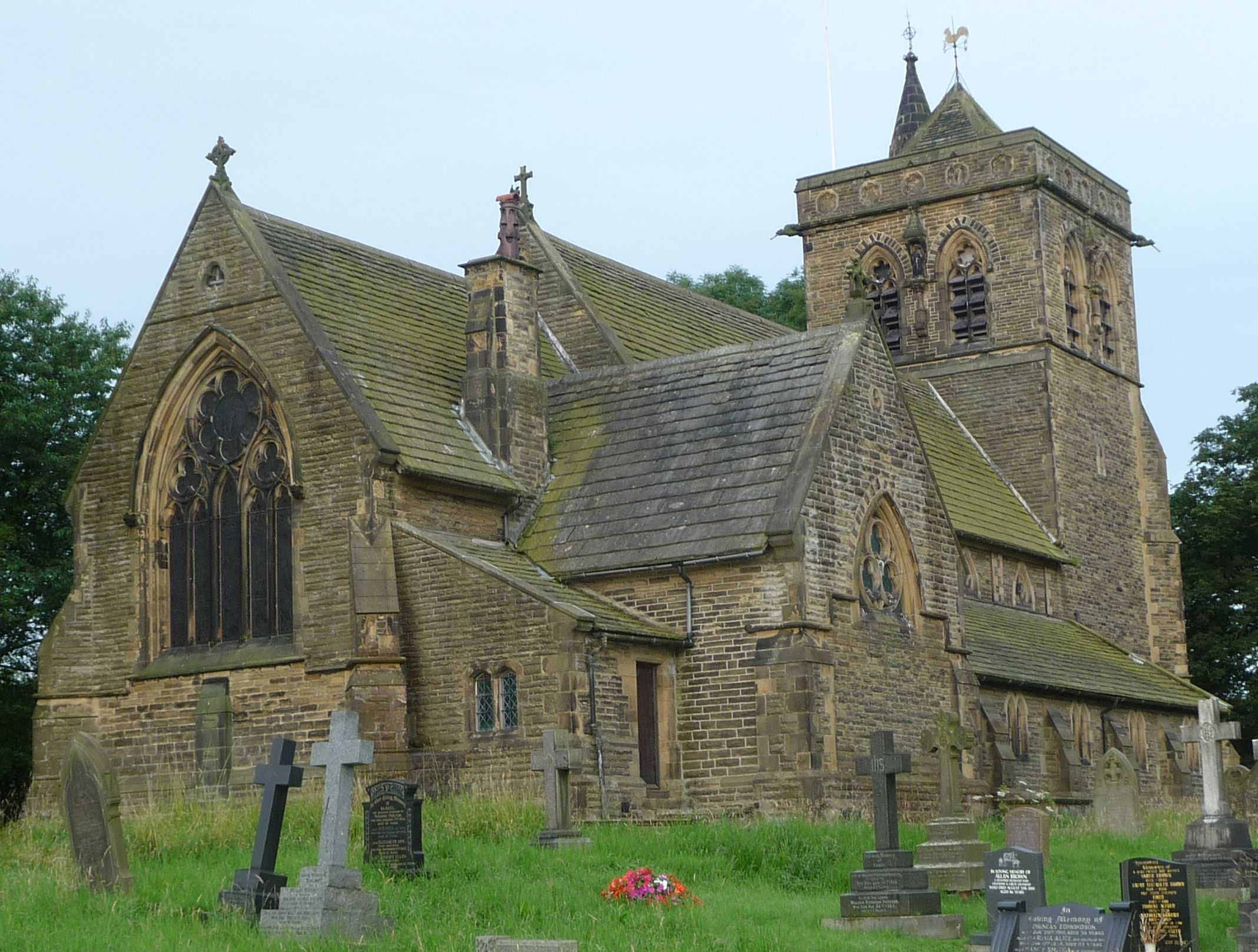
The church, in 2009

St Mary's Church is the parish church of Carleton-in-Craven, a village in North Yorkshire, in England.

There was a church in the village in the medieval period. It was rebuilt in the 16th century, the new building having a square tower, and capable of seating 250 worshippers. It was repaired in 1841, and a gallery was added. However, in 1859, it was demolished, and a new church was built, to a design by F. H. Pownall. It was Grade II listed in 1988.

The Gothic Revival church is built of stone, with a stone slate roof. It consists of a nave with a clerestory, north and south aisles, a south porch, a lower chancel, and a west tower. The tower has four stages, buttresses, a west doorway with a trefoil head, and a square stair turret, rising to an octagon. The bell openings are paired, and above them is a parapet and a small pyramidal roof. The interior is largely original. The east window, by Clayton and Bell, depicts a tree of Jesse. The font is Norman.

== See also ==
- Listed buildings in Carleton-in-Craven
