= Quicumque =

Quicumque may refer to:

- Quicumque Christum Quærtis is the opening line of the twelfth and last poem in the "Cathemerinon" of Prudentius.
- Quicumque Vult is a name given to the Athanasian Creed
