= Alexander Mackonochie =

Church of England mission priest

Alexander Mackonochie SSC
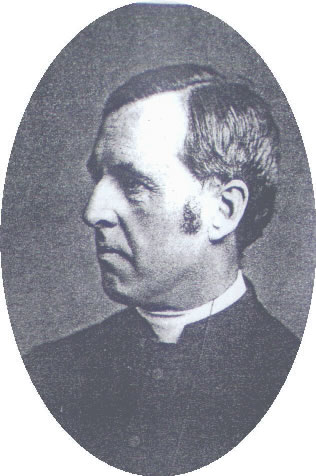
- Born: 11 August 1825; Fareham, Hampshire, England
- Died: 15 December 1887 (aged 62)
- Education: Wadham College, Oxford
- Occupation: Mission Priest
- Known for: ritualism

Alexander Heriot Mackonochie SSC (11 August 1825 – 15 December 1887) was a Church of England mission priest known as "the martyr of St Alban's" on account of his prosecution and forced resignation for ritualist practices.

== Early life ==
Mackonochie was born in India, the third son of George Mackonochie (1775/6–1827), a retired colonel in the service of the East India Company, and his wife, Isabella Alison. Through his mother he had a traditional Low Church upbringing and his family were opponents of the early Catholic Revival. Mackonochie was educated at private schools in Bath and Exeter. Early on he felt a call to the Ministry of the Church and gained the nickname "the boy-bishop" among his contemporaries. He attended lectures at Edinburgh University before matriculating at Wadham College, Oxford in 1844. He graduated BA in 1848 and MA in 1851.

Oxford was the centre of the two-decades-old Oxford Movement, the leading force in English Anglo-Catholicism. There are conflicting accounts of his theological opinions while at Oxford. Some describe Mackonochie as having "pronounced Low Church views", but he heard Pusey preach and was on personal terms with many of the other leading Anglo-Catholics of the day, especially Charles Marriott. However, we can be sure that during his time at the university he came into contact with the vanguard of the Oxford Movement, though he may not have shared its views at this early stage in his life.

== Ordination and early parish ministry ==
Mackonochie was ordained in Lent 1849 and became a curate at Westbury, Wiltshire. In 1852, he became a curate of W. J. Butler at Wantage, Berkshire. Butler was a Tractarian and at Wantage Mackonochie followed a typical Anglo-Catholic pattern of ministry. Mackonochie taught in the Church schools and had special responsibility for the nearby district of Charlton, preaching forcefully.

== London Docks and Holborn ==
In 1858, he moved to become a curate at St George's-in-the-East, London. There he worked with Charles Fuge Lowder as a mission priest in the slum areas of London Docks. At this time St George's-in-the-East was a focus for anti-Ritualist rioting which included services being interrupted and stones being thrown at the mission's priests.

In 1862, Mackonochie became perpetual curate at St Alban the Martyr, Holborn. In a letter to the patron, John Gellibrand Hubbard, he explained his theological opinions, which included endorsing the (for that time) radically Catholic eucharistic doctrine of G. A. Denison. Mackonochie introduced a daily Eucharist, which featured Gregorian chant and significant ritual elements (e.g. the lighting of altar candles and the cleansing of eucharistic vessels at the altar). St Alban's was the first Anglican church to hold the three-hour devotion on Good Friday (in 1864) and one of the first to celebrate a Harvest Festival. Mackonochie also openly heard confessions. Mackonochie's pastoral ministry was typical of the 19th-century ritualist "slum priest". With his two curates, Arthur Stanton and Edward Russell, and lay assistants he founded schools, soup kitchens, a working men's club, mothers' meetings, clothing funds and more. Throughout Mackonochie's later persecution St Alban's remained a thriving Anglo-Catholic parish. From 1867 Mackonochie was also chaplain of the sisterhood of St Saviour and the sisters and sisters of the Clewer Community of St John Baptist worked in the parish.

== Prosecution ==
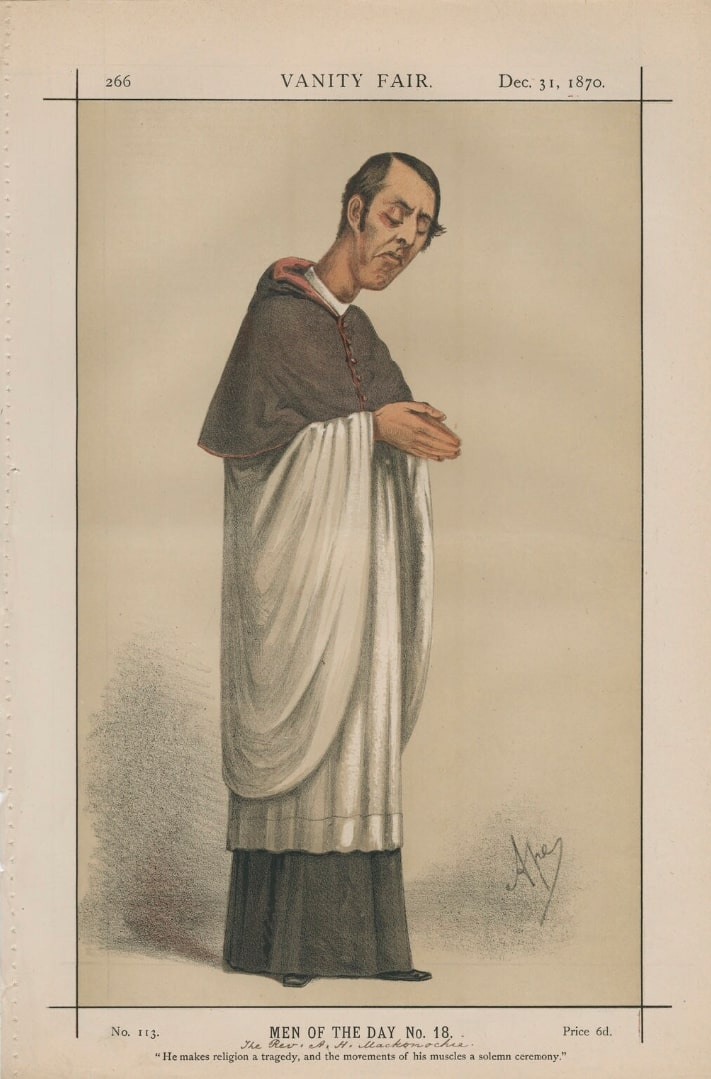
"He makes religion a tragedy, and the movements of his muscles a solemn ceremony" Mackonochie as caricatured by Ape (Carlo Pellegrini) in Vanity Fair, December 1870

St Alban's increasingly became a focus of Low Church ire, drawing the attention of Lord Shaftesbury and the ultra-Protestant and anti-ritualist Church Association. In 1867, a prosecution was brought against Mackonochie by John Martin, supported by the Church Association, under the Church Discipline Act 1840 (3 & 4 Vict. c. 86). The charges brought were elevating the host above his head, using a mixed chalice and altar lights, censing things and persons, and kneeling during the prayer of consecration. The first decision (of the Court of Arches) was against Mackonochie on two counts and in his favour on the other three, with no decision as to the payment of costs. Despite Mackonochie agreeing to comply, the anti-ritualists appealed to the Privy Council, which found against Mackonochie in the remaining three charges; and he was ordered to pay all costs. Even after the prosecution the Church Association continued to pursue Mackonochie, believing that he had re-introduced the prohibited ritual. This led to further judgments against Mackonochie, culminating on 25 November 1870 with his suspension from office for three months. In the interim he had become a hate-figure for the Low Church; in 1869 he was banned from preaching in the Diocese of Ripon and a Low Church cleric, Hugh M‘Neile, refused to speak at the Liverpool Church Congress because Mackonochie would also be speaking.

A second lawsuit was brought in March 1874 repeating the old charges as well as adding new ones including the use of processions with a crucifix, the use of the Agnus Dei, and the ancient custom of the eastward-facing consecration. (The normal practice, prescribed by the Book of Common Prayer, was to stand at the north end of the altar facing south; westward-facing consecration, as is now most common in the Church of England, was only introduced by Cranmer and as an attempt to deemphasise the sacrificial nature of the traditional Mass.) Mackonochie stood firm in the face of the prosecutions but on 12 June 1875 was found against on most of the charges and suspended for six weeks.

In 1878, John Martin appealed to the Dean of Arches, claiming that Mackonochie had not obeyed the 1875 judgement. Mackonochie was brought in front of the new court created by the Public Worship Regulation Act 1874. Mackonochie was suspended for three years at this time.

In 1882 a fresh round of prosecutions was under way when, at the deathbed request of Archbishop Tait, Mackonochie resigned from St Alban's to move to St Peter's, London Docks, the church founded in 1866 by C.F. Lowder. Though by 1882 the mob violence that Mackonochie had faced during his time with Lowder in the 1850s and 1860s had abated, the prosecutions continued. Despite the vibrancy of St Peter's Mackonochie was extremely unhappy: he had moved from St Alban's out of a sense of duty. He missed his old parish and his self-confidence was waning. By July 1883 he faced yet another suspension. In December, knowing his suspension would be disastrous for the parish, and only a year after resigning from St Alban's, he handed his resignation to the Bishop. Unlike his resignation from St Alban's, his friends almost unanimously supported this resignation, knowing it was required for the good of both the parish and his health.

== Later life and death ==
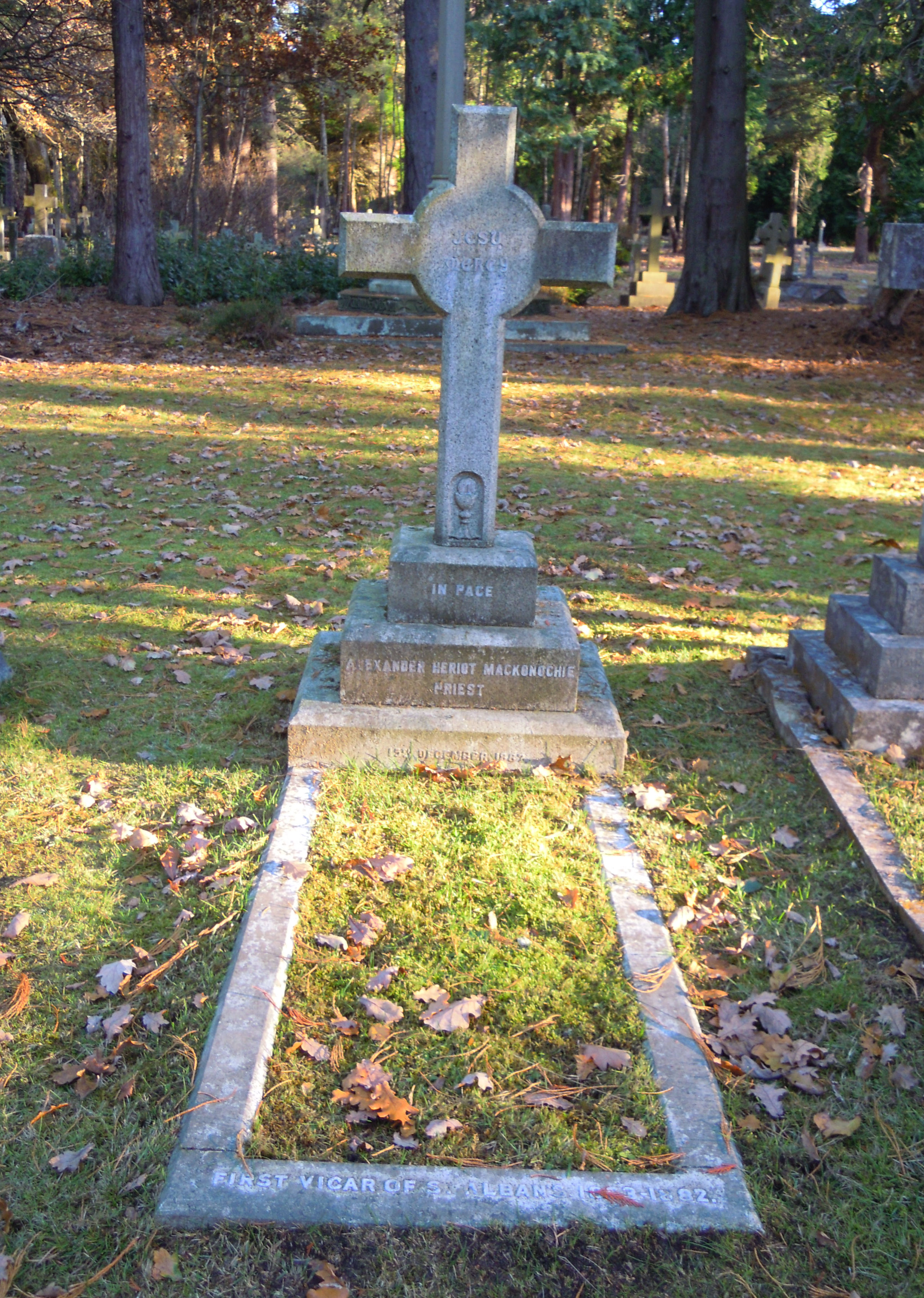
Mackonochie's grave in Brookwood Cemetery

Mackonochie did not think of taking another parish and moved into the Clergy House of St Alban's as a freelance. This was a happy arrangement for all, and there was no clash between the old priest and the new (Fr Suckling). For a time Mackonochie undertook a fair amount of work in the parish, but he was weakening mentally. He travelled several times to the continent and often visited the Bishop of Argyll, and his friend Alexander Chinnery-Haldane, in Ballachulish, Scotland, a place which he loved. Increasingly his home was his brother's house at Wantage, another place very dear to his heart, where he continued to assist in parochial work as much as possible.

His mental decline continued apace until on 15 December 1887 he got lost in the Forest of Mamore while out walking near the Bishop of Argyll's home in Ballachulish. His body was found two days later guarded by the dogs he had been with. After a packed Requiem Mass at St Alban's a special train took mourners to Woking where his body was laid to rest in the cemetery. A cross of Scottish granite was later raised on the spot where he had died, and in the 1890s a chapel was dedicated to his memory at St Alban's.

The circumstances of Mackonochie's death were commemorated in a poem by William McGonagall. He is buried in Brookwood Cemetery.

== Role in the broader Anglo-Catholic Movement ==
Besides his work in Holborn and London Docks, Mackonochie was also a leading member of the broader Catholic revival. He was one of the first Priest Associates of the Confraternity of the Blessed Sacrament and served as Master of the Society of the Holy Cross (SSC) in 1863–1875, 1879–1881 and 1885. He was a major force in the formulation of the Society's constitution and, as Master, had an important role in directing its activities. Under Mackonochie the Society increasingly represented the vanguard of the Anglo-Catholic movement.

== See also ==
- Society of the Holy Cross
- Confraternity of the Blessed Sacrament
- Ritualism
- T. Pelham Dale
- Richard William Enraght
- Sidney Faithorn Green
- Arthur Tooth

== Sources ==
- Archbold, William Arthur Jobson (1893). "Mackonochie, Alexander Heriot" . In Lee, Sidney (ed.). Dictionary of National Biography. Vol. 35. London: Smith, Elder & Co.
- Towle, E.A. (1890). Russell, E.F. (ed.). Alexander Mackonochie: A Memoir. New York: E. and J.B. Young.
- Reynolds, Michael (1965). Martyr of Ritualism: Father Mackonochie of St. Alban's, Holborn. London: Faber and Faber.
- Mitchell, Rosemary. "Mackonochie, Alexander Heriot (1825–1887)". Oxford Dictionary of National Biography (online ed.). Oxford University Press. doi:10.1093/ref:odnb/17627. (Subscription, Wikipedia Library access or UK public library membership required.)
- "MACKONOCHIE". Vol. LI, no. 301. The Hartford Courant. 21 December 1887.
