= Prudentius =

Roman Christian poet (348–c.413)

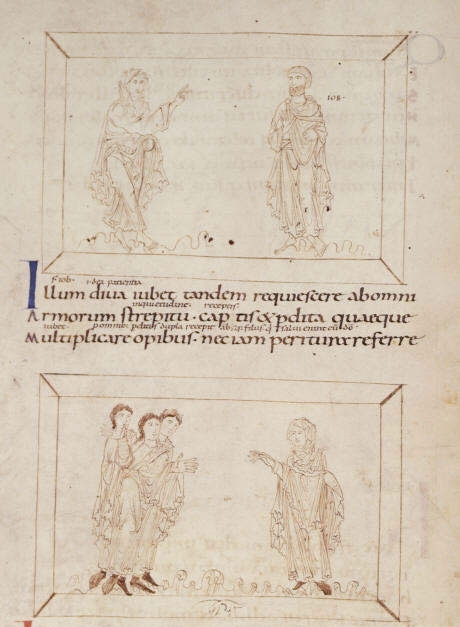

Aurelius Prudentius Clemens (/pruːˈdɛnʃ(i)əs/ proo-DEN-sh(ee-)əs) was a Roman Christian poet, born in the Roman province of Tarraconensis (the northern part of the Iberian Peninsula) in 348. He probably died in the Iberian Peninsula some time after 405, possibly around 413. The place of his birth is uncertain, but it may have been Caesaraugusta (Zaragoza), Tarraco (Tarragona), or Calagurris (Calahorra).

== Life ==
Prudentius practiced law with some success, and was twice provincial governor, perhaps in his native country, before the emperor Theodosius I summoned him to court. Towards the end of his life (possibly around 392) Prudentius retired from public life to become an ascetic, fasting until evening and abstaining entirely from animal food; and writing poems, hymns, and controversial works in defence of Christianity. Prudentius later collected the Christian poems written during this period and added a preface, which he himself dated 405.

== Poetry ==
The poetry of Prudentius is influenced by early Christian authors, such as Tertullian and St. Ambrose, as well as the Bible and the acts of the martyrs. His hymn Da, puer, plectrum (including "Corde natus ex parentis": "Of the Father's Heart Begotten") and the hymn for Epiphany O sola magnarum urbium ("Earth Has Many a Noble City"), both from the Cathemerinon, are still in use today.

The allegorical Psychomachia, however, is his most influential work, incorporating as it did elements of both Hellenic epic and inner psychological conflict. It became the inspiration and wellspring of medieval allegorical literature, its influence (according to C. S. Lewis) exceeding its intrinsic artistic merit. In the battle between virtue and vice, full weight is given to the power of Luxuria, "Flowershod and swaying from the wine cup, Every step a fragrance". With her attendants Beauty and Pleasure, and her weapons of rose-petals and violets, she succeeds in swaying the army of Virtue "in surrender to love", before succumbing to ultimate defeat.

== Influence ==
With his merger of Christianity with classical culture, Prudentius was one of the most popular medieval authors, being aligned as late as the 13th century alongside such figures as Horace and Statius in Henri d'Andeli's Battle of the Seven Arts between Grammar (poetry) and Logic.

== Works ==
The list of Prudentius's works given in the preface to his autobiography mentions the hymns, poems against the Priscillianists and against Symmachus and Peristephanon. The Diptychon is not mentioned. The twelve hymns of the Cathemerinon liber ("Daily Round") consist of six for daily use, five for festivals, and one intended for every hour of the day.

The specific works include:

- Liber Cathemerinon -- ("Book in Accordance with the Hours") comprises 12 lyric poems on various times of the day and on church festivals.
- Liber Peristephanon -- ("Crowns of Martyrdom") contains 14 lyric poems on Iberian and Roman martyrs. Some were suggested to Prudentius by sacred images in churches or by the inscriptions of Pope Damasus I.
- Apotheosis -- ("Deification") attacks disclaimers of the Trinity and the divinity of Jesus.
- Hamartigenia -- ("The Origin of Sin") attacks the Gnostic dualism of Marcion and his followers. In this and the Apotheosis, Tertullian is the source of inspiration.
- Psychomachia -- ("Battle of Souls") describes the struggle of faith, supported by the cardinal virtues, against idolatry and the corresponding vices.
- Libri contra Symmachum -- ("Books Against Symmachus") oppose the pagan senator Symmachus's requests that the altar of Victory, which had been removed by Gratian, be restored to the Senate house.
- Dittochæon -- ("The Double Testament") contains 49 quatrains intended as captions for the murals of a basilica in Rome.

=== Editions ===
- Bergman, J. (ed.). Aurelii Prudenti Clementis carmina. Vienna: Hölder-Pichler-Tempsky, 1926. (Corpus Scriptorum Ecclesiasticorum Latinorum, 61).
- Cunningham, M.P. (ed.). Aurelii Prudentii Clementis Carmina. Turnhout: Brepols, 1966 (Corpus Christianorum. Series Latina, 126).
- Thomson, H.J. (ed. and trans.). Prudentius. 2 vols. Cambridge, Massachusetts: Harvard University Press, 1949-53 (Loeb Classical Library).
- Tränkle, H. (ed.). Prudentius, Contra Symmachum - Gegen Symmachus. Turnhout: Brepols, 2008. 284 p. (Fontes Christiani, 85).

== See also ==
- Allegory in the Middle Ages
- Ausonius
- Of the Father's Heart Begotten
- Paulinus of Nola
- Sidonius Apollinaris
- Quicumque Christum Quærtis
