= Charles Maurice Davies =

- Born: 1828; Wells, Somerset, England
- Died: 1910 (aged 81–82)
- Occupations: Clergyman, journalist
- Known for: Mystic London

Charles Maurice Davies (1828–1910) was an Anglican clergyman, writer and spiritualist.

== Early life ==
Charles Maurice Davies was born in 1828 in Wells, Somerset. He entered University College, Durham in 1845, graduating with a second-class BA in Classics in 1848. He was elected a fellow of Durham University in 1849. In 1851 he was ordained a deacon, and in 1852 was ordained a priest. He served as a curate in various parishes. He married Jane Anne Greenaway in 1856.

== Career ==
Davies was at first associated with the "high church" Anglicans, whose thinking was closer to Roman Catholic than Protestant traditions. On 28 February 1855 Davies and five other Anglican clergy met at the House of Charity, Rose Street, Soho, London, and founded the Anglo-Catholic Society of the Holy Cross. Davies at that time was curate of St Matthew's, City Road, in London. The leader of the group was Charles Lowder. The other founders were David Nicols, Alfred Poole, Joseph Newton Smith and Henry Augustus Rawes. For a short period Davies became a Roman Catholic, before rejoining the Church of England as a liberal. In his later years Davies identified himself as a "broad churchman" and thought the church should tolerate a wide range of beliefs and practices.

Davies moved to Paris where he taught Classics and Modern English. Spiritualism was in vogue in Paris at that time, and Davies' wife began experimenting with automatic writing. His brother was also interested in spiritualism, and Davies himself was eventually convinced by the results of a seance. After his son died in 1865 Davies became committed to spiritualism. He did not play an active role in spiritualism until August 1874, when he attended a spiritualist conference in Gower Street, London. He was a member of the British National Association of Spiritualists.

From 1861 to 1868 Davies was headmaster of the West London Collegiate School. After this he increasingly devoted himself to journalism. In 1870 he represented The Daily Telegraph in France on the outbreak of the Franco-Prussian War and was arrested as a suspected spy while searching Metz for his colleague, George Augustus Sala. In 1875 Davies was briefly lecturer at the church of St George-in-the-East in Stepney. In 1881 he called himself "a Sunday Evening Lecturer at Chelsea Parish Church", but he left holy orders after 1882. He continued to believe that Christianity and spiritualism were complementary beliefs.

On his resettling in London, he was employed after 1893 in superintending a series of translations, undertaken at the instance of Cecil Rhodes, of the original authorities used by Edward Gibbon in his Decline and Fall of the Roman Empire. Nearly thirty scholars worked under his supervision and over a hundred volumes were completed. Davies retired from active work in 1901, and died at his home, 50 Connaught Road, Harlesden, London, on 6 September 1910.

== Work ==
Charles Maurice Davies sometimes wrote under the pseudonyms "A Church of England Clergyman", "C M D" and "An Ex-Puseyite". He is best known for his novels Philip Paternoster (1858), Shadow Land (1860), Broad Church (1875) and 'Verts (1876). His journalistic works were published in the collections Unorthodox London (1873), Heterodox London (1874), Orthodox London (1874–75) and Mystic London (1875). They may be seen as works of urban ethnography, examining the cultures of the various religious groups and exploring the extent to which unorthodox religious practices could be tolerated by the Church of England.

== Publications ==
Davies was a prolific author. Selected works:

Novels

- Davies, Charles Maurice (1858). Philip Paternoster, by an ex-Puseyite.
- Davies, Charles Maurice (1860). Shadow Land: a Story with a Purpose. By the Author of "Philip Paternoster, Etc.".
- Davies, Charles Maurice (1875a). Broad church: three volumes in one. Garland.
- Davies, Charles Maurice (1876). 'Verts; or, The three creeds. Tinsley Bros.

Journalism

- Davies, Charles Maurice (1874). Unorthodox London: Or, Phases of Religious Life in the Metropolis. Tinsley Bros.
- Davies, Charles Maurice (1874). Heterodox London V2: Or, Phases of Free Thought in the Metropolis. Kessinger Publishing. ISBN 978-0-548-18364-9.
- Davies, Charles Maurice (1874–75). Orthodox London. Read Books Design. ISBN 978-1-4460-0472-2.
- Davies, Charles Maurice (1875b). Mystic London: Or, Phases of Occult Life in the Metropolis. Cambridge University Press. ISBN 978-1-108-02743-4.

Miscellaneous

- Davies, Charles Maurice (1859). Hyper-Tractarianism. Being a Letter Addressed to the Lord Bishop of London. By the Author of "Philip Paternoster" [i.e. Charles M. Davies], Etc. London.
- Davies, Charles Maurice; Bentley, Richard (1861). A Tractarian Love Story. Richard Bentley.
- Davies, Charles Maurice (1874). Anti-Sillyass: Or, The Modern Odyssey. Tinsley.
- Davies, Charles Maurice (1875c). London Sermons. Tinsley.
- Davies, Charles Maurice (1877). Maud Blount, Medium: A Story of Modern Spiritualism. Tinsley Brothers.
- Davies, Charles Maurice (1878). Fun, Ancient and Modern. Tinsley brothers.
- Davies, Charles Maurice (1884). The Future that Awaits Us. The Appearances of Jesus During the Great Forty Days, Viewed as a Revelation of the Unseen World.
- Davies, Charles Maurice (1895). The Great Secret and Its Unfoldment in Occultism: A Record of Forty Years' Experience in the Modern Mystery. G. Redway.
