= Earth Has Many a Noble City =

Christian Epiphany hymn

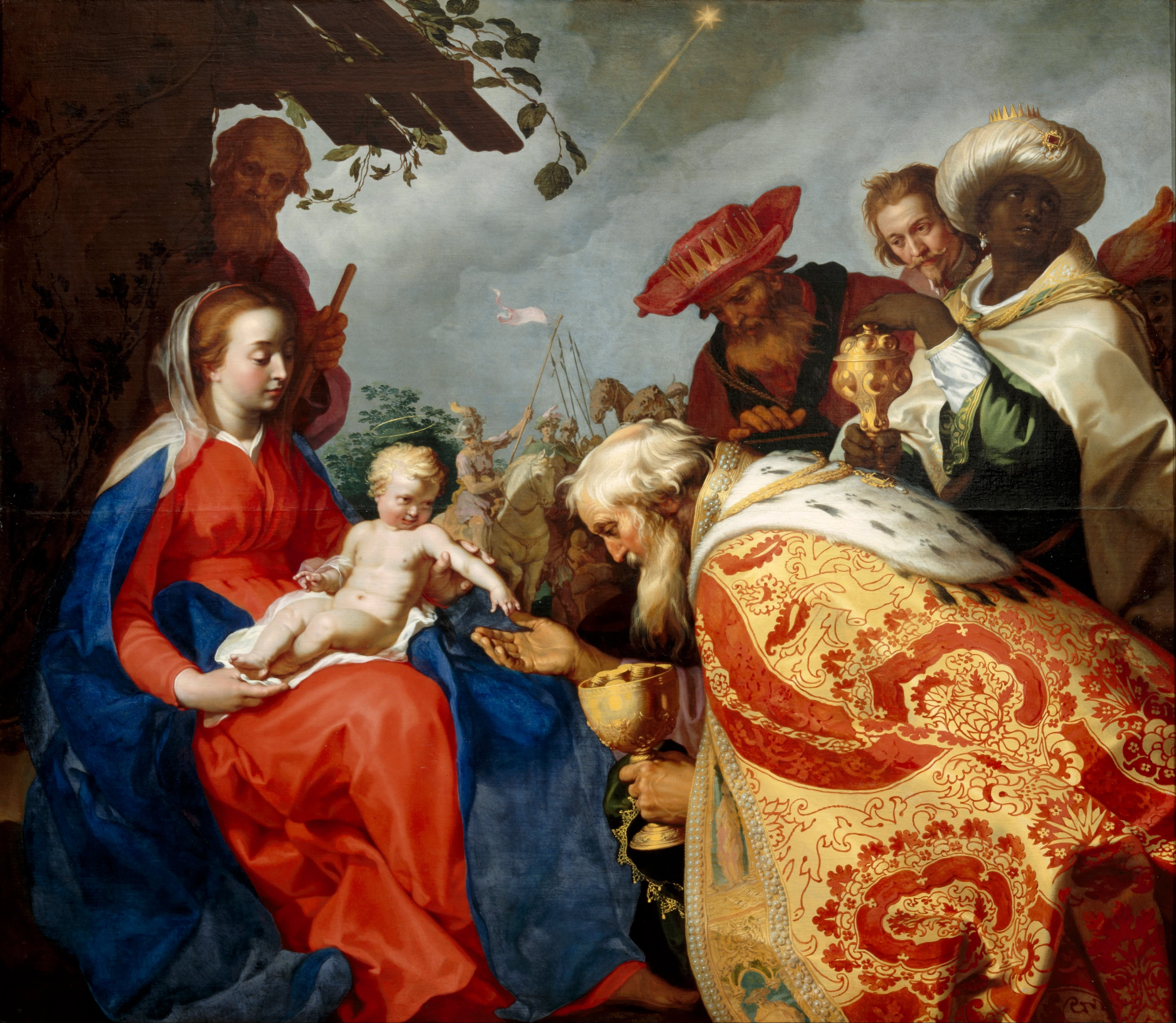
The Adoration of the Magi (1624) by Abraham Bloemaert

"Earth Has Many a Noble City" (Latin: "O sola magnarum urbium") is a Christian Epiphany hymn originally written by the Roman poet Aurelius Clemens Prudentius and translated by the English clergyman Edward Caswall in 1849.

== History ==
Aurelius Clemens Prudentius was a provincial Roman governor for the Roman Emperor Theodosius I in Hispania Tarraconensis (modern-day Spain). In 405 AD, he published a number of Latin Christian prayers and hymns in his Liber Cathemerinon book which included "O sola magnarum urbium" which would become "Earth Has Many a Noble City".

Edward Caswall was an English clergyman who had converted from the Church of England to the Roman Catholic Church in 1847. Shortly after his conversion, he was inspired by the translation of Latin hymns into English by Cardinal John Newman. In 1849, he published Lyra Catholica featuring a number of Latin hymns that he had translated into English, including "Earth Has Many a Noble City".

The hymn later received several amendments and variations from its original translation. In 1861, Caswall himself re-translated the hymn to compose "Bethlehem! of noblest cities". However, hymnologists have debated whether "Earth Has Many a Noble City" was Caswall's original translation with the hymns of "Bethlehem! Of Noblest Cities" or "Bethlehem, Not the Least of All Cities" being posited as possible alternative translations.

== Lyrics ==
The English translation of the hymn focuses on Epiphany with the biblical Magi following the Star of Bethlehem to the Baby Jesus and their offering of gifts of gold, frankincense, and myrrh. The hymn is commonly set to "Stuttgart", using the same tune as sometimes used by the Advent carol "Come, Thou Long Expected Jesus" although "Cross of Jesus" is the more usual melody for the latter.
