= Carleton Mill =

Mill building in Carleton-in-Craven, North Yorkshire, England

Coordinates: 53.9433°N 2.0440°W

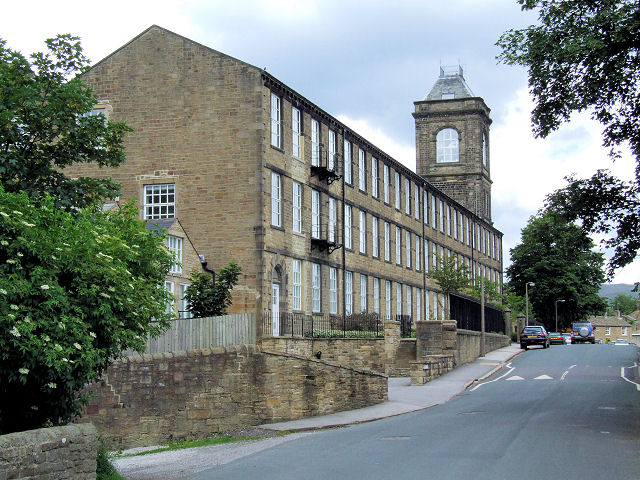
The building, in 2007

Carleton Mill is a historic building in Carleton-in-Craven, a village in North Yorkshire, in England.

William and John Slingsby leased a mill in Bell Busk in 1841. It proved successful, and in 1849 they were able to construct a small mill in Carleton. In 1861, they built a larger mill in the village, to work cotton. Ownership passed to their sons, Cecil and John Arthur, but the two had a poor working relationship, and in 1930 the business failed. The mill was purchased by the Fattorini family, which used it to run a mail order business. In 1941, it was purchased by the Rover Company, which used it to manufacture aircraft components. The Aspinall family took it over in 1947, to manufacture carpets, then in 1980 Gaskell PLC took it over, continuing to make carpets. It closed in 1999, and in 2003 was converted into 57 flats and houses by Novo Homes and Peter Harrison Architects. It has been Grade II listed since 1988.

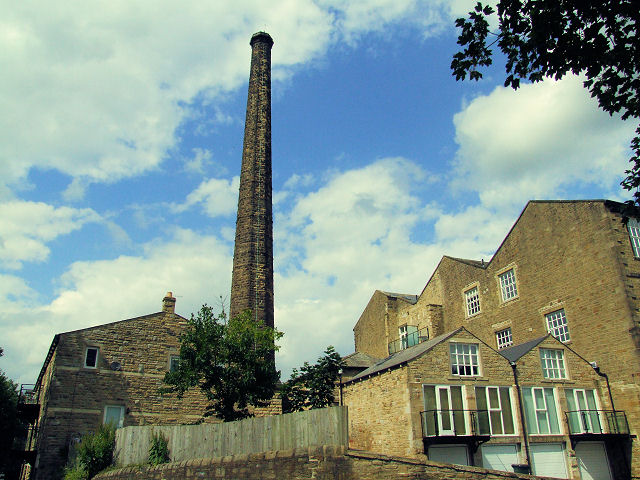
The chimney

The mill is built of stone with lintel bands, a dentilled cornice, a slate roof, and three storeys. The doorway is round-headed with a rusticated surround, and the windows have plain surrounds. At the east end is a tower with two cornices, pilaster strips and a parapet. The top storey contains elliptical-headed windows in architraves, and above is a truncated pyramidal roof with railings. At the west end is a tall octagonal chimney. In the centre of the mill is an open air atrium, with a water feature and glass-fronted lift.

== See also ==
- Listed buildings in Carleton-in-Craven
