= Lucis creator optime =

Christian hymn attributed to Pope Gregory I

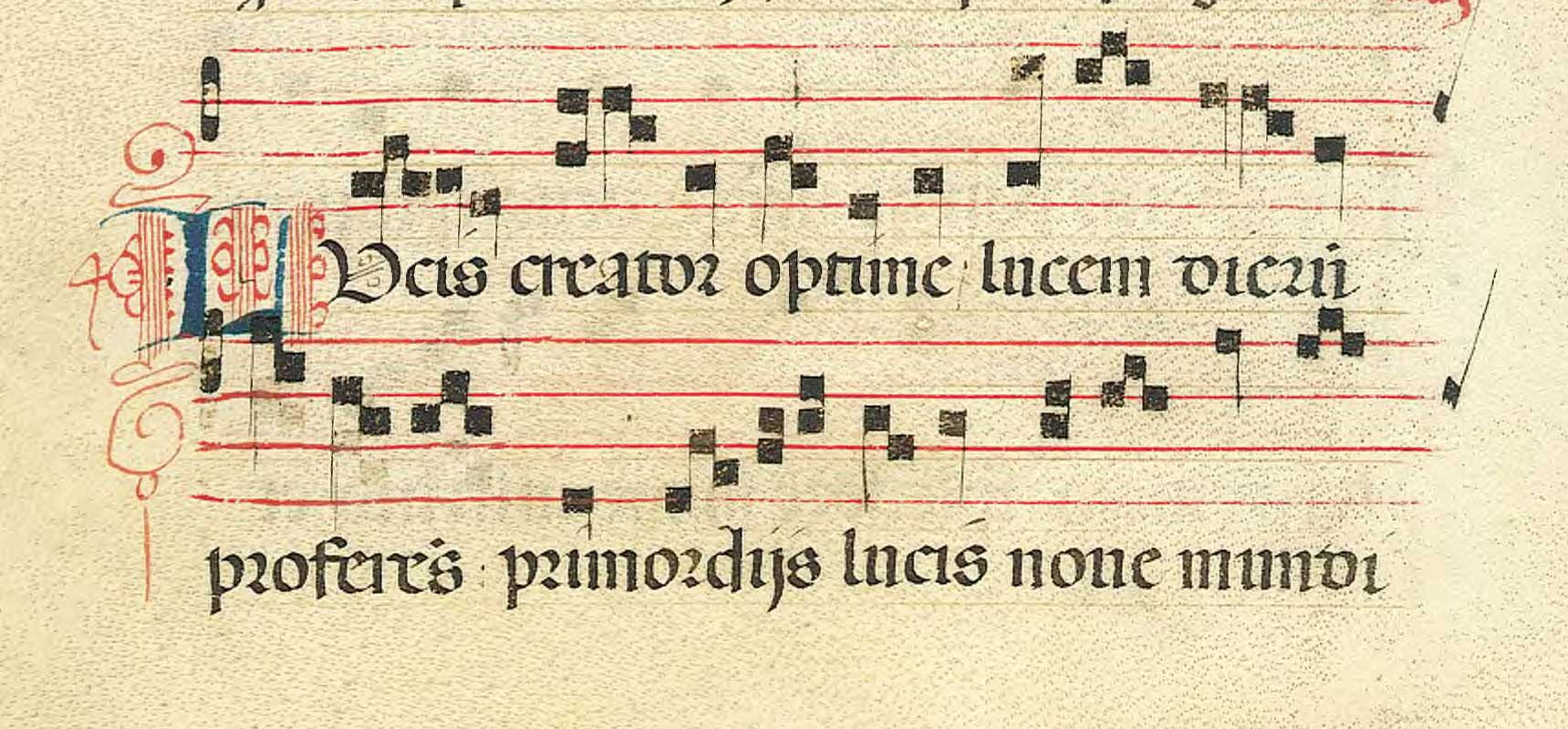
A 14th-century manuscript of Lucis Creator Optime

Lucis Creator Optime is a 5th-century Latin Christian hymn variously attributed to St Gregory the Great or Saint Ambrose. It takes its title from its incipit.

In modern usage, it is commonly known in English translation as "O Blest Creator of the Light", and may be sung to a number of different settings.

== History ==
The authorship of Lucis Creator Optime is uncertain; the hymn has been attributed to St Gregory the Great or Saint Ambrose. Historian Franz Mone identified it in 8th-century manuscripts from Darmstadt and Trier and considered it to be an early 5th-century work, while other scholars have dated it as a much later work.

The hymn is found in 11th-century English hymnaries held at the British Museum and Corpus Christi College, Cambridge, and in an 11th C Spanish breviary.

Lucis Creator Optime was sung as the first hymn for Sunday Vespers in monasteries.

In the Roman Breviary, Lucis Creator Optime is set for Vespers on Sundays after Epiphany and Sundays after Pentecost. In the Liturgy of the Hours the hymn is set for Sunday evening Vespers for the first and third weeks in Ordinary time.

== Text and translations ==
Latin text

Lucis creator optime,
lucem dierum proferens,
primordiis lucis novae,
mundi parans originem.

Qui mane junctum vesperi,
diem vocari praecipis,
illabitur tetrum chaos,
audi preces cum fletibus.

Ne mens gravata crimine,
vitae sit exsul munere,
dum nil perenne cogitat,
seseque culpis illigat.

Caeleste pulset ostium,
vitale tollat praemium,
vitemus omne noxium,
purgemus omne pessimum.

Praesta Pater piissime,
Patrique compar unice,
cum Spiritu paraclito,
regnans per omne saeculum.

English translation by John Henry Newman

Father of Lights, by whom each day
Is kindled out of night,
Who, when the heavens were made, didst lay
Their rudiments in light;

Thou, who didst bind and blend in one
The glistening morn and evening pale,
Hear Thou our plaint, when light is gone,
And lawlessness and strife prevail.

Hear, lest the whelming weight of crime
Wreck us with life in view;
Lest thoughts and schemes of sense and time
Earn us a sinner's due.

So may we knock at Heaven's door,
And strive the immortal prize to win,
Continually and evermore
Guarded without and pure within.

Grant this, O Father, Only Son,
And Spirit, God of grace,
To whom all worship shall be done
In every time and place.

English translation by John Mason Neale

O Blest Creator of the light,
Who mak'st the day with radiance bright,
and o'er the forming world didst call
the light from chaos first of all;

Whose wisdom joined in meet array
the morn and eve, and named them Day:
night comes with all its darkling fears;
regard Thy people's prayers and tears.

Lest, sunk in sin, and whelmed with strife,
they lose the gift of endless life;
while thinking but the thoughts of time,
they weave new chains of woe and crime.

But grant them grace that they may strain
the heavenly gate and prize to gain:
each harmful lure aside to cast,
and purge away each error past.

O Father, that we ask be done,
through Jesus Christ, Thine only Son;
Who, with the Holy Ghost and Thee,
doth live and reign eternally. Amen.

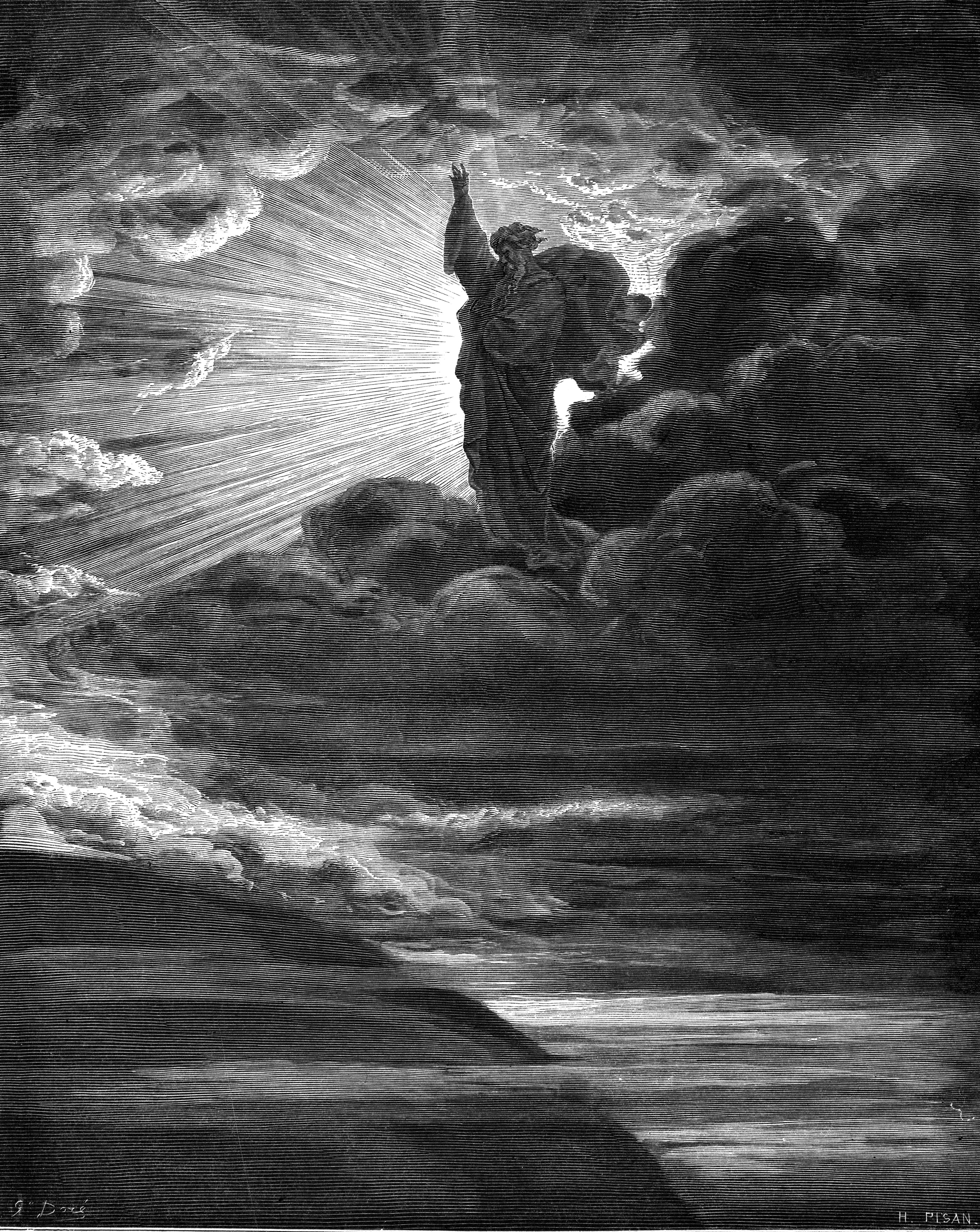
The hymn refers to God as the creator of light, as depicted in Genesis

Lucis Creator Optime makes reference to the first part of the Genesis creation narrative described in Genesis 1:3–5: "And God said, Let there be light: and there was light." In the daily pattern of Vespers in the Roman Breviary, Lucis Creator Optime is the first in a sequence of hymns which allude to the seven days of the Biblical creation. As with much traditional evening hymnody in Christian worship, the text makes reference to the creation of life by God, and allusions to the sun's rays and contrasting shadows are metaphors for the concepts of divine grace and original sin.

A translation of the hymn was published in 1706 in The Primer Or Office of the Blessed Virgin Mary in English "O august Creator of the light, who didst bring forth the light of day". It was later reprinted by Orby Shipley in his Arnius Sanctus and has been attributed to the poet John Dryden. The hymn has since been translated for use in modern worship by numerous authors. John Henry Newman rendered it as "Father of Lights, by Whom Each Day" in Tracts for the Times (1836). Edward Caswall translated it as "O blest Creator of the light, Who dost the dawn from darkness bring", published in his Lyra Catholica (1849). John Mason Neale's version, "O blest Creator of the light, Who mak’st the day with radiance bright" followed in 1852.

== Musical settings ==
Lucis Creator Optime appears in several modern hymnals. In the Church of England an adapted version of Caswall's translation by J. Chandler was included in William Henry Monk's 1861 hymnbook, Hymns Ancient and Modern.

In 1906 Percy Dearmer published an adapted text based on Neale's translation in The English Hymnal, and the hymn was retained in the successor volume, The New English Hymnal (1986).

The hymn metre 8.8.8.8 may be sung to the original plainchant melody, or to the hymn tune Lucis Creator, a traditional 16th-century melody originating from Angers. The hymn has also been set to a tune named Bromley, composed by Jeremiah Clarke around 1700. The manuscript for Clarke's tune was later discovered in the Foundling Hospital in London.

A number of choral settings of the hymn have been written by notable composers, including settings by Tomás Luis de Victoria, Giovanni Pierluigi da Palestrina, and a setting by Knut Nystedt for soloists, chorus and orchestra. Marcel Dupré and Jehan Alain composed organ pieces based on the plainchant.
