= Of the Father's Heart Begotten =

Christmas carol

Of the Father's heart begotten
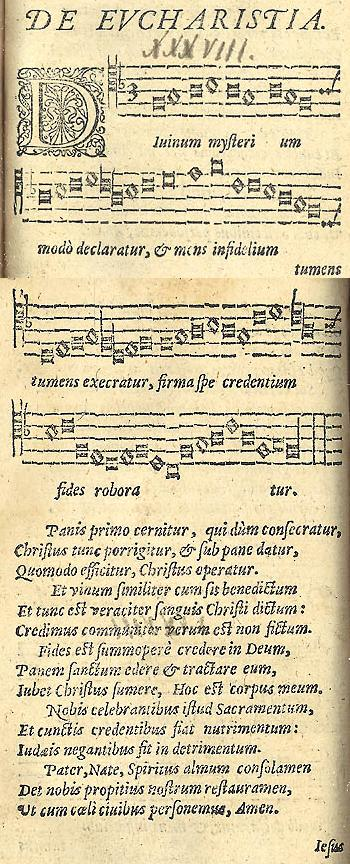
- The original plainsong of "Divinum mysterium" in Piae Cantiones
- Native name: Corde natus
- Genre: Christmas carol
- Text: Aurelius Prudentius, translated by John Mason Neale, Henry W. Baker, Roby Furley Davis
- Based on: John 3:16
- Meter: 8.7.8.7.8.7.7
- Melody: "Divinum mysterium"
- Published: 1582

"Of the Father's heart begotten", alternatively known as "Of the Father's love begotten", is a doctrinal hymn based on the Latin poem "Corde natus" by the Roman poet Aurelius Prudentius, from his Liber Cathemerinon (hymn no. IX) beginning "Da puer plectrum" which includes the Latin stanzas listed below.

== History ==
The ancient poem was translated and paired with a medieval plainchant melody "Divinum mysterium". "Divinum mysterium" was a "Sanctus trope" – an ancient plainchant melody which over the years had been musically embellished. An early version of this chant appears in manuscript form as early as the 10th century, although without the melodic additions, and "trope" versions with various melodic differences appear in Italian, German, Gallacian, Bohemian and Spanish manuscripts dating from the 13th to 16th centuries.

"Divinum mysterium" first appears in print in 1582 in the Finnish song book Piae Cantiones, a collection of seventy-four sacred and secular church and school songs of medieval Europe compiled by Jaakko Suomalainen and published by Theodoric Petri. In this collection, "Divinum mysterium" was classified as "De Eucharistia", reflecting its original use for the Mass.

The text of the "Divinum mysterium" was replaced by the words of Prudentius's poem when it was published by Thomas Helmore in 1851. In making this fusion, the original metre of the chant was disturbed, changing the original triple metre rhythm into a duple metre and therefore altering stresses and note lengths. A later version by Charles Winfred Douglas (1867–1944) corrected this using an "equalist" method of transcription, although the hymn is now found in both versions as well as a more dance-like interpretation of the original melody.

== Translations ==
There are two translations commonly sung today; one by John Mason Neale and Henry W. Baker, and another by Roby Furley Davis.

Neale's original translation began "Of the Father sole begotten" in his Hymnal Noted (London, 1851), and contained only six stanzas (of the original Latin poem's thirty-eight). It was Neale's music editor, Thomas Helmore, who paired this hymn with the Latin plainsong. Neale's translation was later edited and extended to nine stanzas by Henry W. Baker for Hymns Ancient and Modern (London, 1861; below).

Dissatisfied with Neale's translation, Roby Furley Davis (1866–1937), a scholar at St John's College, Cambridge, wrote a new version for The English Hymnal of 1906. Davis was assistant master at Weymouth College and a scholar of the works of Tacitus, especially his book on Agricola. This version was also used in the popular Carols for Choirs series by David Willcocks.

== Text and translations ==
Latin text by Prudentius (born 348)	Translation by Roby Furley Davis for The English Hymnal (1906)	Translation by J. M. Neale, extended by Henry W. Baker (1851/1861)
Corde natus ex parentis Ante mundi exordium A et O cognominatus, ipse fons et clausula Omnium quæ sunt, fuerunt, quæque post futura sunt. Sæculorum sæculis.	Of the Father's heart begotten, Ere the world from chaos rose, He is Alpha, from that Fountain; All that is and hath been flows; He is Omega, of all things, Yet to come the mystic Close, Evermore and evermore.	Of the Father's love begotten, Ere the worlds began to be, He is Alpha and Omega, He the source, the ending He, Of the things that are, that have been, And that future years shall see, Evermore and evermore!
Ipse iussit et creata, dixit ipse et facta sunt, Terra, cælum, fossa ponti, trina rerum machina, Quæque in his vigent sub alto solis et lunæ globo. Sæculorum sæculis.	By His Word was all created He commanded and 'twas done; Earth and sky and boundless ocean, Universe of three in one, All that sees the moon's soft radiance, All that breathes beneath the sun, Evermore and evermore.	At His Word the worlds were framèd; He commanded; it was done: Heaven and earth and depths of ocean In their threefold order one; All that grows beneath the shining Of the moon and burning sun, Evermore and evermore!
Corporis formam caduci, membra morti obnoxia Induit, ne gens periret primoplasti ex germine, Merserat quem lex profundo noxialis tartaro. Sæculorum sæculis.	He assumed this mortal body, Frail and feeble, doomed to die, That the race from dust created, Might not perish utterly, Which the dreadful Law had sentenced In the depths of hell to lie, Evermore and evermore.	He is found in human fashion, Death and sorrow here to know, That the race of Adam's children Doomed by law to endless woe, May not henceforth die and perish In the dreadful gulf below, Evermore and evermore!
O beatus ortus ille, virgo cum puerpera Edidit nostram salutem, feta Sancto Spiritu, Et puer redemptor orbis os sacratum protulit. Sæculorum sæculis.	O how blest that wondrous birthday, When the Maid the curse retrieved, Brought to birth mankind's salvation By the Holy Ghost conceived, And the Babe, the world's Redeemer; In her loving arms received, Evermore and evermore.	O that birth forever blessèd, When the virgin, full of grace, By the Holy Ghost conceiving, Bore the Saviour of our race; And the Babe, the world's Redeemer, First revealed His sacred face, evermore and evermore!
Psallat altitudo caeli, psallite omnes angeli, Quidquid est virtutis usquam psallat in laudem Dei, Nulla linguarum silescat, vox et omnis consonet. Sæculorum sæculis.	Sing, ye heights of heaven, his praises; Angels and Archangels, sing! Wheresoe’er ye be, ye faithful, Let your joyous anthems ring, Every tongue his name confessing, Countless voices answering, Evermore and evermore.	O ye heights of heaven adore Him; Angel hosts, His praises sing; Powers, dominions, bow before Him, and extol our God and King! Let no tongue on earth be silent, Every voice in concert sing, Evermore and evermore!
Ecce, quem vates vetustis concinebant sæculis, Quem prophetarum fideles paginæ spoponderant, Emicat promissus olim; cuncta conlaudent eum. Sæculorum sæculis.	This is He, whom seer and sibyl Sang in ages long gone by,; This is He of old revealed In the page of prophecy; Lo! He comes the promised Saviour; Let the world his praises cry! Evermore and evermore.	This is He Whom seers in old time Chanted of with one accord; Whom the voices of the prophets Promised in their faithful word; Now He shines, the long expected, Let creation praise its Lord, Evermore and evermore!
Macte iudex mortuorum, macte rex viventium, Dexter in Parentis arce qui cluis virtutibus, Omnium venturus inde iustus ultor criminum. Sæculorum sæculis.	Hail! Thou Judge of souls departed; Hail! of all the living King! On the Father's right hand throned, Through his courts thy praises ring, Till at last for all offences Righteous judgement thou shalt bring, Evermore and evermore.	Righteous Judge of souls departed, Righteous King of them that live, On the Father's throne exalted None in might with Thee may strive; Who at last in vengeance coming Sinners from Thy face shalt drive, Evermore and evermore!
Te senes et te iuventus, parvulorum te chorus, Turba matrum, virginumque, simplices puellulæ, Voce concordes pudicis perstrepant concentibus. Sæculorum sæculis.	Now let old and young uniting Chant to thee harmonious lays Maid and matron hymn Thy glory, Infant lips their anthem raise, Boys and girls together singing With pure heart their song of praise, Evermore and evermore.	Thee let old men, Thee let young men, Thee let boys in chorus sing; Matrons, virgins, little maidens, With glad voices answering: Let their guileless songs re-echo, And the heart its music bring, Evermore and evermore!
Tibi, Christe, sit cum Patre hagioque Pneumate; Hymnus, decus, laus perennis, gratiarum actio, Honor, virtus, victoria, regnum aeternaliter. Sæculorum sæculis.	[stanza omitted]	Christ, to Thee with God the Father, And, O Holy Ghost, to Thee, Hymn and chant with high thanksgiving, And unwearied praises be: Honour, glory, and dominion, And eternal victory, Evermore and evermore!
Fluminum lapsus et undae littorum crepidines, Imber, aestus, nix, pruina, silva, et aura, nox, dies, Omnibus te concelebrent sæculorum sæculis, Sæculorum sæculis.	Let the storm and summer sunshine, Gliding stream and sounding shore, Sea and forest, frost and zephyr, Day and night their Lord adore; Let creation join to laud thee Through the ages evermore, Evermore and evermore.	[stanza omitted]

== See also ==
- List of Christmas carols
