= The Greek Psalter Incident =

Possibly fictitious event in the early Latter Day Saint movement

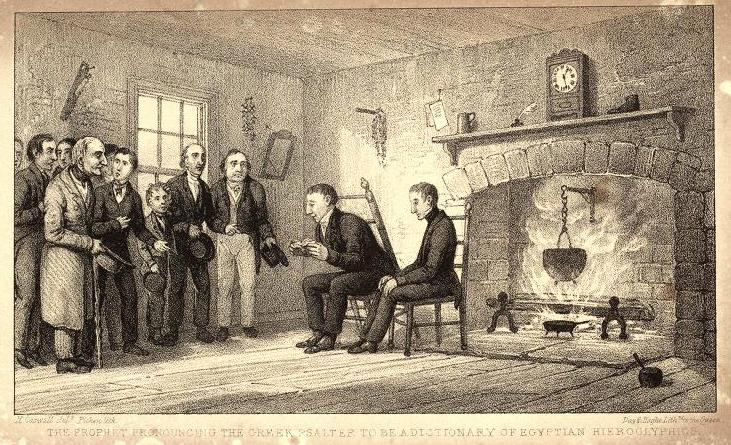
"The Prophet Pronouncing the Greek Psalter to be a Dictionary of Egyptian Hieroglyphics" from Caswell's 1843 book, Prophet of the Nineteenth Century.

The Greek Psalter Incident was a moment in the early history of the Latter Day Saint movement when Henry Caswall claimed to have asked Joseph Smith to translate an old Greek psalter he had in his possession on April 19, 1842, in Nauvoo, Illinois. Before meeting with Smith, Caswall was already aware of the psalter's contents and intended to use the request as a means of exposing Smith as a fraud.

== History ==
Henry Caswall authored a book titled Three Days in Nauvoo (also called The City of the Mormons) in which he gives an account of presenting Joseph Smith, the founder of the nascent Latter Day Saint movement, with an old Greek psalter to translate. Caswall was aware of Smith's previous claims regarding the translation of the Book of Mormon and the Book of Abraham from reformed Egyptian, and wanted to test the truthfulness of these claims. The Greek psalter's contents were well-established prior to the meeting and contained a common Greek translation of the Psalms.

Caswell claims that, after looking the manuscript over, Smith identified the manuscript as being a dictionary of Egyptian hieroglyphics and pointed to the capitalized letters, saying that they were hieroglyphics followed by their meanings in reformed Egyptian. Caswall goes on to claim that this is evidence of Smith's fraudulent character. The newspaper of a neighboring town, the Warsaw Message, creatively described the incident:

"Presently the spirit of prophecy began to arise within him; and he opened his mouth and spoke. That wonderful power, which enables him to see as far through a mill-stone as could Moses or Elijah of old, had already in the twinkling of an eye, made those rough and uncouth characters as plain to him as the nose on the face of the Professor. 'This Book,' said he, 'I pronounce to be a Dictionary of Ancient Egyptian Hieroglyphics!'

The brethren present were greatly astonished at this exhibition of their Prophet's power of revealing hidden things. After their exaltation had somewhat subsided, the Professor coolly told them that their Prophet was a base impostor! -- and that the book before them was but a plain Greek Psalter! -- Joe 'stepped out.'"

However, this is a cleaned up version of Caswall’s own account that does not match what he originally wrote in 1842. According to Caswall, Joseph Smith spoke with an exaggerated accent that other accounts of his bearing contradict him having; specifically, Caswall says he pointed at the Psalter and said phrases like “it ain’t Greek” and “Them figures is Egyptian,” among other things.

== Origins of the encounter ==
Henry Caswall was born into a prominent Anglican clerical family in England in 1810. His father, a vicar, descended from Sir George Caswall of Leominster and married the niece of Thomas Burgess, bishop of Salisbury.

In 1827 Caswall met bishop Philander Chase of Ohio who was in England soliciting donations for the fledgling Kenyon College located in what later became Gambier, Ohio. Chase persuaded Caswall to attend Kenyon, from which he graduated in November 1830. He became a deacon in the Protestant Episcopal Church in the United States of America six months later in 1831. Bishop Jackson Kemper ordained him a minister in 1837.

The Anglican church was not popular in the young United States, where its status as the state church of England made American citizens highly suspicious of it. Caswell moved to Canada in 1838, and it was there that he first expressed his opinions about the Latter-day Saint movement. However, he could not follow his ministerial profession there because at that time Anglican ministers ordained in the US could not serve in England and, as a colonial possession, Canada followed English ecclesiastical law.

In 1841 he therefore joined, as a professor of divinity, the college Bishop Kemper founded in St. Louis, Missouri in 1838; Kemper College. Years before visiting Smith, Caswall had written disparagingly about the Latter-day Saint movement, and in 1842 he expressed both frustration with the lack of support for the Anglican Church and the lack of professional opportunity this would bring, as well as envy at the success of the Latter-day Saint movement. He stated that watching so many English Latter-day Saints pass Kemper College on their way to Nauvoo is what motivated his visit there.

== Criticism of the event ==
A member of the Quorum of the Apostles and thus among the highest leaders of the church, John Taylor wrote in 1843 that Joseph conversed briefly with Caswall but declined to have anything to do with the book because Caswell seemed so nervous about it.

Taylor would say in 1850 that he had met Caswall while the latter was in Nauvoo. Caswall had said he wanted to see if "the Mormons" could tell him what it was; Taylor, who had learned Greek from his father, claimed he pointed at the book and said he believed it was a Greek Psalter.

While other sources corroborate Caswall presence in Nauvoo, Caswall alone claims he met Joseph Smith. As mentioned previously, Caswall gave Smith an exaggerated frontier accent other contemporary accounts say he did not have. Caswell described Smiths hands, which should have held the psalter, as "large and awkward," and "large and fat," while a St. Louis newspaper described Smiths hands as "quite small for his proportions."

Latter-day Saints were not unfamiliar with Greek. The Latter-day Saints established schools teaching Greek in both Kirtland in 1835 and Nauvoo in 1841. On November 20, 1835 Oliver Cowdery gave Smith Hebrew, Greek, and English dictionaries. Smith's diary records in 1835 that he studied Greek at home.
