= John Mason Neale =

Anglican priest and hymnwriter (1818–1866)

The Reverend John Mason Neale
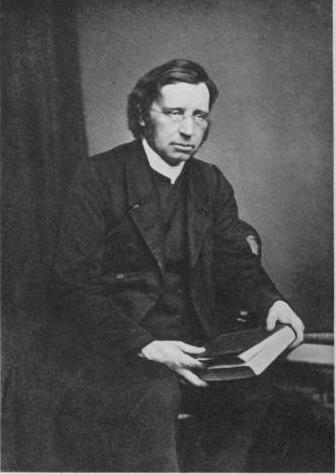
- Born: 24 January 1818; London, England
- Died: 6 August 1866 (aged 48); East Grinstead, England
- Education: Trinity College, Cambridge

Ecclesiastical career
- Religion: Christianity (Anglican)
- Church: Church of England
- Ordained: 1841

Signature
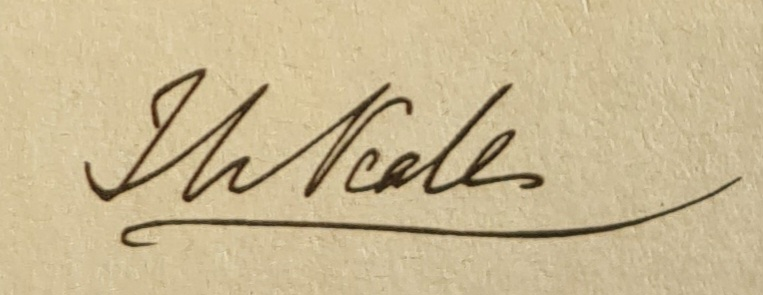

Notes
John Mason Neale
Sainthood
- Feast day: 7 August
- Venerated in: Anglican Communion

John Mason Neale (24 January 1818 – 6 August 1866) was an English Anglican priest, scholar, and hymnwriter. He worked on and wrote a wide range of holy Christian texts, including obscure medieval hymns, both Western and Eastern. Among his most famous hymns is the 1853 Good King Wenceslas, set on St. Stephen's day, known as Boxing Day in the UK. An Anglo-Catholic, Neale's works have found positive reception in high-church Anglicanism and Western Rite Orthodoxy.

== Life ==
Neale was born in London on 24 January 1818, his parents being the clergyman Cornelius Neale and Susanna Neale, daughter of John Mason Good. A younger sister Elizabeth Neale (1822–1901) founded the Community of the Holy Cross. He was educated at Sherborne School, Dorset, and Trinity College, Cambridge, where (despite being said to be the best classical scholar in his year) his lack of ability in mathematics prevented him taking an honours degree. Neale was named after the Puritan cleric and hymn writer John Mason (1645–94), of whom his mother Susanna was a descendant.

At the age of 22, Neale was the chaplain of Downing College, Cambridge. At Cambridge he was affected by the Oxford Movement and, particularly interested in church architecture, helped to found the Cambridge Camden Society (afterwards known as the Ecclesiological Society). The society advocated for more ritual and religious decoration in churches, and was closely associated with the Gothic Revival. Neale's first published address was made to the society on November 22, 1841. Neale was ordained in 1842. He was briefly incumbent of Crawley in Sussex but was forced to resign due to a chronic lung disease. The following winter he lived in the Madeira Islands, where he was able to do research for his History of the Eastern Church. In 1846 he became warden of Sackville College, an almshouse at East Grinstead, an appointment which he held until his death.

In 1854 Neale co-founded the Society of Saint Margaret, an order of women in the Church of England dedicated to nursing the sick. Many Protestants of the time were suspicious of the restoration of Anglican religious orders. In 1857, Neale was attacked and mauled at a funeral of one of the Sisters. Crowds threatened to stone him or to burn his house. He received no honour or preferment in England, and his doctorate was bestowed by Trinity College (Connecticut).

He was also the principal founder of the Anglican and Eastern Churches Association, a religious organization founded as the Anglican and Eastern Orthodox Churches Union in 1864. A result of this organisation was the Hymns of the Eastern Church, edited by John Mason Neale and published in 1865.

Neale was strongly high church in his sympathies, and had to endure a good deal of opposition, including a fourteen years' inhibition by his bishop. Neale translated the Eastern liturgies into English, and wrote a mystical and devotional commentary on the Psalms. However, he is best known as a hymnwriter and, especially, translator, having enriched English hymnody with many ancient and mediaeval hymns translated from Latin and Greek. For example, the melody of Good King Wenceslas originates from a medieval Latin springtime poem, Tempus adest floridum. More than anyone else, he made English-speaking congregations aware of the centuries-old tradition of Latin, Greek, Russian, and Syrian hymns. The 1875 edition of the Hymns Ancient and Modern contains 58 of his translated hymns; The English Hymnal (1906) contains 63 of his translated hymns and six original hymns by Neale.

His translations include:

- "All Glory, Laud and Honour"
- "A Great and Mighty Wonder"
- "O Blest Creator of the Light"
- "O come, O come, Emmanuel"
- "Of the Father's Heart Begotten"
- "Sing, My Tongue, the Glorious Battle"
- "To Thee Before the Close of Day"
- "Ye Sons and Daughters of the King"
- "Brief life is here our portion"
- "To thee, O dear, dear country"
- "Jerusalem the Golden"

The last three are included in the poem of Bernard of Cluny, De Contemptu Mundi, translated by him in full.

== Death and legacy ==
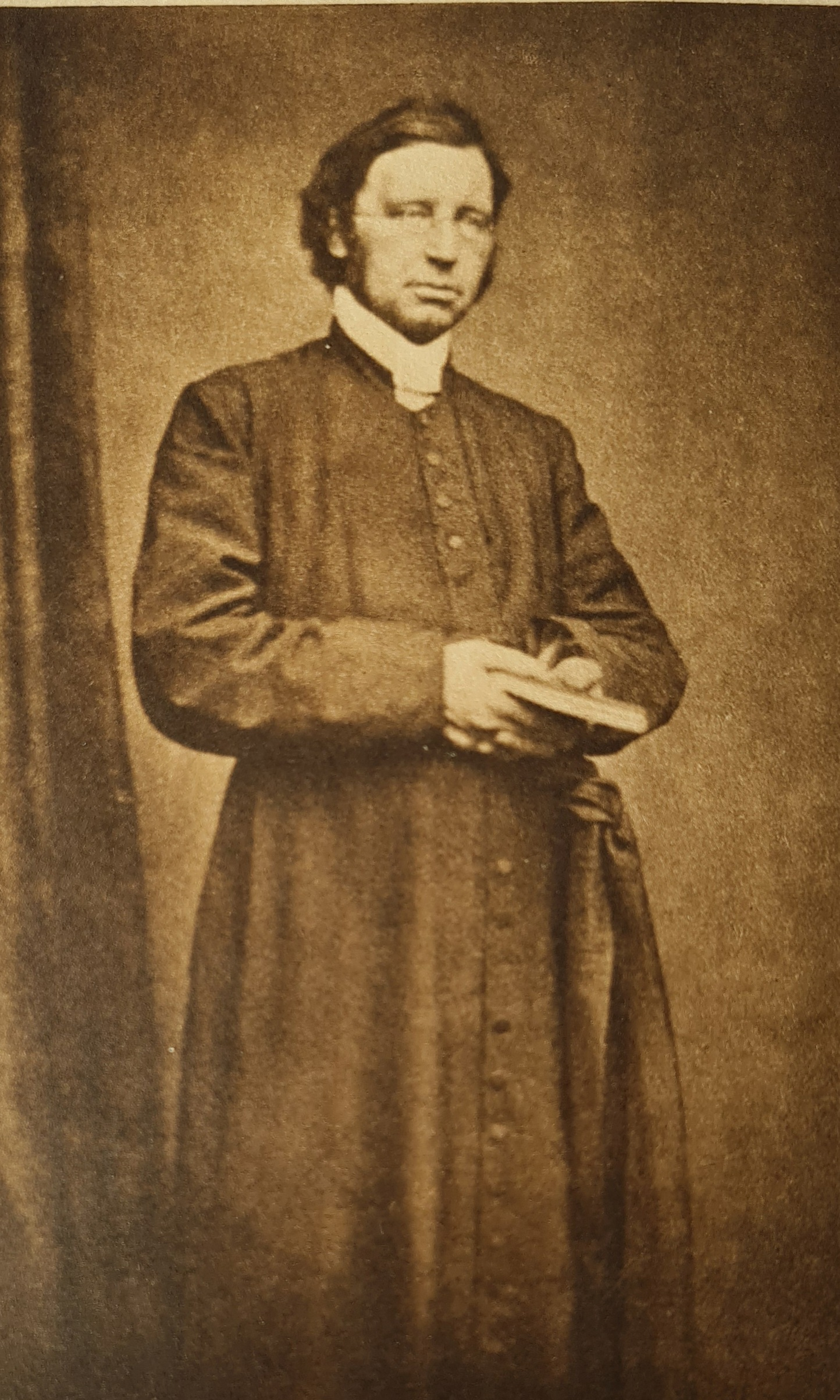
Portrait of John Mason Neale standing, from John Mason Neale letters 1910

Since Neale died on 6 August 1866, the Feast of the Transfiguration, he is commemorated by the Anglican churches on the following day, 7 August. Neale is honoured in the Church of England and in the Episcopal Church that day.

Neale and Catherine Winkworth are commemorated together in the Calendar of Saints of the Evangelical Lutheran Church in America on 1 July, the anniversary of Winkworth's death. Neale was buried in St Swithun's churchyard, East Grinstead.

== Works ==
Sermons

- Sermons for the Black Letter Days (1868)
- Sermons for Children (1869)
- Sermons Preached in a Religious House (1869), volume one
- Sermons on the Blessed Sacrament (1870)
- Sermons on the Passages of the Psalms (1871)
- Three Groups of Sermons (1871)
- Occasional Sermons (1873)
- Sermons for the Church Year (1876) volume one
- Sermons Preached in Sackville College Chapel (1895)
  - Vol. IV. Minor Festivals of the Church of England
- Sermons on Passages from the Prophets (1895), volume one

Hymns and carols

Neale's most enduring and widely known legacy is probably his contribution to the Christmas repertoire, most notably:

- Good Christian Men, Rejoice, Christmas carol
- Good King Wenceslas, his original legendary Boxing Day carol
- O come, O come, Emmanuel, Advent hymn translated from the "O Antiphons" for the week preceding Christmas

John Mason Neale also wrote the hymn:

- A Great and Mighty Wonder, translated from the Greek of St Germanus, although Neale incorrectly attributed it to St Anatolius.

Hymn-books

- Hymni ecclesiae e breviariis: quibusdam et missalibus gallicanis, germanis, hispanis, lusitanis (1851)
- Hymnal Noted (Novello, Ewer and Company, 1851)
- Accompanying Harmonies to The Hymnal Noted by John Mason Neale and Thomas Helmore, published under the sanction of the Ecclesiological society by Novello, Ewer (1852)
- Sequentiae ex missalibus : Germanicis, Anglicis, Gallicis, Aliisque medii aevi, collectae (1852)
- Mediaeval Hymns and Sequences, compiled by John Mason Neale, first edition 1851
- Seatonian poems (1864)
- Hymns of the Eastern Church, translated with Notes and an Introduction 1870 edition compiled by John Mason Neale

Theological and historical books

- A History of the Holy Eastern Church (1847)
- An Introduction to the History of the Holy Eastern Church (1850, 2 vols)
- A short commentary on the Hymnal noted; from ancient sources (1852)
- The Bible, and the Bible only, the religion of protestants, a lecture (1852)
- The ancient liturgies of the Gallican Church: now first collected, with an introductory dissertation, notes, and various readings, together with parallel passages from the Roman, Ambrosian, and Mozarabic rites (1855)
- Mediæval preachers and mediæval preaching (1856)
- A history of the so-called Jansenist church of Holland; with a sketch of its earlier annals, and some account of the Brothers of the common life (1858)
- Voices from the East, documents on the present state and working of the Oriental Church (1859)
- Essays on Liturgiology and Church History (1863)
- A commentary on the Psalms by John Mason Neale and Richard Frederick Littledale (1868)
- A History of the Holy Eastern Church (1873)
- A Commentary on the Psalms: From Primitive and Mediaeval Writers by John Mason Neale and Richard Frederick Littledale (1874)

Books related to Cambridge Camden Society

- The history of pews: a paper read before the Cambridge Camden Society on Monday, November 22, 1841: with an appendix containing a report presented to the Society on the statistics of pews, on Monday, December 7, 1841 (1841)
- A few words to churchwardens on churches and church ornaments (1842)
- The symbolism of churches and church ornaments: a translation of the first book of the Rationale divinorum officiorum (1843) by John Mason Neale and Benjamin Webb

Novels

- Stories of the Crusades (1846)
- Theodora Phranza; or, the Fall of Constantinople (1857)

Poetry

- Edom: A Seatonian Poem (1849)
- Sinai: A Seatonian Prize Poem (1857)
- Ruth: A Seatonian Poem (1860)
- Seatonian Poems (1864)

== Sources ==
- John Mason Neale, DD: A Memoir (1907), Eleanor Towle
- Memoir by his friend, Richard Frederick Littledale
- Letters of John Mason Neale (1910), selected and edited by Eleanor Towle
- "Neale, John Mason" . Dictionary of National Biography. London: Smith, Elder & Co. 1885–1900. Has a complete list of Neale's works
- "J. M. Neale (Neale, J. M. (John Mason), 1818-1866)". The Online Books Page.
