= Quicumque Christum Quæritis =

Quicumque Christum Quæritis is the opening line of the twelfth (in honour of the Epiphany) and last poem in the "Cathemerinon" of Prudentius. This twelfth poem or hymn contains 52 iambic dimeter strophes, and an irregular selection from its 208 lines has furnished four hymns to the Roman Breviary, all of which conclude with the usual Marian doxology ("Jesu tibi sit gloria" etc., not composed by Prudentius), slightly varied to make the doxology appropriate for the several feasts employing the hymns. The four centos are:

- (1) Quicumque Christum quæritis
- (2) O sola magnarum urbium
- (3) Audit tyrannus anxius
- (4) Salvete flores martyrum
