= St Peter's, London Docks =

Coordinates: 51°30′22″N 0°03′29″W

St Peter's London Docks
- Church of St Peter's London Docks
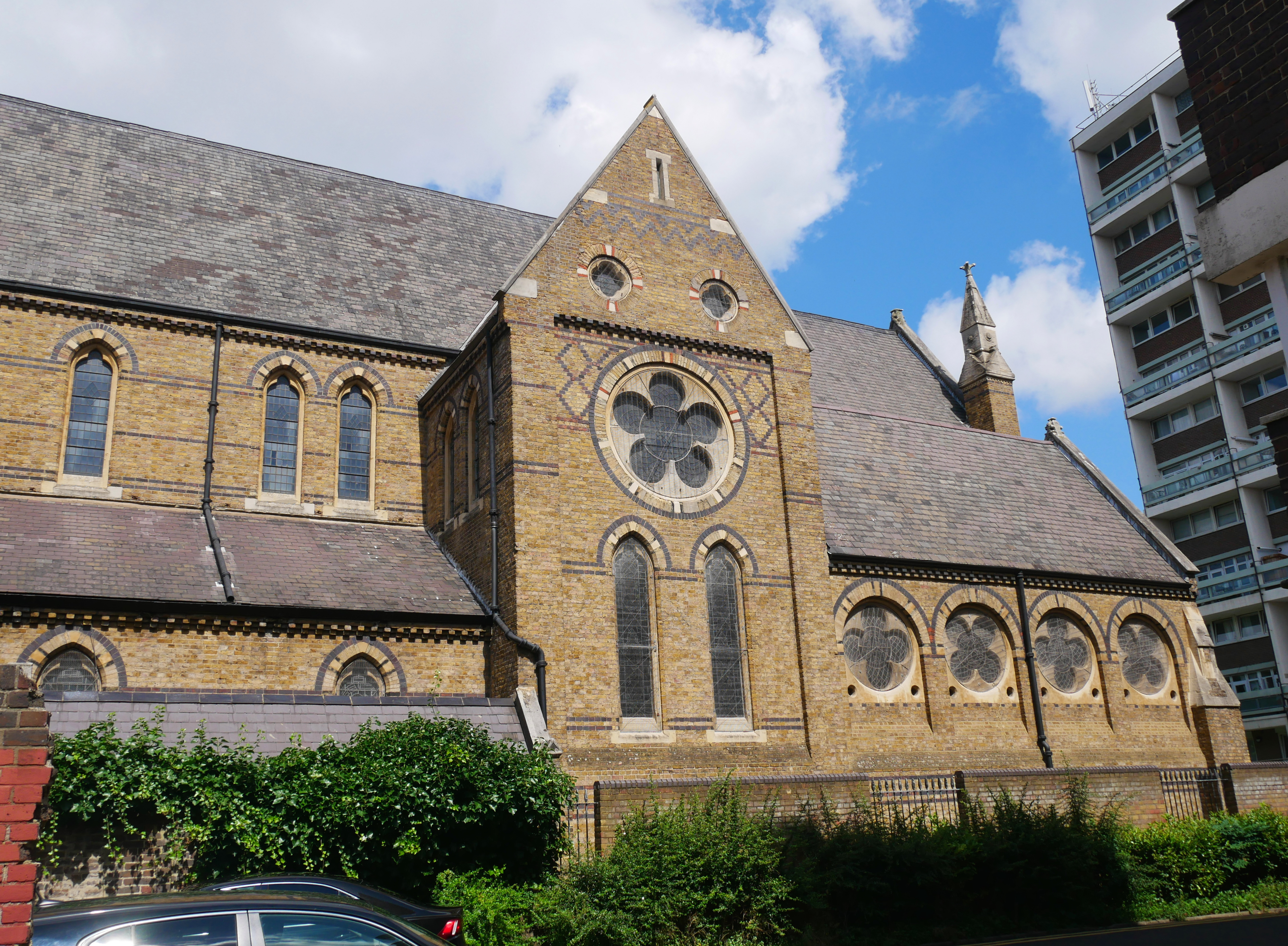
- The south face of the church
- St Peter's London Docks
- Country: England
- Denomination: Church of England
- Churchmanship: Traditional Anglo-Catholic
- Website: Official website

History
- Founded: 1856
- Founder: Charles Lowder

Architecture
- Architect: F. H. Pownall
- Years built: 1866

Administration
- Division: Tower Hamlets
- Diocese: London

Clergy
- Bishop: Rt Revd Jonathan Baker (AEO)
- Rector: Father Jonathan Beswick SSC (designate)

St Peter's, Wapping, is a Grade I listed Anglican church in Wapping Lane, Wapping, London, E1W 2RW.

It was built in 1865–1939, designed by F. H. Pownall. The organist Thomas Worsley Staniforth composed the hymn tune Jerusalem my happy home to celebrate the laying of the foundation stone.

The church was the first Anglican mission to the poor of London. Work was begun in 1856 by the Revd Charles Lowder MA and a group of priests, all were members of the Society of the Holy Cross. The Society had been founded a year earlier with the express purpose of banding priests to a common rule of life and prayer in mission service.

Wapping was one of the poorest districts in London, a haunt of prostitutes and petty criminals, living alongside those who earned a precarious living from the docks.

Lowder's work began in Lower Well Alley (now the park by the James Orwell sports centre) and moved to an iron church in Calvert Street (now Tench Street). Lowder's group of Clergy and Sisters provided practical care through schools, clubs, cheap canteens and child care and spiritual care through a wide range of services, centred on the Mass at the Mission Churches.

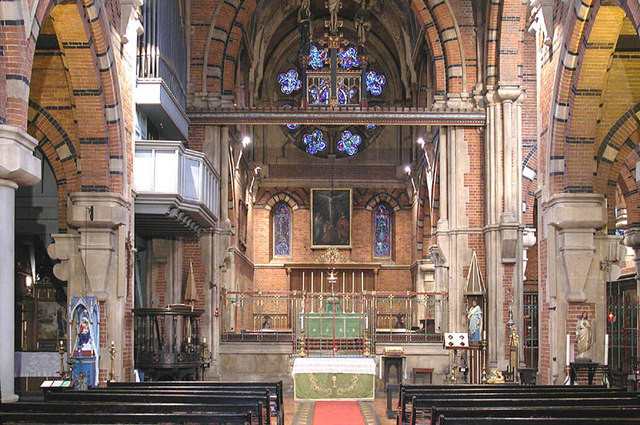
Interior

In 1866 the new Church of St Peter was consecrated. Soon afterwards cholera struck the East End. Lowder organised Sisters of Mercy and others to care for the sick and raised funds for a tented hospital. The Priests and Sisters took great risks and worked without stint for the people of Wapping. At the end of the cholera outbreak, people were calling Lowder ‘the Father’ because he seemed like the father of the whole community.

After Lowder's death in 1880, Maurice Bingham Adams was engaged to design extensions in his memory. In 1884-94 a mortuary, chapel and baptistry were all added.

Further work was done to the church in the 1930s, and finished in 1940, only to be immediately destroyed by a bomb in the Blitz. Repairs were completed in 1949. The church was completely renovated in 1985.

The Mass on Sunday is at 9.15am (said) and 10.30am (sung). The Church has a regular Thursday attendance from St Peter's, London Docks Church of England Primary School, founded in 1856 the same time as the Church was built as a part of the Mission in Wapping.
