= John Mason Good =

English writer (1764–1827)

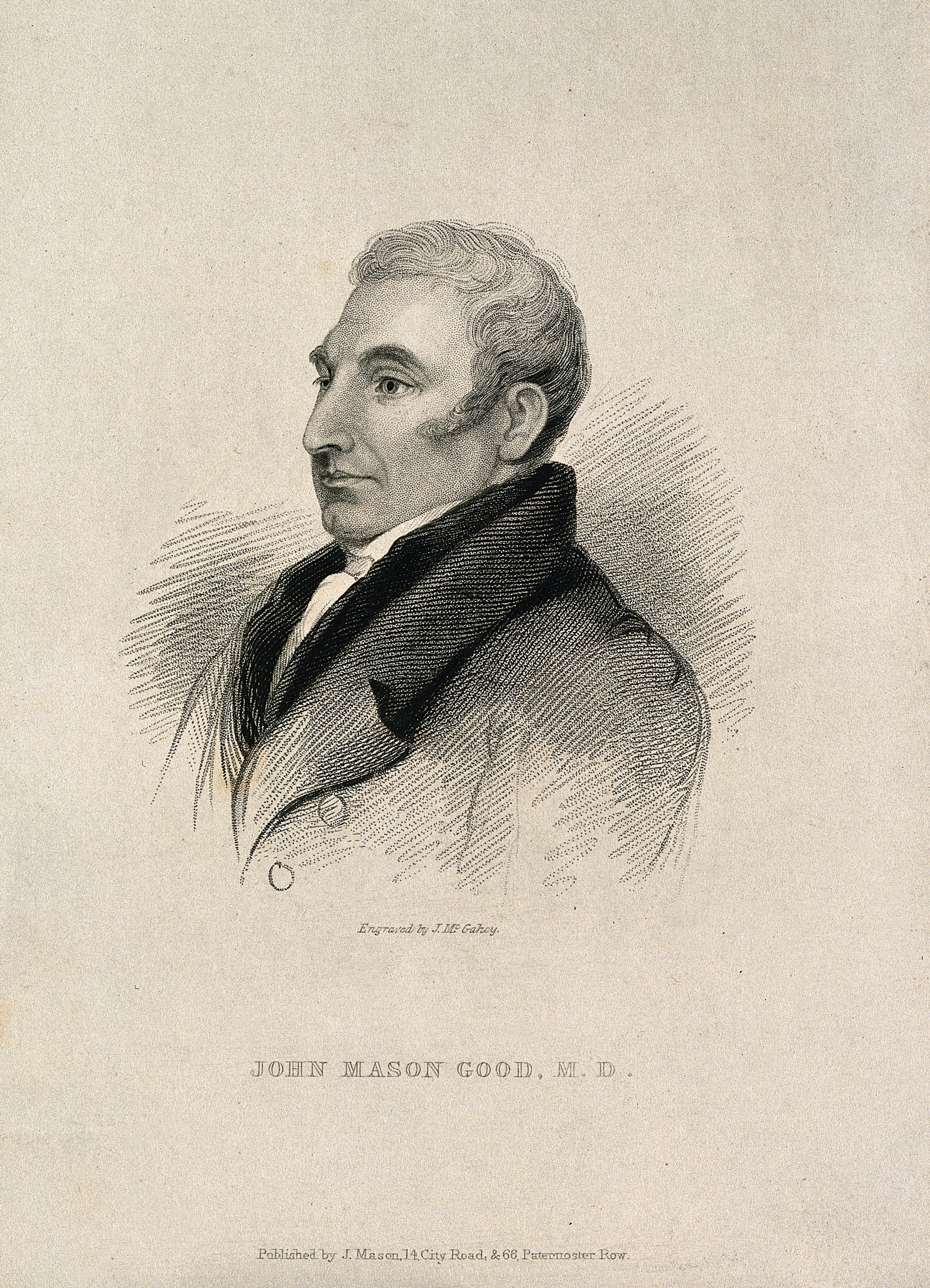
Stipple engraving by J. McGahey after Rev. W. Russell

John Mason Good (25 May 1764 – 2 January 1827) was an English writer on medical, religious and classical subjects, born in Epping, Essex.

John Good's parents were the Nonconformist minister Revd Peter Good and Sarah Good, the daughter of another Nonconformist minister, Revd Henry Peyto of Great Coggeshall. John Mason Good was named after the Puritan clergyman and hymn writer John Mason (1645–1694), of whom his mother Sarah was a descendant.

Good attended a school at Romsey kept by his father. At about the age of 15 John Good was apprenticed to a surgeon-apothecary at Gosport. In 1783 he went to London to practise his medical studies. In the autumn of 1784, he began to practise as a surgeon at Sudbury in Suffolk. There he was an acquaintance of Nathan Drake, a fellow writer and student of Shakespeare.

In 1793 Good removed to London, where he entered into partnership with a surgeon and apothecary. But the partnership was soon dissolved, and to increase his income, he began to devote attention to literary pursuits. Besides contributing both in prose and verse to the Analytical and Critical Reviews and the British and Monthly Magazines, and other periodicals, he wrote a large number of works relating chiefly to medical and religious subjects.

In 1794 John Good became a member of the British Pharmaceutical Society, and in that connection, and especially by the publication of his work, A History of Medicine (1795), he did much to effect a greatly needed reform in the profession of the apothecary. In 1795 the London Medical Society awarded him their Fothergillian gold medal. In 1820, he took the diploma of M.D. at Marischal College, University of Aberdeen.

Good was not only well versed in classical literature, but was acquainted with the principal European languages, and also with Persian, Arabic and Hebrew. His prose works display wide erudition, but their style is dull and tedious. His poetry, such as his verse paraphrase of the Song of Songs, never rises above pleasant and well-versified commonplace. His translation of Lucretius, The Nature of Things (1805–1807), contains elaborate philological and explanatory notes, together with parallel passages and quotations from European and Asiatic authors.

== Family ==
Good married firstly, Mary Godfrey at Coggeshall, Essex on 31 May 1785. Then secondly, Susanna Fenn at Sudbury, Suffolk on 12 June 1788. He died at Shepperton, Middlesex, on 2 January 1827 and was interred in the crypt of St Pancras New Church alongside his son John Mason (d.1803) and afterwards, his wife Susanna (c.1771 – 1834).

== See also ==
- John Mason Neale, namesake
