= John Mason (poet) =

Calvinistic Anglican priest, poet, and hymn-writer

John Mason (1646?–1694) was a Calvinistic Anglican priest, poet and hymn-writer.

== Life ==
He belonged to a clerical family living in the neighbourhood of Kettering and Wellingborough, Northamptonshire. He was educated first at Strixton in Northamptonshire, and was admitted a sizar of Clare Hall, Cambridge, on 16 May 1661, graduated B.A. in 1664, and M.A. in 1668. After acting as curate at Isham in Northamptonshire, he was presented on 21 October 1668 to become vicar of the village of Stantonbury in Buckinghamshire (then virtually deserted, having no vicarage, and he may really have been chaplain to Sir John Wittewronge); he left for the rectory of Water Stratford in the same county on 28 January 1674, presented by Viscountess Baltinglass, the daughter by his first marriage of Sir Peter Temple, 2nd Baronet.

Under the influence of James Wrexham, a puritan preacher at Haversham, formerly vicar of Kimble Magna and of Woburn, Mason's thoughts turned to the prospect of the millennium, and he constantly suffered from pains in the head. He was sensitive to noise, and retired to an empty house, where even the sound of his own footsteps and his low voice when he prayed caused him pain. He was liable to vivid and terrifying dreams, and subject to visual hallucination. His wife died in February 1687; in 1690 he preached a sermon on the parable of the ten virgins, an attempt to interpret apocalyptic passages of scripture in the light of recent events. This sermon, repeated in other places, made some stir, and was published in the following year. About the same time, he ceased to administer the sacrament in his church, and preached on no other subject besides the personal reign of Christ on earth, which Mason announced was about to begin in Water Stratford. His teaching attracted some believers, to whom he expounded an extreme form of predestination doctrine. An encampment of his followers was formed on the plot of ground south of the village, called the "Holy Ground", where a rough life in common was lived. Noisy meetings took place in barns and cottages, and dancing and singing was kept up day and night in the parsonage.

Mason described to a crowd from a window in his house on Sunday, 22 April 1694, a vision of the Saviour, which he had experienced, he said, on Easter Monday, 16 April. From that time he used no more prayers, with the exception of the last clause of the Lord's Prayer, but announced that his work was accomplished, as the reign on earth had already begun. He died of a quinsy in the following month, and was buried in the church of Water Stratford on 22 May 1694. The belief in the coming millennium, and in the immortality of their prophet, was firmly rooted in the minds of his followers; and some refused to credit his death. The succeeding rector, Isaac Rushworth, had the body exhumed, and exhibited to the crowd, but many remained unconvinced, and had finally to be ejected from the 'Holy Ground.' Meetings in a house in the village continued for sixteen years afterwards.

== Works ==
Mason was one of the earliest writers of hymns (instead of metrical psalms) used in congregational worship, influenced in style by George Herbert. Some of his lines were known to Alexander Pope and John Wesley, and Isaac Watts borrowed freely from them. Mason wrote more than 30 hymns, several of which are found in early 18th-century collections, and some of which were later adapted. Ralph Vaughan Williams adapted an English folk tune for Mason's How shall I sing that majesty for the English Hymnal, and in this form Mason's hymn remains in use in Anglican church music, though now usually sung to the modern tune Coe Fen.

His published works include:

- Funeral Sermon for Mrs. Clare Wittewronge, London, 1671.
- Spiritual Songs, or Songs of Praise, London, 1683, 1685 (with a sacred poem on Dives and Lazarus), 1692, 1701, 1704 (8th edit.), 1708 (10th edit.), 1718 (11th edit.), 1725, 1750 (14th edit.); Booking, 1760 (?); London, 1760 (15th edit.); London, 1761 (16th edit.), 1859. All editions but the last published anonymously. The later issues contain also Penitential Cries, by T. Shepherd of Braintree.
- The Midnight Cry. Sermon on the Parable of the Ten Virgins, London, 1691, 1692, 1694 (5th edit.)
- Remains, in Two Sermons, published by T. Shepherd, London, 1698.
- Select Remains, published by his grandson, John Mason, with a recommendation by Isaac Watts, London, 1741, 1742; Boston, 1743; London, 1745, 1767 (5th edit.), 1790; Bridlington, 1791; Salem, 1799; Booking, 1801 (9th edit.); Leeds, 1804 (12th edit.); London, 1808 (18th edit.), 1812; Wellington, Shropshire, 1822; Scarborough, 1828; London, 1830.
- A Little Catechism, with Little Verses and Little Sayings, for Little Children, London, which had reached an eighth edition in 1755.

== Family ==
The parish register of Water Stratford records the baptisms of four sons and one daughter of John Mason and Mary his wife between 1677 and 1684. John (born 1677) became a dissenting minister at Daventry, Northamptonshire, at Dunmow, Essex, and at Spaldwick, Huntingdonshire, successively. He died at Spaldwick in 1723, and was father of clergyman John Mason (1706–63). William (born October 1681) was B.A. of King's College, Cambridge, in 1704, instituted to the vicarage of Mentmore-with-Ledburn, Buckinghamshire, on 23 December 1706, and was also rector of Bonsall, Derbyshire, 1736–39. He died on 29 March 1744, and was buried at Mentmore. An eldest daughter, Martha, was born at Stantonbury. The Victorian clergyman and hymn-writer John Mason Neale (1818–66) was a distant descendant and was named after his forefather.
