= F. H. Pownall =

Frederick Hyde Pownall (22 August 1831 – 1907) was a British architect. He was County Surveyor for Middlesex for about 45 years, and designed both Anglican and Roman Catholic churches.

== Life ==
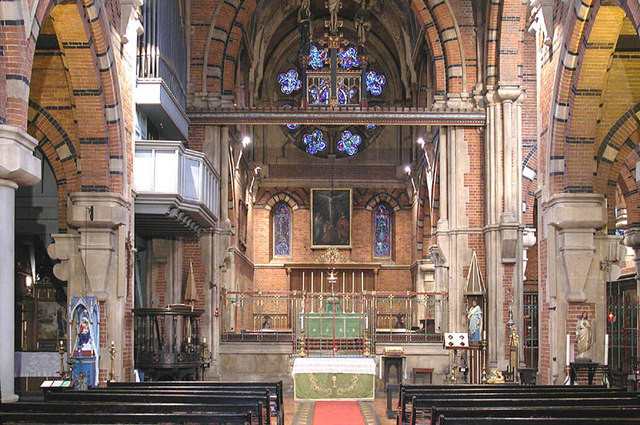
Interior of St Peter's, London Docks.

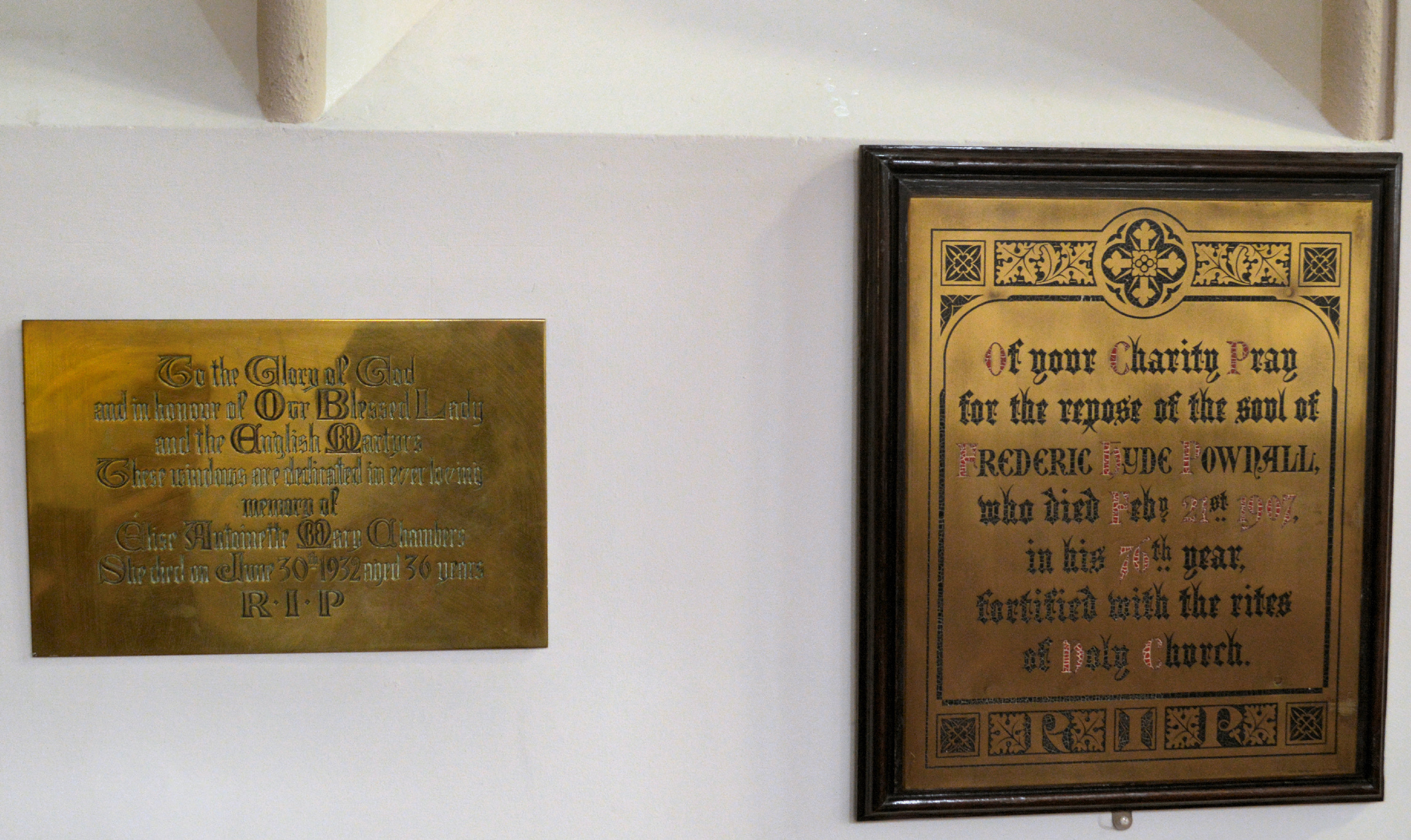
Memorial, Church of St James, Twickenham

He was the son of John George Henry Pownall (1792–1880), a magistrate, landed proprietor and philanthropist, and his wife Amelia Sophia Pownall (née Waterhouse). He was educated at Stanmore and Rugby, before being articled to the architect Samuel Daukes.

He was the County Surveyor for Middlesex, for about 45 years, first under the Justices of the Peace and then, from 1888, under the newly established County Council. He designed the neo-Tudor Middlesex Guildhall built in Parliament Square in 1893, This was later demolished to make way for the present building of 1912–13 by J. S. Gibson, now housing the Supreme Court.

Pownall was also responsible for alterations to the Sessions House, Clerkenwell, the rebuilding of Coldbath Fields Prison, and the erection of Banstead Lunatic Asylum. Amongst the churches he designed were St Peter's, London Docks, Corpus Christi, Maiden Lane, Covent Garden and Sacred Heart Church and School, Holloway, all in London, and St Dunstan's at Cheam.

He retired from his appointments and private practice in 1898, and moved to Twickenham, where he lived until his death.

Pownall is recorded as having converted to Roman Catholicism at some time before 1885.

He exhibited six works the Royal Academy between 1852 and 1867.

== Family ==
He married Jane Todd in 1856, by whom he had six sons and three daughters. Jane Pownall died in 1883 and F. H. Pownall had a son and two daughters by his second wife. His eldest son was the Very Rev. Canon Arthur Hyde Pownall (1857–1935) and a younger son, Gilbert Pownall, designed much of the mosaic work in Westminster Cathedral. His youngest son, Hubert Joseph Pownall (b. 1891), was killed in France in 1916

== Works ==
- St Mary, Carleton-in-Craven, Yorkshire (Anglican), 1858–59.
- Alterations to the Sessions House, Clerkenwell, 1860. Pownall refaced three sides of the building, previously bare brick, with Portland stone.
- St Philip and St James, Whitton, Twickenham (Anglican), 1862.
- Expansion of Coldbath Fields Prison, in two phases between 1863 and 1870. Closed in 1885 and demolished.
- St John Evangelist, Cononley, Yorkshire (Anglican) 1864.
- St Dunstan's Church, Cheam, consecrated November 1864.
- St Peter's, London Docks (Anglican), consecrated 1866.
- Sacred Heart Convent, Hove, 1870–72; now Cardinal Newman Catholic School.
- Sacred Heart Church and School, Holloway, London (Roman Catholic) 1870.
- Corpus Christi Church, Maiden Lane, Covent Garden (Roman Catholic), 1873–74.
- Most Holy Trinity Monastery, Notting Hill, St. Charles Square (carmelite monastery), 1877–1878.
- Church and school of St Thomas of Canterbury at Grays, Essex (Roman Catholic), 1886.
- Middlesex Guildhall, Parliament Square, London, 1893; demolished.
- Banstead Lunatic Asylum, 1877; demolished.

== Sources ==
- Antram, Nicholas; Pevsner, Nikolaus (2013). Sussex: East with Brighton and Hove. The Buildings of England. London: Yale University Press. ISBN 978-0-300-18473-0.
- Cherry, Bridget; Pevsner, Nikolaus (1990) [1983]. London 2: South. The Buildings of England. London: Penguin Books. ISBN 0-14-071047-7.
- Gorman, W. Gordon (1885). Converts to Rome (2nd ed.). London: W. Swan, Sonnenschein and Co.
