= Carleton-in-Craven =

Village and civil parish in North Yorkshire, England

Coordinates: 53°56′36″N 2°02′41″W

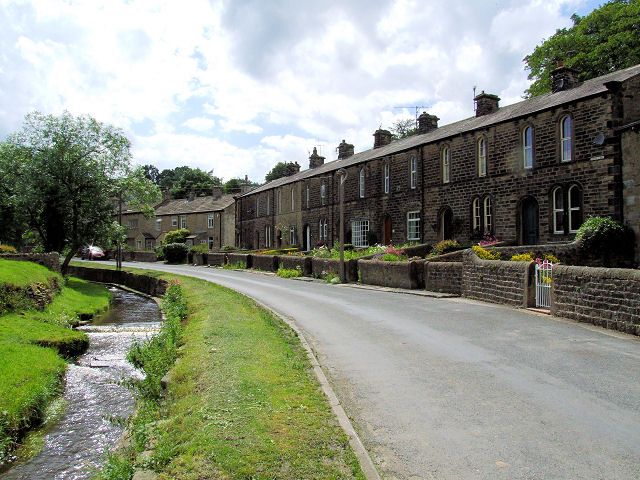
- Beck Side, Carleton-in-Craven

- Location within North Yorkshire
- Population: 1,118 (2011 census)
- OS grid reference: SD971497
  - London: 185 mi (298 km) SSE
- Civil parish: Carleton
- Unitary authority: North Yorkshire
- Ceremonial county: North Yorkshire
- Region: Yorkshire and the Humber
- Country: England
- Sovereign state: United Kingdom
- Post town: Skipton
- Postcode district: BD23
- Police: North Yorkshire
- Fire: North Yorkshire
- Ambulance: Yorkshire

Carleton-in-Craven is a small village and civil parish in the county of North Yorkshire, England, and situated just over 1.5 miles (2.4 km) south-west from the market town of Skipton.

The village had a population of 1,118 at the 2011 Census, and contains a primary school, St Mary's Church, a post office, newsagents & village store, public house, a social club, and a pharmacy.

Geographically, the village of Carleton-in-Craven is the most northern village in the South Pennines.

The name Carleton derives from the Old English ceorltūn meaning the 'settlement of the free peasants'.

The spelling of the village name, with an 'e', can be seen in a record, dated 1440, mentioning Robert Mosele, a husbandman of the village, who was accused by Robert Blakey of carrying away some of the latter's goods.

Until 1974 it was part of the West Riding of Yorkshire. From 1974 to 2023 it was part of the Craven District, it is now administered by the unitary North Yorkshire Council.

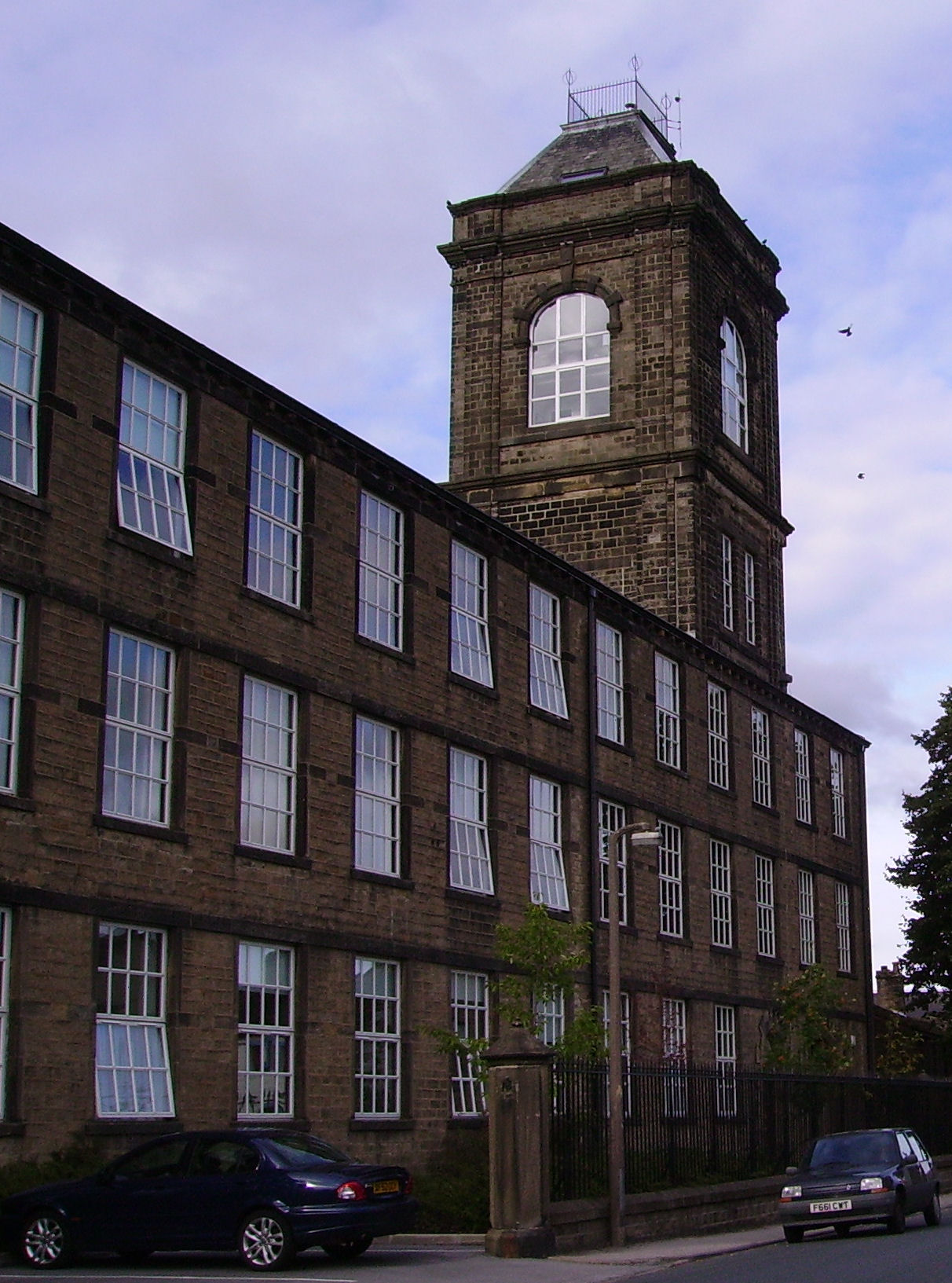
Carleton Mill

Carleton Mill dates to 1861, when it was built for spinning cotton; the mill later housed a mail-order business throughout the 1930s. During the Second World War the Rover company used the building to produce aircraft parts. Shortly after the war, the mill returned to its original use as a textile factory and later produced carpets, eventually closing in November 1999. In 2005 it was converted to luxury apartments by Novo Homes, with 51 apartments in the mill and 26 houses constructed within the grounds.

== Notable people ==
Susanna Lister, the illustrator, was born here at Carleton Hall in about 1670.

== See also ==
- Listed buildings in Carleton-in-Craven
