= Edward Wilton Eddis =

Poet and prophet in the Catholic Apostolic Church at Westminster

Edward Wilton Eddis (10 May 1825 – 18 October 1905) was a poet and prophet in the Catholic Apostolic Church at Westminster, London and co-author of the Hymns for the Use of the Churches, the hymnal of the Catholic Apostolic Church.

== Life ==
Edward Wilton Eddis was born on 10 May 1825 in Islington as the last of the five children of Eden Eddis (1784–1838) and Clementia Parker (1789–1875). His eldest brother was the portrait artist Eden Upton Eddis. The other three were: Clementia Esther Eddis (31 December 1815 – 16 December 1887), Arthur Shelly Eddis (11 January 1817 – 23 May 1893) and Henry William Eddis (30 November 1820 – 1911, Ontario). Edward Wilton Eddis married Ellen Sheppard (12 May 1829 – 5 February 1878, Berrima, New South Wales, Australia) in the late 1840s or the beginning of the 1850s and they had four children: Ellen M. Eddis (1854–1892 in Melbourne, Victoria), Wilton Clement Eddis (1855–1919), Marion Elizabeth Eddis (1862–1893 in Carlton, Victoria) and Ethel Shearman Eddis (1864 in England – 1884 in Prn Alfho, Australia). Given the places of birth of his children and the places of death of his wife, he married Ellen Sheppard before 1854 and the family must have moved to Australia in the late 1860s or the 1870s. Edward Wilton Eddis survived three of his children.

E.W. Eddis was a member of the Catholic Apostolic Church and he was appointed as a prophet by its Westminster congregation. He probably became a member of the church before 1850 as he wrote in 1851 his collection of poetry entitled The Time of the End and Other Poems, a collection that was in line with catholic apostolic church thought. Around 1860, Edward Wilton Eddis and John George Francis (?–1889) had a theological dispute with John Ross Dix when the latter published The New Apostles; or, Irvingism, its history, doctrines, and practices in 1860, an attack on the Catholic Apostolic Church.

In his activities for the Catholic and Apostolic Church Eddis edited together with John Bate Cardale the Hymns for the Use of the Churches, the first Catholic Apostolic Hymnal: (see below). After moving to Australia, Edward Wilton Eddis was one of the 11 clergy operating for the Catholic Apostolic Church in Melbourne in the 1880s and 1890s. To this group of clergy also belonged Robert Appleton, George Clark, William Hinscliff, John Kirkhope, William Miller, William Patten, R G Suter, Edward Tucker, Percy Whitestone, and William Wilson. On 18 October 1905, E.W. Eddis died in Toronto.

== Hymns for the Use of the Churches ==
A committee consisting of at least Edward Wilton Eddis (the leading member) and John Bate Cardale, Apostle for England in the Catholic Apostolic Church, compiled the first and only official hymn-book of the Catholic Apostolic Church for the use of their congregations, and published it in 1864 with the title Hymns for the Use of the Churches (London, Bosworth & Harrison).

This hymnal was intended for use in public worship of the Church and in private devotional exercises. However, the hymns with respect to the holy communion and the eucharist (part I), were to be used in the Communion exclusively. The 1864 edition contained 205 hymns, of which nineteen were his original poems, and two translations. The second edition of the Hymns for the Use of the Churches was a revised and enlarged edition with 320 hymns and 44 doxologies. It was published in 1871 (London, J. Strangeways). To this E.W. Eddis contributed forty new hymns and one translation, thus making 62 hymns by E.W. Eddis. The third edition of the Hymns for the Use of the Churches appeared in 1875 and also contains 320 hymns and 44 doxologies; it is a reprint of that of 1871 with a few verbal alterations. Most of the hymntexts were taken from other hymnals and sometimes slightly altered:

- Hymns Ancient and Modern, 1861 edition compiled by William Henry Monk
- Hymns of the Eastern Church, translated with Notes and an Introduction 1870 edition compiled by John Mason Neale
- Mediaeval Hymns and Sequences, 1862 edition compiled by John Mason Neale
- Lyra Germanica, Hymns for the Sundays and chief festivals of the Christian Year, Translated from the German, 1855 edition compiled by Catherine Winkworth
- Hymns from the Land of Luther, 1854 edition compiled by Jane Laurie Borthwick
- Lyra Anglicana, Hymns and Sacred Songs, 1879 edition compiled by Robert Hall Baynes
- Hymns and Lyrics for the Seasons and Saints’ Days of the Church written by Gerard Moultrie (1867)
- the People's Hymnal (Richard Frederick Littledale and James Edward Vaux
- Lyra Eucharistica: Hymns and Verses on the Holy Communion, Ancient and Modern with other Poems, 1864 edition compiled by Orby Shipley
- Holy year; or, Hymns for Sundays and Holidays throughout the Year and for other Occasions, 1863 edition compiled by Christopher Wordsworth

And some hymns were provided by:

- William Hiley Bathurst
- Horatius Bonar
- John William Hewett
- John Keble (leader of the Oxford Movement)
- John Henry Newman (leader of the Oxford Movement)
- Laurence Tuttiett

Compared to the Hymns Ancient and Modern, which first appeared in 1861, a comparable set of hymn-books and individual hymns was used to compile the Hymns for the Use of the Churches. A difference lays in the alterations towards premillennialism and the contribution of original hymns phrasing catholic apostolic thought, mainly provided by Edward Wilton Eddis. Four of Eddis' hymns were taken from The Time of The End, And Other Poems (1851) and appeared in the Hymns for the Use of the Churches in an abbreviated and/or altered form:

- Thou givest us the Bread of Life
- Tis not by power or might
- Thou know’st our sorrows
- It is not yet the glory-day

Only some of Eddis' hymns are found in other hymnbooks such as O brightness of the Immortal Father's Face (translation from Greek), In us the hope of glory and Thou Standest at the Altar Besides Edward Wilton Eddis, also other writers provided hymn texts. Some of them only appended their initials to their newly written hymns and translations, as they declined to give their name to the public. The initials of those contributors were: C., C.E., C.E.E., E., E.E., E.H., E.S., E.O., F.R., F.F., F.W., H., J.E.L., L., L.E.L., L.W., M.E.A., M.S., R.F.L. and S.A. For some it is known to which persons these initials correspond:

- E.E.: Ellen Eddis-Shepherd, E.W. Eddis' wife
- E.H.: Eliza Heath (1830–1905), probably member of the Catholic Apostolic Church as she was the sister of Edward Heath (1845–1929), apostles' coadjutor, and Herbert Heath (1849–1932), angel in the Catholic Apostolic Church
- E., C.E. and C.E.E. seem to indicate members of his family; given the initials C.E. and C.E.E. probably refer to Clementia Esther Eddis
- E.O.: Edward Osler?; Edward Osler contributed another hymn
- F.F.: Frances Freer (1801–1901), member of the Catholic Apostolic Church
- J.E.L.: Jane Eliza Leeson (1808–1881), member of the Catholic Church later in life. For many years, she was active in the Catholic Apostolic Church and she contributed nine hymns and translations to the Hymns for the Use of the Churches.
- L.: Richard Frederick Littledale (1833–1890)
- L.E.L.: Letitia Elizabeth Landon
- R.F.L.: Richard Frederick Littledale (1833–1890), a close friend to John Mason Neale

The Hymns for the Use of the Churches contained a series of hymns translated from Greek and Latin. As such, this was a custom that was practiced in the Oxford Movement as well. From John Mason Neale, who was affected by the Oxford Movement, 16 translations were included in the second edition of the Hymns for the Use of the Churches. Much Catholic Apostolic teaching reflects the revival of catholic tradition within the Anglican Church, largely initiated by the parallel Oxford Movement, though it is difficult to determine the precise extent of direct influence of one upon the other – Columba Graham Flegg suggests that this was slighter than often supposed.

The Hymns for the Use of the Churches, however, only provided hymntexts, no music. In 1872, Edmund Hart Turpin, organist of the central church on Gordon Square, helped to bridge this gap by publishing the Hymn Tunes. For each of the 320 hymns in the 1871 edition of the Hymns for the Use of the Churches it contains a tune without the lyrics. Furthermore, it provides four metrical chants, one of which was written by Edmund Hart Turpin. Most of the hymn tunes were taken from other hymnbooks such as the Hymns Ancient and Modern. In total 39 tunes were newly written by Edmund Hart Turpin. The musical style of the Hymn Tunes is comparable to that of the Hymns Ancient and Modern, the famous hymnal which resulted out of the Oxford Movement in 1861. A comparison of the Hymn tunes with the Hymns for the Use of the Churches shows that most of these new tunes were to support the hymns of Edward Wilton Eddis.

== Books ==
- The Time of The End, And Other Poems (1851)
- The True Revival of the Church of Christ, and her hope in the last days. A letter, addressed to a Clergyman, with reference to a book entitled "The New Apostles", Bosworth & Harrison (1860)
- Hymns for the Use of the Churches: first edition in 1864 published by Bosworth & Harrison in London, second edition published in 1871 by J. Strangeways in London, third edition published by Chiswick Press, London in 1875, fourth edition published by T. Bosworth in 1883, a fifth edition in 1884, the 9th edition in 1898 and the 17th edition by Chiswick Press in 1900. The edition of 1900 was numbered differently than the earlier editions.
- The Log of Yorkshire: a narrative poem, covering the voyage from England to Australia of the Yorkshire from 4 December 1873 to 23 February 1874 (1874)

== Hymns and translations ==
In the second edition of the Hymns for the Use of the Churches (1871) as well as the third edition of 1875, the following hymns and translations of E.W. Eddis were published:

Hymns

- Almighty Father, let Thy love (1863)
- Angel of God, true Numberer, great High Priest (1868)
- Be present, O our Saviour, in this shrine (1864)
- Blessed are they that wait for Him (1851)
- Come, ever-blessed Lord: Thy hand is sealing (1868)
- Eye hath not seen Thy glory; Thou alone (1868)
- Father of lights, Almighty! Thine alone (1868)
- Father, Thy Holy Name be blest (1851)
- First-born of all creation (1868)
- First must Thy Name be 'Jesus' (1863)
- Fountain of life and honour, oh! Inspire (1868)
- From Thine eternal temple (1868)
- Grant unto us, O Lamb of God, to be (1863)
- High Priest of God, whose blessing (1868)
- In Us the Hope of Glory (1863)
- It is nog yet the glory-day (1851)
- Jesu! Eternal Shepherd, by Thy rod (1868)
- Jeus, our Prince and Saviour (1868)
- Lord Jesu Christ, Thou standest (1868)
- Lord of the bounteous harvest! (1863)
- O fill us, Lord of life and love (1868)
- O God of God, our Saviour (1868)
- O Infinite Creator (1868)
- O Jesu! Rock of Zion (1863)
- O King of peace, who standest (1868)
- O merciful High Priest! Thine almond rod (1868)
- O merciful Redeemer, Thou hast worn (1868)
- O Saviour, Thine elect and early sheaf (1868)
- O Saviour! Though the darkness (1868)
- Once from the throne Thou camest forth (1868)
- Our sins, our sorrows, Lord, were laid on Thee (1863)
- Shepherd of Israel, still dost Thou abide (1863)
- Six month with myrrh for cleansing (1863)
- Spirit of Christ, Thou speakest (1868)
- Still in the days of famine (1865)
- Still in Thy quiet garden (1868)
- Strangers and pilgrims, O ascended Lord (1868)
- Suffer the little ones to come (1851)
- The doors are shut: from earthly fear and strife (1868)
- The Dove from heaven went forth alone (1868)
- The Lamb is slain! And on the holy door (1868)
- The silent veil was o’er Thee: thirty years (1868)
- The voices of the morning! (1868)
- There is a fire in Zion (1863)
- Thine angels sang rejoicing at Thy birth (1868)
- Thine is the living shield, the sword of light (1871)
- Thine is the vein for silver (1868)
- Thou givest us the Bread of Life (1849)
- Thou in Thy holy mountain (1868)
- Thou know’st our sorrows (1851)
- Thou Standest at the Altar (1863)
- Thou wast the Morning Lamb, Lord Jesu Christ (1863)
- Thou wentest forth with weeping (1868)
- Thy grave, Almighty Father (1869)
- Thy hand alone can write (1868)
- Thy throne is set in heaven (1863)
- Thye work was sorrow: Thou hast borne alone (1868)
- Tis not by power or might (1863)
- Write Thy Father’s Name upon us (1863)

Translations

- O Blest Creator of the stars (1863): translation of Creator alme siderum
- O brightness of the Immortal Father's Face (translation from Greek)
- O holy, holy, Feast of life Divine (1869): translation of O sacrum, sacrum convivium
