= Saint Paul Lutheran Community of Faith =

Historic church in Colorado, United States

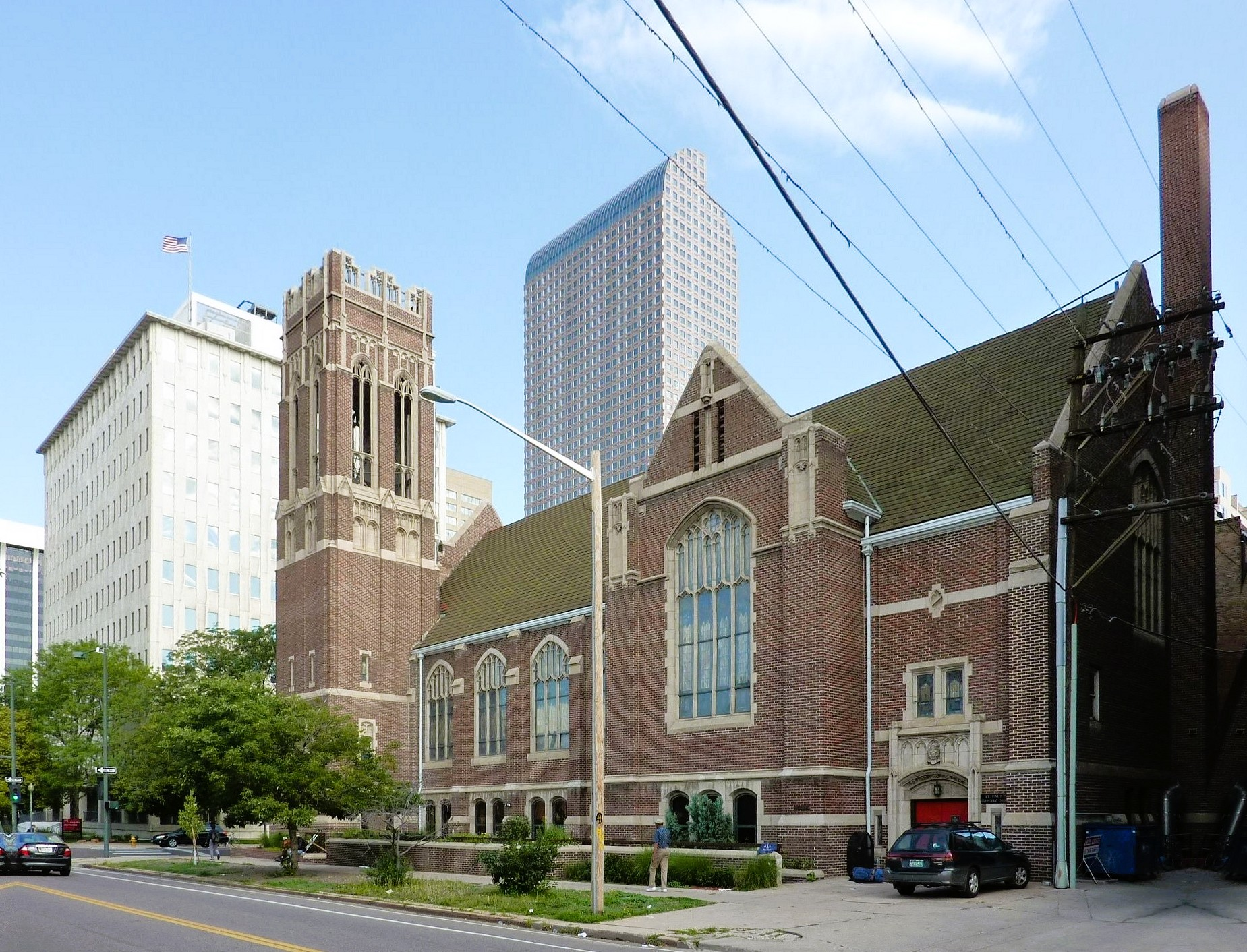
- Saint Paul Lutheran Community of Faith
- Country: United States
- Denomination: Evangelical Lutheran Church
- Website: http://saintpauldenver.com/

History
- Former name: St. Paul's English Evangelical Lutheran Church
- Status: Church

Architecture
- Functional status: Active
- Style: Gothic
- St. Paul's English Evangelical Lutheran Church
- U.S. National Register of Historic Places
- Colorado State Register of Historic Properties
- Location within Colorado Location within the United States
- Location: 1600 Grant St., Denver, Colorado
- Coordinates: 39°44′31″N 104°58′58″W
- Area: 0.2 acres (0.081 ha)
- Architect: multiple
- Architectural style: Late Gothic Revival
- NRHP reference No.: 97001191
- CSRHP No.: 5DV.2687
- Added to NRHP: September 30, 1997

The Saint Paul Lutheran Community of Faith, formerly known as St. Paul's English Evangelical Lutheran Church, is a historic church at 1600 Grant Street in Denver, Colorado, United States. It was built in a Gothic Revival style and was added to the National Register of Historic Places in 1997. It is currently home to Fellow Citizens Church.

From 2003 to 2019 the Lutheran community, a member of the Evangelical Lutheran Church in America (ELCA), shared the Christian life and mission with a community of independent Catholics and was known as a "Lutheran and Roman Catholic" community of faith. In 2018, the Lutheran bishop challenged the Catholic members of the community about their lack of affiliation with an episcopal jurisdiction, which led them to an examination of the theology and praxis of the Ecumenical Catholic Communion (ECC) and subsequently to the decision to request acceptance as an ECC community in 2018. The new interjurisdictional collaboration, St. Paul Lutheran and Catholic Community of Faith, as a single community worshiping in two faith traditions served as an inspiration to both ELCA Bishop Jim Gonia and ECC Presiding Bishop Francis Krebs, who both saw the congregation as a model of ecumenical unity "from the ground up". Their dialogues, with input from the ELCA’s Chief Ecumenical Officer, led to the historic 2019 "Considerations for Collaboration in Mission and Sharing in Worship between Congregations of the Rocky Mountain Synod of the Evangelical Lutheran Church in America and Congregations of the Ecumenical Catholic Communion in this Territory". Such collaborations eventually led the Catholic members of the community to grow more fully into their new ECC identity in relationship with the other four ECC communities of the Rocky Mountain Region, and since 2021 have been worshipping with Sixth Avenue UCC as St. Paul Catholic Community of Faith.
