= Edmund Hart Turpin =

British composer

Edmund Hart Turpin (4 May 1835 – 25 October 1907) was an organist, composer, writer and choir leader based in Nottingham and London.

== Life ==
Edmund Hart Turpin was born into a musical family that ran a dealership in musical instruments at 20 Chapel Bar, Nottingham. His father, James Turpin, was a lace maker and enthusiastic musical amateur. On 3 November 1857 he married Sarah Anne Watson (1834 – 26 January 1903), second daughter of Mr. Robert Watson of Whitemoor, Nottingham. They had known each other from early childhood, and had attended their first school together. Together they had one daughter, Florence Elizabeth. On 26 January 1903 his wife, Sarah Anne, died. It was at St. Bride's, Fleet Street on 2 May 1905, that he secondly married Miss Sarah Hobbs (? – 10 November 1918), daughter of the late Mr. John Hobbs, a surgeon of Bloomsbury. Miss Sarah Hobbs had been a most ardent church-worker in the parish of St. Bride's.

Although by descent a French Huguenot, and a consistent member of the Church of England for nearly the whole of his life, E.H. Turpin always preserved the memories of this official connection with the Roman Catholic cathedral in a warm corner of his heart. The solemn stately ceremonial, the devotional breath of the incense, the tender pleading of the Latin liturgy by the voice of its own native plainsong, were subjects he ever delighted to discourse upon. It was a pleasure to him to bear witness during the whole period being organist at St. Barnabas (1850–1865), although in constant and daily touch with the cathedral clergy, no one ever attempted to persuade him to renounce his ancestral Protestantism in order to embrace the Catholic Faith. The services of the Anglican Church with which he was so closely associated later on in life, much as he admired and respected them, never seemed to appeal to his highly strung emotional temperament as strongly as did either those of the Church of Rome, or of the Catholic and Apostolic Communion. The beautiful ritual and music of the stately Catholic Apostolic Church must have consoled him for his severance from the still greater magnificence of the worship of the Roman Church.

E.H. Turpin was buried at Highgate Cemetery (London), and his funeral was at St. Bride's, Fleet Street. His funeral service was attended by many Fellows, Associates and Members of the Royal College of Organists, and other distinguished musicians. He was succeeded by Mr. T. Westlake Morgan, a former organist of Bangor Cathedral. The flat stone above his grave, which is now entirely covered by earth, had the words of the first verse of "On the Resurrection Morning" inscribed on it. A memorial tablet has also been placed in the hall of the Royal College of Organists, close to the door of his official private room; this has his portrait and the melody of his tune "Mansfield", with the words of the first verse of the hymn engraved below the music.

== Career ==
Unlike Samuel Wesley, Henry Smart, Frederick Ouseley, John Stainer and others who were able to play at a very early age, Edmund Hart Turpin was about nine years old when he began to learn the pianoforte. He studied music under Charles Noble, organist at St Mary's Church, Nottingham, but also under other local teachers. He got on so well with his organ playing that when his father paid the fees for his last term's instruction, Mr. Noble insisted on returning the money, saying, My pupil now plays as well as I can myself: I can teach him nothing more. Early in 1847 – before his twelfth birthday – he became the organist of Friar Lane Congregational Church, Nottingham, which his family had attended for many years. He received no payment for his services. At age 13, the Roman Catholic Cathedral of St. Barnabas at Nottingham being then newly built and was in need of an organist; E.H. Turpin applied for this post. The clergy were satisfied with what they heard but considered him altogether too young. He assured the reverend fathers that he should try for the post again whenever a vacancy occurred. Two years later, in 1850, he applied again and successfully obtained this position at St. Barnabas.

Besides these appointments as organists in local churches in Nottingham, Edmund was also Band Master to the Robin Hood Rifles. At the age of 16 he gave his first London organ recital in 1851 at the Great Exhibition, Hyde Park. Later on he was heard at the Crystal Palace and upon other important organs in London, and from this time onwards he gradually increased his metropolitan work and connection; still, however, retaining his organistship at Nottingham, where he also acted as conductor for several musical societies. In 1857 he settled in London, but retained some appointments in Nottingham. Having been introduced to the Catholic Apostolic (Irvingite) Church by Mr. Pearson, the father of his brother Samuel's wife – an influential member of the Irvingite body in Nottingham – E.H. Turpin was appointed in 1860 as organist and choir-director of the Church of Christ the King, Bloomsbury, the central church of the Catholic and Apostolic Church in London.

The amount of work he did for the Catholic Apostolic Church in London was described as phenomenal by Henry Strange Hume (1840–1928), its chief minister and elder in the Central Church in London. In the Musical Herald of 1 December 1907 Hume wrote: On the invitation of the chief minister of the church in Duncan Street, Islington, Mr. Turpin came in 1858 to instruct the choir in Plainsong. Two years later he was permanently engaged in the church in Gordon Square as musical director. For many years he assiduously trained the boys in the choir school, and conducted the weekly choir practices. Later, he was relieved of the laborious school work, but he continued to take oversight of the music, and frequently played the organ at the services. Besides this, he wrote almost all the music sung in the church, and here, it may perhaps be said, he put in some of his best work, including some very fine settings of the Te Deum, and many beautiful anthems. In all, he composed nearly forty complete services. His major contributions for the music in the Catholic Apostolic Church were:

- the Hymn Tunes, published in 1872. It provides tunes for the 320 hymns in the 1871 edition of the Hymns for the Use of the Churches, which was edited by Edward Wilton Eddis, a member of Catholic Apostolic Church, and John Bate Cardale, an apostle in the Catholic Apostolic Church. Furthermore, it provides four metrical chants, one of which was written by E.H. Turpin. Most of the hymns were taken out of other hymnals. Some came from the Hymns Ancient and Modern which his friend John Stainer was asked to help to revise and for which Charles Steggall republished the Complete edition in 1906. In total 39 tunes were newly written by E.H. Turpin; most of these new tunes were to support the hymns of Edward Wilton Eddis.
- the Versicles and Responses for use in the Service of the Catholic Apostolic Church during the Eucharist Service, arranged by Edmund Hart Turpin and published before 1873
- The Book of Psalms, Pointed in Accordance with the Twelve Ancient Tones, published in 1879. As such it provided psalms in ancient style of plainchant.
- the Accompanying Harmonies to the tones for the Psalms in the twelve ancient church modes published in 1880. It provided organ harmonies for the psalmtones in The Book of Psalms, Pointed in Accordance with the Twelve Ancient Tones from 1879.
- Services and Anthems in Vocal Score with Organ Accompaniment.

Finding as time went on that the continual travelling back and forth to Nottingham (frequently at night) was too great a strain upon his health, he resigned with great regret his post at the Roman Catholic cathedral in Nottingham, and finally, in 1865, he settled for good in London. His brother, James Turpin, succeeded him as organist in Nottingham. Early in 1869, he undertook in addition to all this heavy church work, the duties of organist and choirmaster at St. George's, Bloomsbury. Once settled in London Turpin rapidly made friends, two of the earliest being Edward John Hopkins of the Temple Church, and John Pyke Hullah. Another friend for nearly forty years was Charles William Pearce (1856–1928), organist and later Hon. Treasurer of the Royal College of Organists; the latter wrote E.H. Turpin's biography in 1911. In London, E.H. Turpin studied under John Pyke Hullah as well as Ernst Pauer. It is known that E.H. Turpin also acted as teacher. For example, Edwin Lemare, Henry Houseley and John Cullen received musical education from him. Edwin Lemare even lived with the Turpin family for several years while E.H. Turpin groomed him for a recital career.

In 1863 the idea originated with Mr. Richard Limpus, organist of St Michael's, Cornhill in the City of London, to establish a College of Organists for the purpose of elevating and advancing the professional status of organists. This idea was enthusiastically welcomed by his colleagues. Among the twenty-one members of the Council of the College of Organists were Edward John Hopkins, Dr. Charles Steggall, Dr. Edwin George Monk, William Henry Longhurst, Ebenezer Prout, James Higgs as well as the first honorary Secretary Richard Limpus. E.H. Turpin was made a Fellow (without examination) in 1869, and became a Member of the Council shortly afterwards. In January 1872, he examined for the first time, and from then until July 1906. When Richard Limpus died in 1875, E.H. Turpin was appointed as honorary secretary of the College of Organists, and during his tenure the college obtained a royal charter in 1893 and thus became the Royal College of Organists, something which had always been the intention of Richard Limpus. Edmund Hart Turpin served as Honorary Secretary of the Royal College of Organists from 1875 till 1907. E.H. Turpin's position as Hon Sec. of the College of Organists coupled with his reputation, not only as a fine organ player but as a newspaper writer as well, naturally won for him a great deal of influence in the musical world. For a long time this manifested itself chiefly in the immense number of recitals he was asked to given in connection with the inauguration of new organs in churches, chapels, town halls, and other public buildings.

He was elected as Hon. Member of the Tonic Sol-fa College in 1885. Late in 1887 he resigned the organist's post at St. George's, Bloomsbury, and accepted a similar appointment at St. Bride's Fleet Street, where the fine Renatus Harris organ was a source of great enjoyment to him. He was awarded the Lambeth degree of Mus. Doc. by the Archbishop of Canterbury in 1889. John Stainer gave a speech at the dinner on the occasion of his receiving the degree of Doctor of Music. As such, John Stainer was one of those most intimately associated with Turpin in his connection (which was purely professional) with the Catholic Apostolic Church and a friend for nearly fifty years. As early as 1874 Turpin had been admitted as Hon. Licentiate of Trinity College of Music. He was elected as Hon. Member of the Royal Academy of Music in 1890.

In 1891 and 1901 he was listed as a Professor of Music. In 1892 E.H. Turpin was appointed Warden of Trinity College of Music and for eight years he edited the periodical Musical Standard. Besides being editor of the Musical Standard he became joint editor in 1891 of Musical News and has contributed many articles to periodical literature, besides giving lectures at the Royal College of Organists, the Musical Association, and other societies. He is widely known as a concert organist, and has opened organs in all parts of the kingdom; he is also a pianist, and plays nearly every instrument in the orchestra. He was also Dean of the Faculty of Music in the University of London from July 1902, and Secretary to the Board of Musical Studies. Around 1900, Edmund Hart Turpin was interested in poetry as he compiled Saul and other poems (1898), The palace of art and other poems with introduction and notes, (1898) and English and American Sonnets (1902). Turpin was organist of St. Bride's at the time of his death in 1907. He practically retained his position as organist at the Church of Christ the King, Bloomsbury until his death.

== Appointments ==
- Organist at Friar Lane Congregational Church, Nottingham 1847–1850
- Organist at St. Barnabas Cathedral, Nottingham 1850–1865
- Organist at the Church of Christ the King, Bloomsbury London 1860–1907
- Organist at St. George's Church, Bloomsbury 1869–1887
- Organist of St. Bride's Church, London 1888 – 1907

== Compositions ==
- Hymn tunes Argyle, Clifton and Mansfield
- Hymn tune on the text: God the Father, throned on high published in 1875 edition of the Hymns Ancient and Modern
- Hymn tune on the text: God the Father, God the Son published in 1875 edition of the Hymns Ancient and Modern
- Hymn tune on the text: God the Father, God the Son published in 1875 edition of the Hymns Ancient and Modern
- Magnificat And Nunc Dimittis in F
- Stabat Mater
- Te Deum
- Two masses
- Two cantatas, Jerusalem and A Song of Faith
- Two oratorios, St. John the Baptist, and Hezekiah
- The Monastery
- A symphony
- Trust ye in the Lord for ever (anthem)
- Anthem at the time of Incense (eucharist)
- The Lord hath chosen Zion (communion anthem)
- Evening anthem
- Anthem at the time of Incense (Evening prayer)
- Andante con moto (organ piece)
- Allegretto transcribed for the Organ (1884)
- Other anthems, organ and piano pieces.

== Hymnbooks ==
- Versicles and Responses for use in the Service of the Catholic Apostolic Church during the Eucharist Service, arranged by E.H. Turpin, second edition (1873), third edition (1880)
- Hymn Tunes, (Weekes, 1872)
- The Book of Psalms, Pointed in Accordance with the Twelve Ancient Tones, Edmund Hart Turpin (Chiswick Press, London, 1879)
- Accompanying Harmonies to the tones for the Psalms in the twelve ancient church modes, Edmund Hart Turpin (1880)
- 20 Responses to the Commandments, arranged from the sacred works of the great masters, Edmund Hart Turpin (1890)

== Other books and poetry ==
- An Inquiry into the origin and growth of certain musical idioms and expressions, E.H. Turpin, Proceedings of the Musical Association, Volume 7, Issue 1, 1880
- Some Observations on the Manipulation of Modern Wind Instruments, Edmund Hart Turpin (Weekes & Company, 1883)
- Saul and other poems, edited by Edmund Hart Turpin (1898)
- The palace of art and other poems with introduction and notes, Edmund Hart Turpin (Maynard, New York, 1898)
- Study for the Organ edited by Edmund Hart Turpin (1900)
- English and American Sonnets, Edmund Hart Turpin (Maynard, Merrill & Co., 1902)

== Use outside the Catholic Apostolic Church ==
It is known that The Book of Psalms, Pointed in Accordance with the Twelve Ancient Tones has been used in the Church of Scotland. More specifically, it has been drawn upon for the small selection of Gregorian settings which forms the appendix to The Scottish Psalter, 1929 (Prose). In 1935 it is recommended in the pamphlet published by the Committee on Public Worship and Aids to Devotion of the Church of Scotland: A Course of Reading for the Church Organist.

Henry Wiseman states in 1967 about "The Book of Psalms, pointed in accordance with the Twelve Ancient Tones" that it is the best adaptation of Gregorian tones to the words of the Bible translation of the Psalms he knows. The system of pointing is easy to follow by anyone who has ’'Words'’ in his heart. The notation of the plain-song is simple to any good solfa-ist. The harmonisation, if an organ accompaniment should be desired, can be founded on a rudimentary knowledge of a few simple chords which, later, can be eked out by the study of some of the numerous works on the harmonisation of plain-song.

Only some hymns of Edward Wilton Eddis published in the Hymns for the Uses of the Churches are found in other hymnbooks:

- O brightness of the Immortal Father's Face (translation from Greek)
- In us the hope of glory
- Thou Standest at the Altar

The tune St. Chrysotom in the Hymn Tunes edited by Edmund Hart Turpin is used in The Hymnal companion to the Book of common prayer with accompanying tunes (1890) edited by Edward Bickersteth, Charles Vincent, Denis John Wood and John Stainer as hymn 259.
