= William Bathurst =

William Bathurst may refer to:

- William Bathurst, 5th Earl Bathurst (1791–1878), British politician
- William Hiley Bathurst (1796–1877), British clergyman
