= Hymns Ancient and Modern =

English hymnal

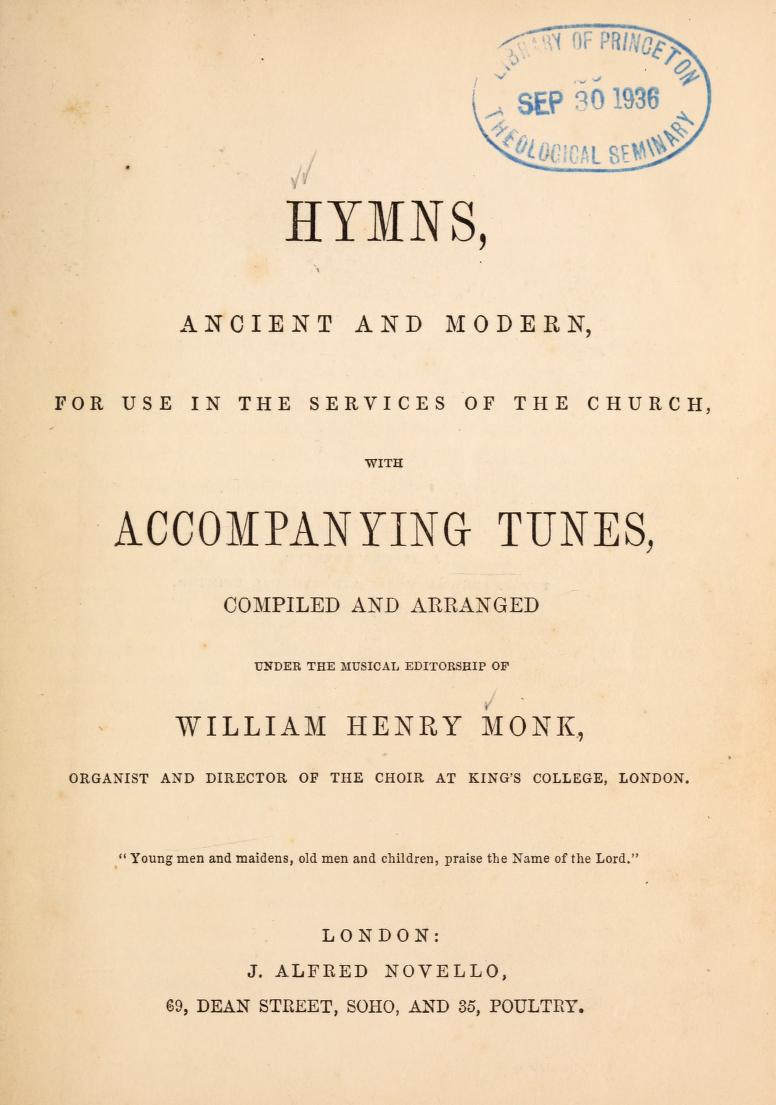
- Title page to the first edition, 1861
- Commissioned by: William Denton, Francis Murray, Sir Henry Williams Baker, 3rd Baronet
- Approved for: Church of England
- Released: 1861
- Publisher: (Currently) Canterbury Press
- Editor: William Henry Monk
- No. of Hymns: 273

Hymns Ancient and Modern is a hymnal in common use within the Church of England, a result of the efforts of the Oxford Movement. The hymnal was first published in 1861.

The organization publishing it has now been formed into a charitable trust, Hymns Ancient and Modern Ltd, and as of 2022 it publishes a wide range of hymnals as well as other theological and religious books and magazines, under imprints including the acquired publishers Canterbury Press and SCM Press.

== Origin ==
=== Hymn singing ===
By 1830 the regular singing of hymns in the dissenting churches (outside the Church of England) had become widely accepted due to hymn writers like Isaac Watts, Charles Wesley and others. In the Church of England hymn singing was not an integral part of Orders of Service until the early 19th century, and hymns, as opposed to metrical psalms, were not officially sanctioned. From about 1800, parish churches started to use different hymn collections in informal services, like the Lock Hospital Collection (1769) by Martin Madan, the Olney Hymns (1779) by John Newton and William Cowper and A Collection of Hymns for the Use of The People Called Methodists (1779) by John Wesley and Charles Wesley.

=== Oxford Movement ===
A further impetus to hymn singing in the Anglican Church came in the 1830s from the Oxford Movement, led by John Keble and John Henry Newman. Being an ecclesiastical reform movement within the Anglican Church, the Oxford Movement wanted to recover the lost treasures of breviaries and service books of the ancient Greek and Latin churches. As a result Greek, Latin and even German hymns in translation entered the mainstream of English hymnody. These translations were composed by people like John Chandler, John Mason Neale, Thomas Helmore, Edward Caswall, Jane Laurie Borthwick and Catherine Winkworth. Besides stimulating the translation of medieval hymns, and use of plainsong melodies, the Oxford Reformers, inspired by Reginald Heber's work, also began to write original hymns. Among these hymnwriters were clergy like Henry Alford, Henry Williams Baker, Sabine Baring-Gould, John Keble and Christopher Wordsworth and laymen like Matthew Bridges, William Chatterton Dix and Folliott Sandford Pierpoint.

=== Accomplishment of the Hymns Ancient and Modern ===
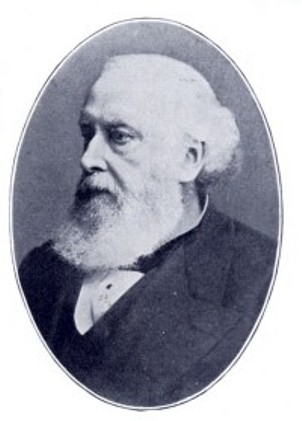
William Henry Monk, original editor of the hymnal.

The growing popularity of hymns inspired the publication of more than 100 hymnals during the period 1810–1850. The sheer number of these collections prevented any one of them from being successful. A beginning of what would become the Hymns Ancient and Modern was made with the Hymns and Introits (1852), edited by George Cosby White. The idea for the hymn-book arose in 1858 when two clergymen, both part of the Oxford Movement, met on a train: William Denton of St Bartholomew, Cripplegate, co-editor of the Church Hymnal (1853) and Francis Henry Murray, editor of the Hymnal for Use in the English Church Denton suggested that the 1852 Hymnal for use in the English Church by Francis Murray and the Hymns and Introits by George Cosby White should be amalgamated to satisfy the need for standardisation of the hymn books in use throughout England.

Besides their idea, Henry Williams Baker and Rev. P. Ward were already engaged on a similar scheme for rival books. Given the lack of unanimity in the church's use of hymns, Baker thought it necessary to compile a single book which would command general confidence. After taking soundings, Baker in 1858 associated himself with about 20 clergymen, to promote the use of a standard hymn book. In October of that year an advertisement in The Guardian, the High Church newspaper, invited co-operation, and over 200 clergymen responded.

In January 1859 the committee set to work under the lead of Henry Williams Baker. An appeal was made to the clergy and to their publishers to withdraw their individual collections and to support this new combined venture. They founded a board, called the "Proprietors", which oversaw both the publication of the hymnal and the application of the profits to support appropriate charities, or to subsidise the purchase of the hymn books by poor parishes. The superintendent was William Henry Monk. One of the advisors, John Keble, recommended that it should be made a comprehensive hymn-book. This committee set themselves to produce a hymn-book which would be a companion to the Book of Common Prayer. Another intention of the founders of Hymns Ancient and Modern was that it would improve congregational worship for everybody. A specimen was issued in May 1859. In 1860 a trial edition was published, with the imprimatur of Dr Renn Hampden, Sir Henry Baker's diocesan. The first full edition with tunes, under the musical editorship of Professor W. H. Monk, King's College, London, appeared on 20 March 1861.

=== Sources for the Hymns Ancient and Modern ===
Hymns Ancient and Modern was an eclectic collection of hymns from different traditions, aiming to achieve a standard edition. Sources included:

- the translations from Greek by John Chandler in his Hymns of the Primitive Church.
- the translations from Latin by John Mason Neale in his Hymnal Noted (Novello, Ewer and Company, 1851) and the Accompanying Harmonies to The Hymnal Noted, together with Thomas Helmore, (1852), the Mediaeval Hymns and Sequences (first edition 1851), and the Hymns of the Eastern Church, translated with Notes and an Introduction (1870, first edition appeared in 1865)
- the translations from Latin by Edward Caswall in his Lyra Catholica: Containing All the Hymns of the Roman Breviary and Missal (1851)
- the translations from German by Catherine Winkworth in her Lyra Germanica, Hymns for the Sundays and chief festivals of the Christian Year, Translated from the German (1855 edition)
- the translations from German by Jane Laurie Borthwick in her Hymns from the land of Luther: translated from the German (first edition in 1853)
- the churchly hymns from the Oxford Movement. In the Preface of the 1861 edition of the Hymns Ancient and Modern John Keble's The Christian Year: Thoughts in Verse for the Sundays and holidays throughout the year, 1837 (first edition appeared in 1827) was mentioned explicitly.
- the hymns from the evangelical stream (dissenters and Methodists); composers included the clergy William Hiley Bathurst, Horatius Bonar, Henry Francis Lyte, John Henry Newman, and lay persons like Sarah Flower Adams, Cecil Frances Alexander, William Henry Havergal, Frances Ridley Havergal and Jane Eliza Leeson. In the Preface of the 1861 edition of the Hymns Ancient and Modern William Henry Havergal's Old Church Psalmody, (1849) was mentioned explicitly.

Henry Williams Baker wrote and translated many of the hymns which it contains, and his ability, his profound knowledge of hymnology, and his energetic discharge of the duties of chairman of its committee for twenty years, mainly contributed to its success. Not all the hymns in these sources were already provided with tunes. Therefore, composers like William Henry Monk, the editor of the 1861 edition, John Bacchus Dykes and Frederick Ouseley, John Stainer, Henry Gauntlett and Edmund Hart Turpin provided new hymn tunes. Among the hymns with newly-composed tunes were Eternal Father, Strong to Save and Praise to the Holiest in the Height (John Bacchus Dykes), Onward, Christian Soldiers (Arthur Sullivan) and Abide with Me (William Henry Monk).

The Hymns Ancient and Modern was austere in style and conformed to the Anglican Book of Common Prayer. It also established the practice of writing tunes for specific texts and publishing both texts and tunes together rather than in separate collections, which had been the practice until then. Roughly, the hymns were arranged in the order of the Prayer Book. More specifically, there were separate sections grouped according to liturgical criteria: hymns for the daily offices, Sunday, the church year, Holy Communion and other sacraments, and the various feasts. Furthermore, the Hymns Ancient and Modern was the first influential book to attach "Amen" to every hymn.

=== Impact ===
Hymns Ancient and Modern experienced immediate and overwhelming success, becoming possibly the most popular English hymnal ever published. The music, expressive and tuneful, greatly assisted to its popularity. Total sales in 150 years were over 170 million copies., by 2024 nearly 200 million As such, it set the standard for many later hymnals like The English Hymnal which first appeared in 1906 and was succeeded by The New English Hymnal in 1986.

== Editions ==
=== Early editions ===
The first edition, musically supervised by William Henry Monk, was published in 1861 by Novello & Co, with 273 hymns. They also published the 1868 Appendix; but following negotiations, the whole publishing project was placed in the hands of William Clowes and Son later that year. It was revised in 1875 by Monk to produce the second edition, to which Charles Steggall added several supplementary hymns in 1889. In 1904 a "new and revised edition" was published, edited by Bertram Luard-Selby. After many complaints about the difference between this and its predecessors, Charles Steggall's edition was republished in 1906 as the "Complete edition".

=== Standard edition ===
In 1916 the "old complete edition" was republished for the last time, with a second supplement by Sydney Nicholson. In 1922, the "standard edition" was published, more strongly based on the "old complete edition" than the less popular "new and revised edition". This also was edited by Nicholson, who was the musical editor until he died in 1947.

=== Revised edition ===
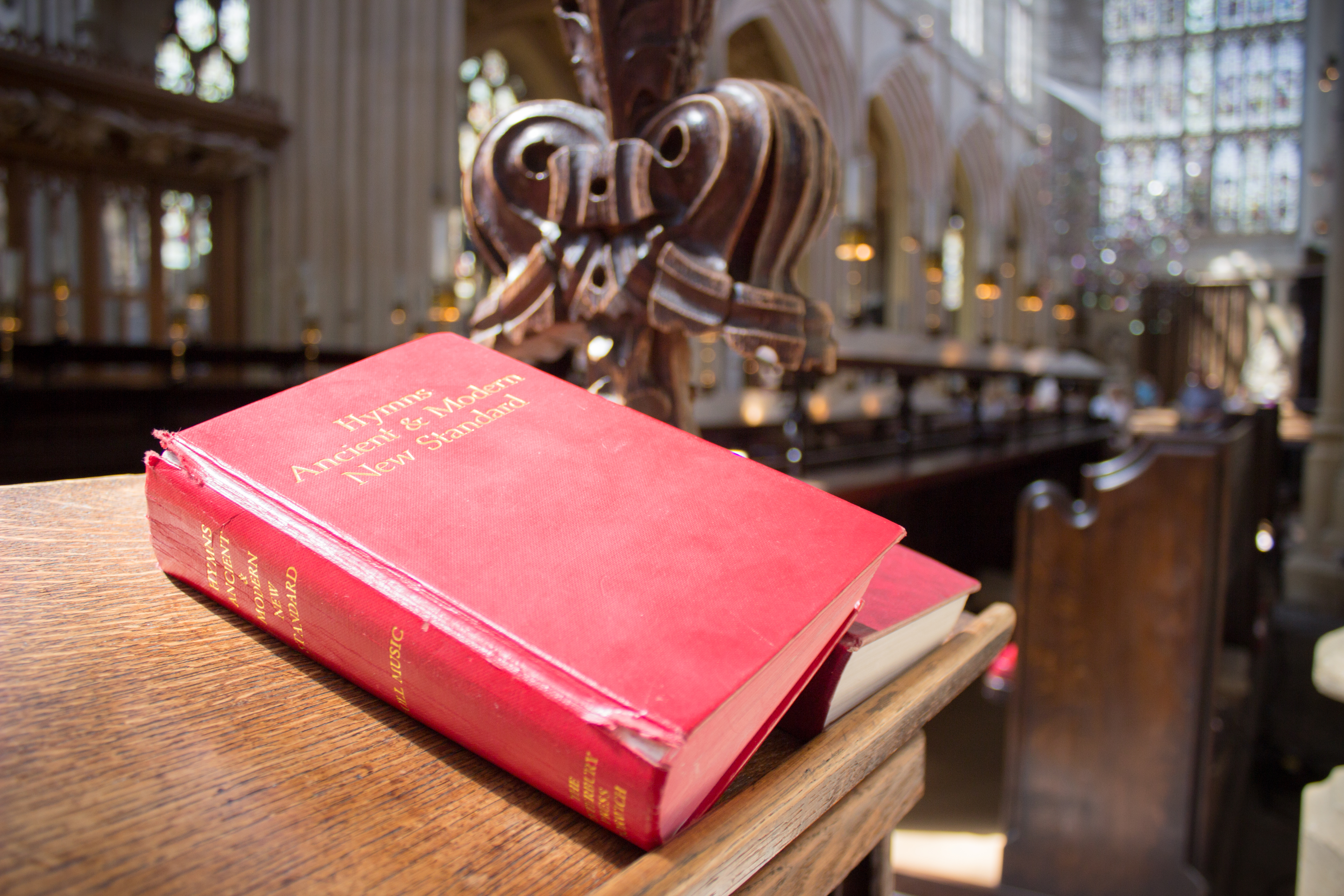
The New Standard Edition on a stall in Bath Abbey.

In 1950 the "revised edition" was published, with G. H. Knight and J. Dykes Bower having both edited since the death of Nicholson. Many hymns were weeded out from the 1950 edition as the editors wished to make space for more recent compositions and to thin out the over-supplemented previous versions. Bower was organist at St. Paul's Cathedral, whilst Knight held the same post at Canterbury.

=== New Standard Edition ===
In 1975 the proprietors formed a limited company and a registered charity, and in 1983 published the "New Standard Edition". This consisted of 333 of the 636 hymns included in A and M Revised (AMR) and the entire 200-hymn contents of 100 Hymns for Today (HHT, 1969) and More Hymns for Today (MHT, 1980).

=== Common Praise ===
In 2000 Hymns Ancient & Modern Ltd, through its subsidiary the Canterbury Press, published a new hymnal, this time called Common Praise. This was printed by William Clowes Ltd. of Suffolk.

=== Sing Praise ===
In September 2010 Canterbury Press and the Royal School of Church Music published Sing Praise, subtitled "Hymns and Songs for Refreshing Worship", containing 330 recently written hymn, song and short chant compositions. The selection was designed to complement Common Praise in particular, but also other hymn books in current use.

=== Ancient and Modern ===
In March 2013 Canterbury Press published Ancient and Modern, so reverting to the original title without the word "Hymns", but also subtitled Hymns and Songs for Refreshing Worship, a new edition designed for contemporary patterns of worship. It contains 847 items, including some items from Common Praise and Sing Praise, ranging from psalm settings to John L. Bell, Bernadette Farrell, Stuart Townend and others. In 2014 the British organist John Keys completed recordings of organ accompaniments of all the hymns in the book.

== Publisher ==
In 1989 Hymns Ancient & Modern Ltd. bought the Church Times, the Church of England's periodical, and bought SCM Press in 1997. Other imprints include Canterbury Press. In 2007 it became the distributor for St Andrew Press, the Church of Scotland's publishing house.

== Japanese edition ==
The Japanese edition of Hymns Ancient Modern, called Kokin Seika Shū (古今聖歌集) was published in 1902 by the Nippon Sei Ko Kai (NSKK), with the subsequent several revisions. It was used until 2006, when it was replaced by NSKK Hymnal (日本聖公会聖歌集).

== See also ==
- Songs of Praise
- Sunday Half Hour
- The English Hymnal, established by Percy Dearmer, the successor of which is the New English Hymnal
- The Book of Common Prayer, later supplemented by the Alternative Service Book in 1980, and then Common Worship in 2000
- List of English-language hymnals by denomination
