= Francis Krebs =

Bishop of the Ecumenical Catholic Communion

Francis Krebs (born December 12, 1946) is an American Bishop of the Ecumenical Catholic Communion who is currently serving as Presiding Bishop. He took office September 18, 2015 replacing Bishop Peter Elder Hickman, founding Bishop and Presiding Bishop from 2003-2015. With his election, the Office of Presiding Bishop moved to St. Louis, MO.

== Biography ==
=== Early life and education ===
Krebs was born in Brentwood, Missouri on December 12, 1946. He grew up Roman Catholic in St. Mary Magdalene Parish and attended St. Louis University High School run by the Jesuits. Krebs received his bachelor's degree from Cardinal Glennon College and received his seminary training at Kenrick Seminary, both in St. Louis. He was ordained into the Roman Catholic Archdiocese of St. Louis in 1972.

=== Ministry in the Roman Catholic Church ===
Krebs served as a Roman Catholic priest for 18 years as a parish pastor at St. Ann, Pius the Fifth and Sts. Peter & Paul.

=== Leaving the Roman Catholic Priesthood ===
Krebs left ministry in the Roman Catholic Church in 1990. He worked for a St. Louis based behavioral health firm as a management consultant. During this time, Frank met and married his partner. As a married gay man, he could not return to the Roman Catholic priesthood, but Krebs desired to return to priestly ministry.

=== Joining the Ecumenical Catholic Communion ===
In 2005, Krebs and about 20 others started a church calling itself Sts. Clare & Francis. In the early years of formation, the parish became a member community in the Ecumenical Catholic Communion and Krebs was incardinated as an Ecumenical Catholic Communion priest. As of 2015, the parish had 125 registered members.

Krebs was appointed by then Presiding Bishop, Peter E. Hickman, as vicar of the midwest region from 2008-2010. In October 2010, Krebs was elected as President of the House of Pastors in the Ecumenical Catholic Communion and served in that position until 2013. He also served as Co-Chair on the National Council of Church's Racial Justice Working Group from 2011-2013. During that time the Ecumenical Catholic Communion was not a member of the National Council of Churches (NCC). Krebs was invited by the Ecumenical Catholic Communion's partner, Bishop Chuck Leigh of the Apostolic Catholic Church, a member church of the NCC. Today the Ecumenical Catholic Communion is an official member of the NCC.

=== Episcopal Election ===
Krebs was nominated for Presiding Bishop and then elected to that post at the 2014 Synod of the Ecumenical Catholic Communion in Denver, CO. His commissioning was held at Eden Theological Seminary on September 18, 2015.
