= Alan Wilson (composer) =

British composer of church music

Alan J. Wilson (26 May 1947 - 4 April 2026) was a British composer of church music.

== Professional career ==
He was born in 1947, in Eastwood, Nottinghamshire, UK.

He won a scholarship to the Royal College of Music. He studied piano with Phyllis Sellick, harpsichord with Dr. Thorntam Lofthouse, and composition with John Lambert. He attended composition masterclasses with Nadia Boulanger. He went on to study at the Conservatorium van Amsterdam, where he studied keyboard with Gustav Leonhardt.

From 1974 to 1986 he was Director of Music at the Church of Christ the King, Bloomsbury, for which he wrote many choral works. In 1976, he became Director of Music at Queen Mary College, University of London. There, he composed 'The Palace of Delights' and 'The Harmony of the Spheres.' He conducted research to restore and edit songs from the Queen Mary College, including the 'Westfield Songbook,' and set writings of Constance Louisa Maynard to music, including 'The Downs' as well as several poems and hymns.

In 1986, he became Organist and Director of Music at the Bow Bells Church of St. Mary-le-Bow, London. There, he researched music by William Babell and John Stanley and composed '2015 Requiem.' During his tenure, Alan advised on the design, construction, and tonal finishing of the Kenneth Tickell organ, installed in 2010.

He retired from Queen Mary College, University of London in 2013, and St. Mary-le-Bow in 2018. He became Chairman of the D.H. Lawrence Society in 2020. Wilson adapted Lawrence's first novel 'The White Peacock' in collaboration with Malcolm Gray. It was produced as a Cantata called 'The Voice of Nethermere' in 2022. In 2023, Wilson composed a musical setting to Lawrence's poems on trees.

He was the Director of Music at Holy Trinity Church, Eltham, London. He produced many recordings and worked extensively for this church. He retired in January, 2026.

He has used synthesizers in classical music in pieces including the 'Norwich Mass' and 'Norwich Magnificat and Nunc Dimittis', written for the Norwich Festival of Contemporary Church Music. They were published by Weinberger along with a commissioned work for Christ Church Cathedral, Indianapolis.

Wilson has directed and also composed and arranged compositions for broadcasting services, mainly the BBC Daily Service, .

Wilson's Mass of Light was performed in 2010 at St George's Cathedral, Cape Town.

He has received frequent invitations from the heads of dioceses in Germany to run workshops, (for example, at the Wolfsburg Catholic Conference Centre in the diocese of Essen), mainly using his own, often new works. His Magnificat, from 'Christus Rex', is a major performed work in Germany and appears in 'Freiburger Chorbuch,' other works.

== Performing artist ==
As well as being a recital organist, he has worked in mainstream ensembles as a harpsichordist. He was in the Consort of Musicke and performed with Emma Kirkby and Anthony Rooley.

== Awards ==
He received an honorary Associate award from the Royal School of Church Music in Durham Cathedral in May 2010, for his work for the RSCM, and his work as a church composer.

During his lifetime Wilson produced a number of CD's including; Music at Christ the King, Canticles at Christ the King, Cantate Domino, Inspired by Bells, Lord of all Life, Where the Clock Tower stands in the Mile End Road, Queen Mary and Westfield - a literary and musical celebration, Turn again (music from St. Mary-le-Bow), and the 2015 Requiem.

Wilson died on 4th April 2026, following a 17 year battle with Cancer.

== Musical Works ==
- Christ is now risen again
- Mass of Light
- Mass of All Saints
- Mass of Regeneration
- Mass of the Holy Trinity
- Magnificat and Nunc Dimittis
- Seasonal Carols Old and New (4 volumes)
- Alan Wilson. Our Faith is a Light. SATB and Organ. 8pp. Josef Weinberger Ltd., London, UK (M570053698, HL.48016538)
- Alan Wilson (1999). Haec dies / Christus in Ewigkeit. High Voice, SATB Choir, Organ (Pianoforte, Keyboard). 8pp. Carus-Verlag (CA.739900)
- Alan Wilson (2004). Missa Adventis et Quadragesima (Missa Adventis et Quadragesima). Speaker, Congregation, SATB Choir, Organ. 16pp. Carus-Verlag (CA.2706200)
- Alan Wilson. Fantasia on Ubi Caritas (Organ Solo). Organ. Weinberger. 19pp. Josef Weinberger Ltd., London, UK (M570053810, HL.48016569)
- Alan Wilson (1992). Missa Transfigurationis. Solo Soprano, Organ (Children's Choir or Women's Choir or Schola). 12pp. Carus-Verlag (CA.2706100)
- Alan Wilson. Cantate Domino. Choir/Organ. 11pp. Josef Weinberger Ltd., London, UK.
- Alan Wilson. Light of Christ. SATB Choir. 2pp. Josef Weinberger Ltd., London, UK.
- Alan Wilson. Let There be Light. SATB Choir. 2pp. Josef Weinberger Ltd., London, UK.
- Alan Wilson. The Holly Carol. Choir/Piano. 6pp. Josef Weinberger Ltd., London, UK.
- Alan Wilson. The Distant Light. Choir/Piano. 6pp. Josef Weinberger Ltd., London, UK.
- Alan Wilson. From East to West. Choir/Piano or Organ. 5pp. Josef Weinberger Ltd., London, UK.
- Alan Wilson. We Were Born for a Journey. Choir/Piano. 3pp. Josef Weinberger Ltd., London, UK.
- Alan Wilson. Come Holy Ghost. Choir/Piano. 3pp. Josef Weinberger Ltd., London
- Alan Wilson. The Wynstan Voluntary. Organ Solo. 2pp. Josef Weinberger Ltd., London
- Alan Wilson. Cathedral Responses. SATB. 12pp. Joseph Weinberger (HL.48016537)
- Alan Wilson. Our Faith is a Light. Soprano Solo, SATB and Organ. 8pp. Joseph Weinberger (HL.48016538)
