= Thomas Carlyle (lawyer) =

Scottish lawyer and "apostle" of the Catholic Apostolic Church

- Born: July 17, 1803
- Died: January 28, 1855 (aged 51)
- Education: University of Edinburgh
- Occupations: Lawyer and Apostle

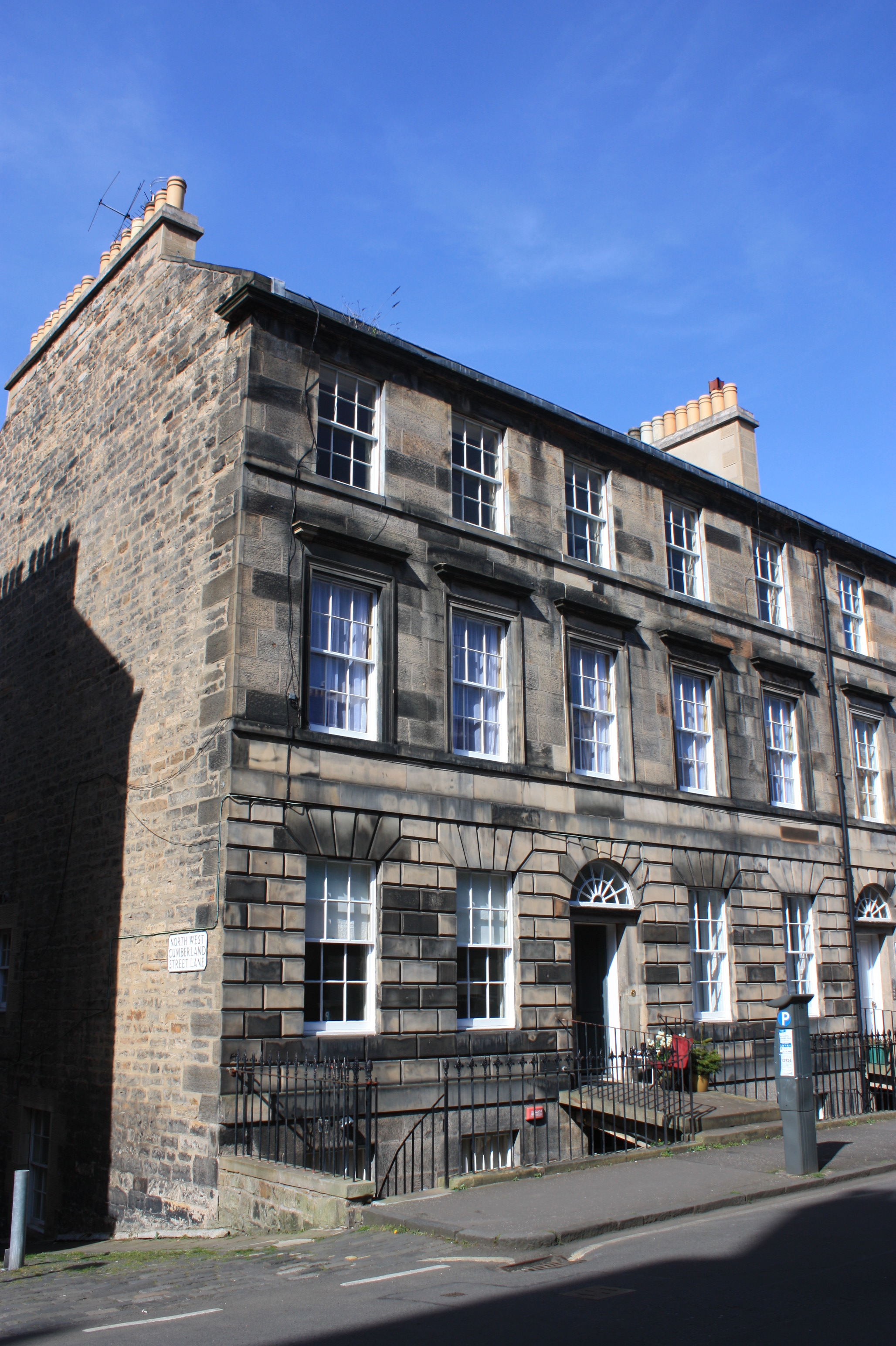
Carlyle's house at 62 Cumberland Street, Edinburgh

Thomas Carlyle (17 July 1803 – 28 January 1855) was a Scottish lawyer and apostle of the Catholic Apostolic Church.

== Life and Career ==
Carlyle was born in King's Grange near Dumfries in Scotland.

He studied and graduated in law from the University of Edinburgh. In 1824, he was registered as lawyer at the Scottish bar. In October 1824, he inherited the title Baron Carlyle of Torthorwald.

From 1830 on, he came in contact with the Scottish minister Edward Irving who was in process of forming the Catholic Apostolic Church and was named an "apostle” on 1 May 1835. He was given responsibility for the work of that group in Northern Germany.

In the 1830s, "Thomas Carlyle, advocate" is listed as living at 62 Cumberland Street in Edinburgh's New Town.

He is not to be confused with his better-known cousin the man of letters Thomas Carlyle, born a few years earlier also in Dumfriesshire. He too was connected to Irving, who introduced him to his wife, Jane Welsh. One biographer asserts that the similarities did cause confusion: "As a 'double-goer', perplexing strangers in foreign parts as well as at home, the 'Apostle' was occasionally an innocent, inadvertent nuisance to 'our Tom'."

This Thomas Carlyle (lawyer) was the author of the book Shall Turkey Live or Die? (London: Thomas Bosworth, 1854). It has been mistakenly included in the Delphi Complete Works of Thomas Carlyle available on Amazon Kindle. This work is not in the authoritative Bibliography of Thomas Carlyle's Writings and Ana by Isaac Watson Dyer (1928).
