= Robert Hall Baynes =

English Anglican priest

Robert Hall Baynes (* 10 March 1831, Wellington, Somerset; † 27 March 1895, Oxford, Oxfordshire) was an Anglican priest, a hymnodist and a hymn writer. He was editor of the Lyra Anglicana, which was among the most influential hymnals of the Oxford Movement in the 1860s and 1870s, having a relatively broad selection of Anglican authors.

== Life ==
Baynes was born on 10 March 1831 at Wellington, Somerset, the son of Rev. Joseph Baynes and Ann Day Ash. Baynes married Clara Tate in Kensington, London, with whom he had four children.

He was educated at St. Edmund Hall, Oxford and graduated in 1856 with a Bachelor of Arts, and in 1859 with his Master of Arts. He took Holy Orders (deacon 1855, priest 1856), and was successively curate of Christ Church, Blackfriars, London (1855–58), perpetual curate of St Paul, Whitechapel (1858–62) and Holy Trinity, Maidstone (1862–66), and vicar of St Michael and All Angels, Coventry (1866–79). In 1870 he became Bishop designate of Madagascar; but he resigned in 1871 before taking up the post. In 1873 he was appointed as Hon. Canon of Worcester Cathedral, and in 1880 Vicar of Holy Trinity, Folkestone.

During his later life, Baynes became an alcoholic, and was convicted and imprisoned several times for fraud and theft. In October 1892 he was convicted of indecent assault upon on a girl of 10 in Twickenham.

He died at Oxford in March 1895 by accidentally catching his clothes alight while standing in front of the open fire in his lodgings.

Robert Hall Baynes is more widely known as the compiler of some most successful books of sacred poetry than as an original hymn-writer, although some of his hymns are of considerable merit, and are in extensive use. Of these the best known are "Jesu, to Thy table led," and "Holy Spirit, Lord of glory." He was editor of Lyra Anglicana (1862), English Lyrics (1865), The Canterbury Hymnal (1864) and the Supplementary Hymnal (1869), The Illustrated Book of Sacred Poems (1867) and author of the Autumn Memories and other Verses (1869). His hymns appeared in The Canterbury Hymnal, the Autumn Memories, and in the Churchman’s Shilling Magazine, of which he was sometime editor. His Home Songs for Quiet Hours were published in 1878, and the Hymns for Home Mission Services in the Church of England in 1879. To his eucharistic manual, At the Communion Time, a series of hymns for Holy Communion were added.

== Works ==
Hymnbooks

- Hymns for the Public Worship of the Church, compiled by Robert Hall Baynes (1859)
- Lyra Anglicana; hymns and sacred songs edited by Robert Hall Baynes, (London, printed for Houlston & Wright, 1862)
- The Canterbury hymnal: a book of common praise adapted to the services in the Book of Common prayer, selected and arranged by Robert Hall Baynes, (London: Houlston & Wright, 1863)
- English Lyrics: A Collection of English Poetry to the Present Day, edited by Robert Hall Baynes (1865)
- The Supplemental Hymn Book, designed to Supplement Hymns Ancient and Modern, Robert Hall Baynes (1866)
- The illustrated book of sacred poems Robert Hall Baynes (editor); illustrated by J.D. Watson, (London; New York: Cassell & Co, Petter, and Galpin, 1867)
- Lyra Anglicana; hymns and sacred songs, Robert Hall Baynes, (London, Houlston & Wright, 1868)
- The Supplemental Hymnal, 1869, edited by Robert Hall Baynes (London: Houlston & Wright)
- Lyra Anglicana; hymns and sacred songs, Robert Hall Baynes, (London, Houlston, 1870)
- Home Songs for Quiet Hours, edited by Robert Hall Baynes, (1874)
- Home Songs for Quiet Hours edited by Robert Hall Baynes (1878)
- Lyra Anglicana: Hymns and Sacred Songs, 1879 edition, Robert Hall Baynes (London, Houlston, 1879)
- Hymns for Home Mission Services in the Church of England, Robert Hall Baynes (1879)
- Lyra Anglicana: hymns and sacred songs / collected and arranged by Robert H. Baynes, Robert Hall Baynes, (London: Houlston and Sons, 1884)
- Easter-song: a poem by the Rt. Rev. Robert Hall Baynes; illustrated by J. H. Gratacap, Robert Hall Baynes, (New York: Anson D.F. Randolph & Co, circa 1886)

Other books

- The faith that overcometh: a sermon preached in the parish church of Wivenhoe, Essex, on Sunday, June 22, 1856, Robert Hall Baynes, (London, T. Hatchard, 1856)
- Autumn memories and other verses by the Vicar of S. Michael and All Angels, Coventry Robert Hall Baynes, with illustrations by John Leighton and E.F.C. Clarke (London: Houlston & Wright, 1869)
- Manual for Holy Communion, Robert Hall Baynes, (1869)
- The Manual of Family Prayer for Christian Households, Robert Hall Baynes, (1869)
- The Churchman's shilling magazine and family treasury, Robert Hall Baynes (1871)
- At the Communion Time

Hymns

- As spring's sweet breath after long wintry snows
- Bend every knee at Jesus' name
- Calm lay the city in its double sleep
- God Almighty in Thy temple
- Great Shepherd of Thy ransomed flock
- He is not dead but only lieth sleeping
- Holy Spirit, Lord of glory
- Jesu, Thou true and living Bread
- Jesus, to Thy table led
- Lord Jesu, on our forehead
- Neath the stars that shone so bright
- No room within the dwelling
- O Jesus Christ, the holy One
- O Man of Sorrows, Who didst die to save
- The day is done; beside the sultry shore
