= Restored Apostolic Mission Church =

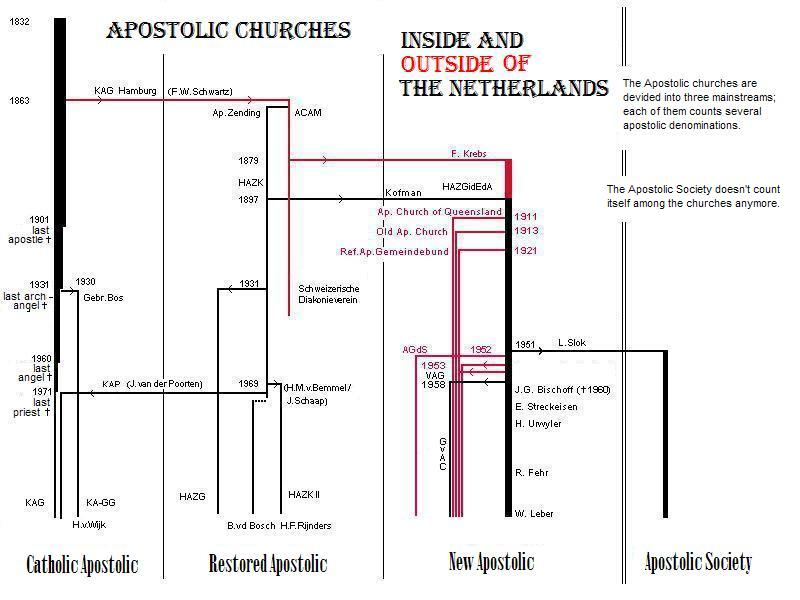
Scheme of several Apostolic Churches inside and outside the Netherlands from 1830 until 2005. Click on the image to enlarge.

The Restored Apostolic Mission Church (Hersteld Apostolische Zendingkerk - HAZK) was a Bible-believing, chiliastic church society in the Netherlands, Germany, South Africa and Australia. It came forth from the Catholic Apostolic Congregation at Hamburg that separated itself from the mother-church in 1863. By 1969-1971 it had divided into three sections.
