= Mary Ramerman =

Mary Ramerman is one of the founders of the Spiritus Christi church in Rochester, New York. Ramerman, a convert to Catholicism from Methodism who wished to become a priest, was encouraged by James Callan, who was serving as Administrator of Corpus Christi parish in Rochester, to migrate to his parish from her native California to join the staff.

== Excommunication ==
After several years of controversy (particularly around Ramerman's pushing the traditional limits of lay leadership and her presence at the altar wearing a half-stole, along with the parish's practice of radical eucharistic hospitality), in 1998 the Diocese of Rochester's bishop, Matthew H. Clark, transferred Father Callan from Corpus Christi Church, in order to bring the parish back into line (under the orders of the head of the Congregation for the Doctrine of the Faith, Cardinal Joseph Ratzinger, later Pope Benedict XVI). A group of Corpus Christi Church members then started a new community which seceded from the Roman Catholic Church under the leadership of Ramerman and others and Callan shortly joined them in the "New Faith Community" as it was called until it took on the permanent name of "Spiritus Christi Church" in August 1999. Both Ramerman and Callan were declared to have excommunicated themselves (excommunication latae sententiae) by the bishop.

A few years later, the community invited Bishop Peter Hickman from the Old Catholic Church, and later of the Ecumenical Catholic Communion, in California ordained Ramerman as a priest on November 17, 2001, at Rochester's Eastman Theatre "in front of 3,000 people who attended despite the threat of excommunication by the Roman Catholic diocese." Later, on February 22, 2003, he returned to ordain Denise Donato a priest at the historic Hochstein music hall. Spiritus Christi Church celebrated its 10th anniversary in 2008. Writing of her congregation, Moment Magazine has noted that "at 1,500, her Catholic congregation is now the largest non-Roman Catholic one in the country. In addition to taking a stand on ordaining women, her parish celebrates marriages for gay and lesbian couples, and welcomes everyone to partake in the Eucharist."

Ramerman continues to serve the community to this day. She and Donato are considered by Spiritus Christi, the Ecumenical Catholic Communion, and other progressives in the Catholic tradition to be Catholic priests, although the Roman Catholic Church does not recognize them as such because it is impossible to validly ordain women to the Roman Catholic priesthood.
