= Eden Upton Eddis =

British painter (1812–1901)

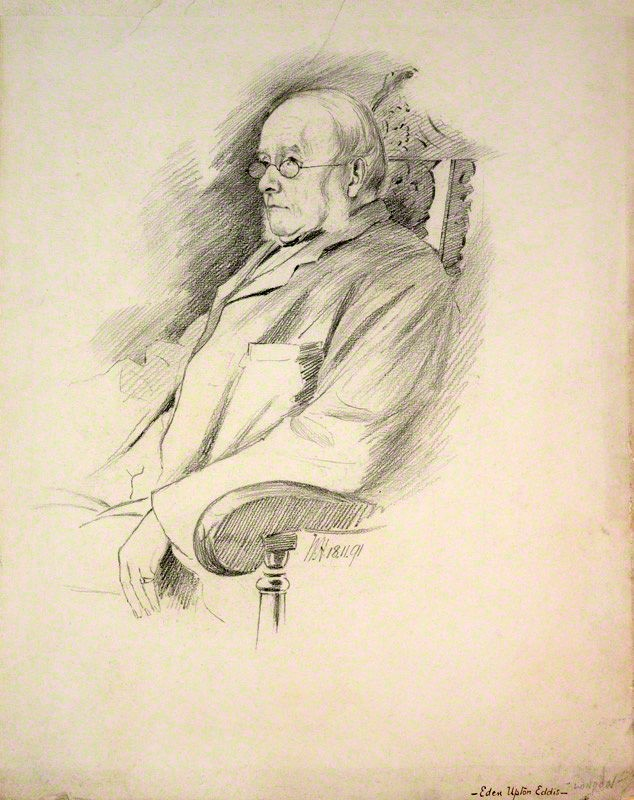
- 1891 portrait of Eden Upton Eddis by William Walker Hodgson
- Born: 9 May 1812; Newington Green, London, England
- Died: 7 April 1901 (aged 88); Shalford, Surrey, England

Eden Upton Eddis (9 May 1812 – 7 April 1901) was a British portrait artist.

== Life ==
Eden was born in Newington Green in 1812, his brother Edward became a hymn writer.

Eden enrolled at the Royal Academy Schools in 1828. From the age of 25 until he was nearly 70 his work was regularly exhibited regularly at the Royal Academy between 1837 and 1881, and is best known for his portraits, which included many of well-known people; the National Portrait Gallery in London holds a drawing of him by Walker Hodgson.

Among the subjects of his portraits were the historian Lord Macaulay, Bishop Charles James Blomfield, Archbishop Sumner, the essayist and fashionable cleric Sydney Smith, the sculptor Francis Leggatt Chantrey and Peter Mark Roget the compiler of the original thesaurus. He died in 1901 aged 88 at Shalford near Guildford.

== Legacy ==
Eddis has over 100 works in the National Portrait Gallery and 30 paintings in public collections in the United Kingdom.
