= Church of Christ the King, Bloomsbury =

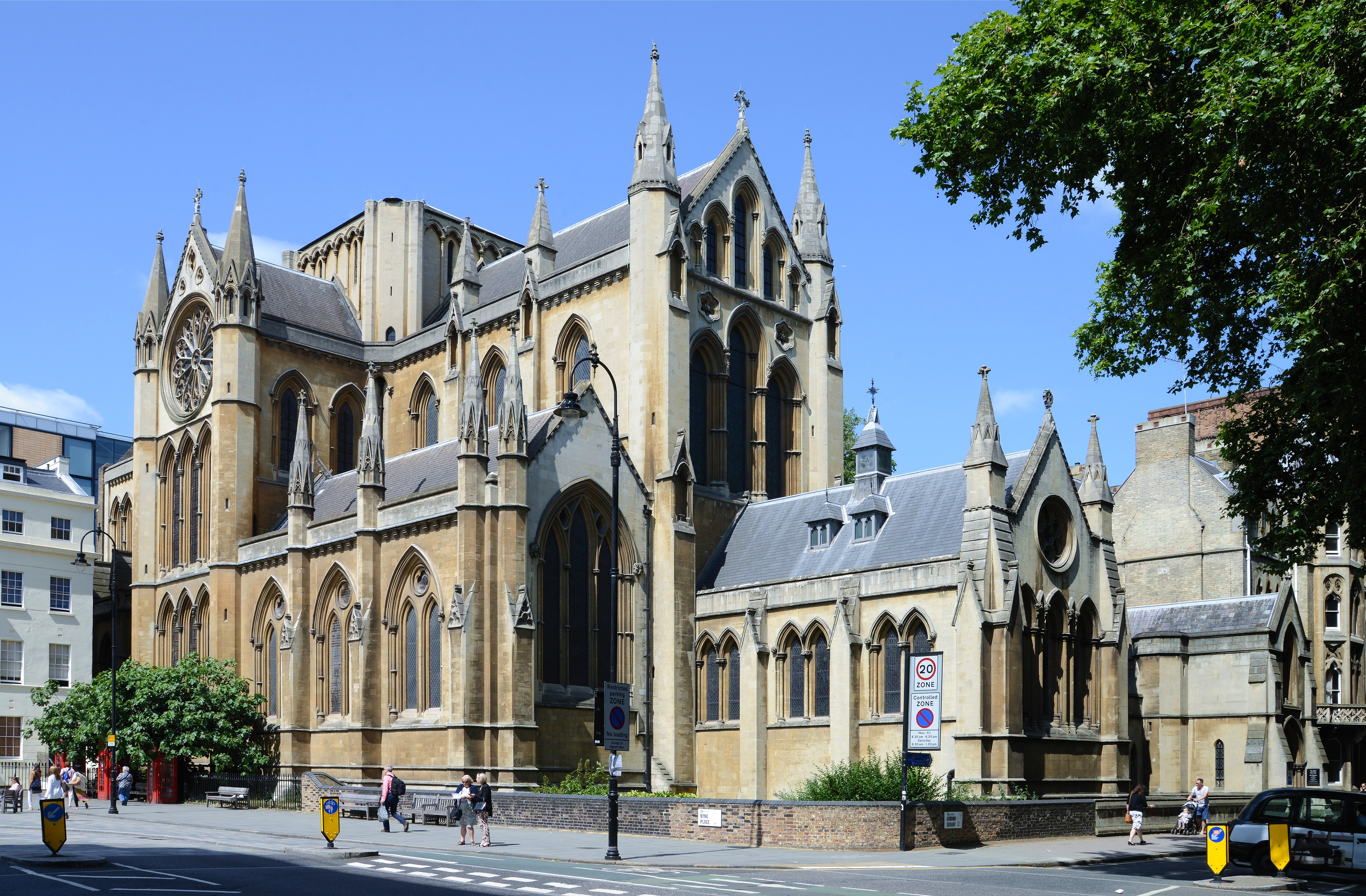
- Church of Christ the King

- Location within Central London
- 51°31′24.5″N 0°7′53.7″W
- Location: London
- Country: England
- Denomination: Catholic Apostolic Church

History
- Dedication: Christ the King
- Dedicated: 25 December 1853

Architecture
- Heritage designation: Grade I listed
- Architect: Raphael Brandon
- Years built: 1850–1854
- Groundbreaking: 27 June 1851
- Completed: 1856

The Church of Christ the King belongs to Catholic Apostolic Church trustees; it is in Gordon Square, Bloomsbury, London. It adjoins Dr Williams's Library and is within sight of University College London. The church is used by the Anglican mission Euston Church for Sunday services and its English Chapel, at its east end, by Forward in Faith for weekday services. It has been a Grade I listed building since 10 June 1954, one of 129 such Christian buildings in London.

== Construction and design ==
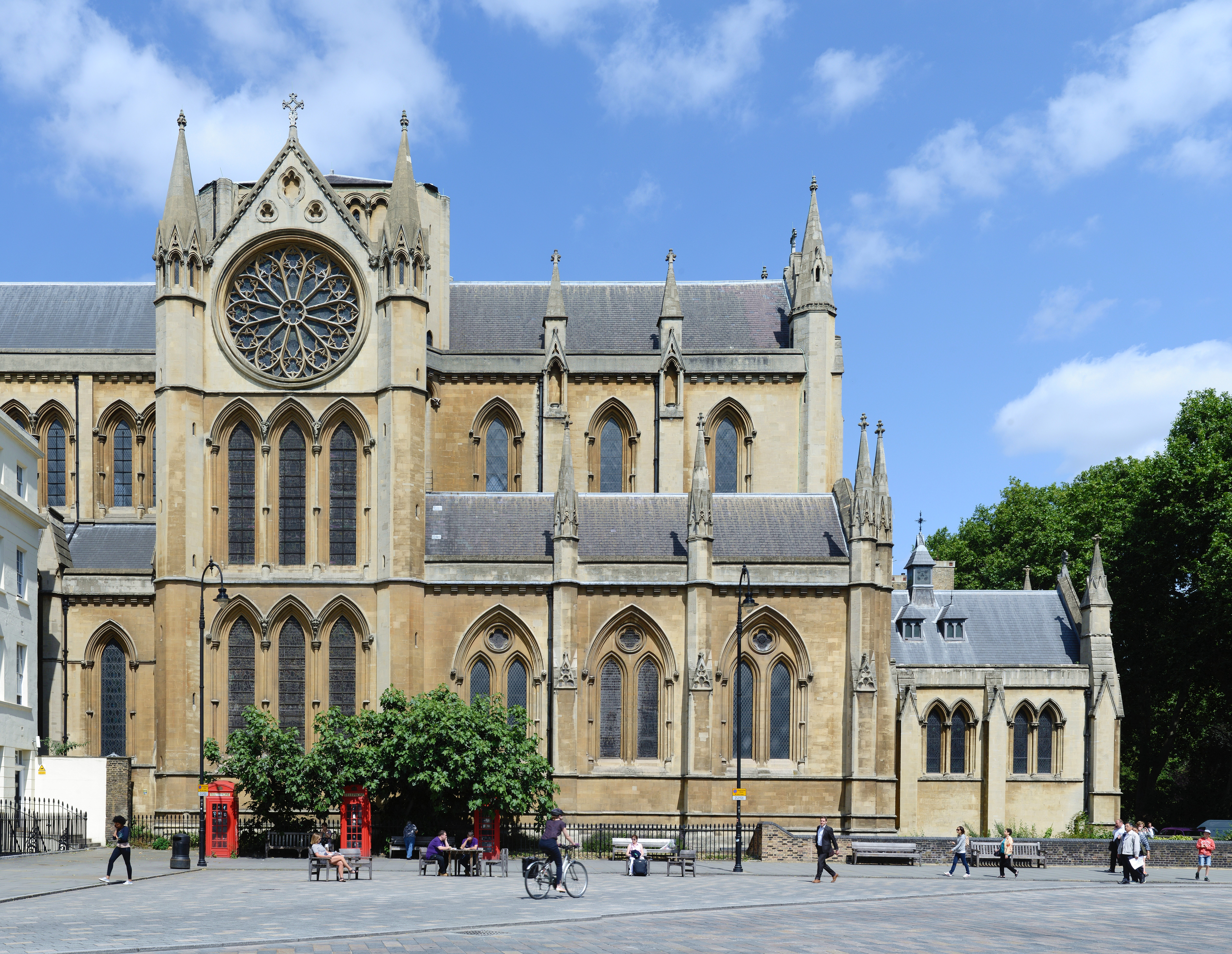
View of the south side of the east end of the Church of Christ the King

Early English Neo-Gothic in style and cruciform in plan, the church was built by Raphael Brandon between 1850 and 1854 (with Brandon's interior designed in 1853) for the Catholic Apostolic Church (also known as "Irvingites"). It is built of Bath stone, with a tiled roof. The structure is incomplete, lacking two bays on its liturgical west side (which prevented the construction of a planned façade – the west end remains unfinished, in brick apart from entrance in stone) and (like Westminster Abbey) a crossing tower (including a 150 ft spire – the tower base that was built has mostly blind arcading). Its cruciform plan is made up of a nave with full triforium and clerestory, side aisles, sanctuary and Lady Chapel. All of the church's exterior corners have octagonal corner turrets with gabled niches and terminating in spires with gablets. The façade has pinnacled buttresses and corbelled parapets.

The main entrance is at the east end, from Gordon Street, through a gabled porch with angle buttresses (with mouldings, a pointed-arch door and a two-light and oculus plate tracery window above the door) which links onto the Lady Chapel via an octagonal turret and two-light room. (There is also a north side entrance approached by a cloister walk from the porch.)

The five-bay nave (only 13 feet lower than that of Westminster Abbey) has a gabled east facade with three large lancet windows below five smaller ones – on the inside, it has a timber hammer beam roof with angels and central bosses of snowflake design, as well as a double-arcaded triforium. It also contains a cathedra for its 'angel' (roughly equivalent to bishop) of the Catholic Apostolic Church.

The crossing is made up of roll-moulded arches on clustered columns. The transepts are gabled, with two layers of three lancets below a rose window. The south transept's windows (the originals) are the most notable – the lancets have Christ in Majesty with ranks of saints, apostles and angels and earth below, whilst its rose window is by Archibald Keightley Nicholson and has a dove in the centre surrounded by musician angels and cherubim and seraphim.

The church's three-bay sanctuary has a roof with stone rib-vaulting and foliated bosses, along with a sanctuary lamp by Augustus Pugin. The three-bay Lady Chapel (formerly the English Chapel) is beyond this sanctuary, separated from it by a screen behind the high altar with open traceried window to the chapel. The chapel itself has a richly painted timber roof and stone angel along with an east facade with arcaded lancet windows below a small rose window and gable, along with gabled and pinnacled buttresses.

Annette Peach, in her entry for Raphael Brandon in the Dictionary of National Biography, writes:

"The Catholic Apostolic Church in Gordon Square, London, was built between 1850 and 1854 and, though reproducing features recorded by the Brandon brothers in their scholarly works, this extremely large church was criticized by a contemporary for its lack of originality of design. Recent scholars, however, have drawn attention to the combination of 13th- and 15th-century Gothic precedents in its design, which offer a tangible record of the Brandon brothers' study of ecclesiastical architecture."

The church was designated a Grade I listed building on 10 June 1954.

In 1853, a fine organ was erected by Gray and Davison. It was a three manuals organ with pedals, containing 13 stops on the Great-organ, 12 stops on the Swell-organ, 10 stops on the Choir-organ and 8 on the pedal. In total there were 6 couplers. A specification of the organ as it now is can be found on the National Pipe Organ Register. One of the first organists was Edmund Hart Turpin. In 1903 a sub bass 16 ft was added to the choir-organ.

== University church ==
From 1963 to 1994, it was known as the University Church of Christ the King and served the Anglican Chaplaincy to the Universities and Colleges of the Diocese of London. In practice, it was a worship centre for students living in the university halls nearby, but was also used occasionally for London-wide events, with a very strong emphasis on music in worship (under the successive musical directorships of Ian Hall, Alan Wilson and Simon Over).

This new role was begun with a morning Eucharist at which the Bishop of London, the Right Reverend Robert Stopford, celebrated and an Evensong with the former Bishop of London, J. W. C. Wand, preaching), both on 6 October 1963. During this period, a Thanksgiving Eucharist was celebrated on 27 November 1988 for the 25th anniversary of this role, with the Right Reverend Michael Marshall preaching and, on 6 December 1983, the memorial service for Nikolaus Pevsner was held here.

The last Chaplaincy Sunday service was held on 28 June 1992, but a weekday Eucharist continued to be celebrated in the English Chapel. The last chaplaincy service was conducted on Ash Wednesday (16 February) 1994 by the Reverend Alan Walker of the University of Westminster; The diocese surrendered its lease on the church to the trustees on 30 June. A popular student venue, the Crypt Café, ran in the basement for several years until that date.

== Euston Church ==
Euston Church, a Church of England Bishop's Mission Order plant from St Helen's Church, Bishopsgate, started meeting in the church from September 2015, with services at 11am, 3pm and 5pm.

== Forward in Faith ==
The Lady Chapel (English Chapel) at the east end of the church is used by the Anglican Forward in Faith movement. Mass is celebrated on each weekday at 12.30 pm.
