= James Callan =

American Catholic priest (1947–2024)

- Born: October 19, 1947; Rochester, New York, U.S.
- Died: December 13, 2024 (aged 77); Rochester, New York, U.S.
- Religion: Roman Catholic
- Ordained: October 4, 1974

James Brady Callan (October 19, 1947 – December 13, 2024) was an American Roman Catholic priest and one of the founders of the Spiritus Christi Community in Rochester, New York.

== Background ==
Callan was born in Rochester, New York, on October 19, 1947. He died there from cancer on December 13, 2024, at the age of 77.

== Excommunication ==
Callan was removed from his post as administrator at Corpus Christi church in Rochester after a number of complaints were made to the Vatican about his church's policies of blessing same-sex unions, inviting non-Catholics to receive communion, having a pastoral associate, Mary Ramerman, dress and act like a priest, and other issues. The Bishop of Rochester, Matthew Clark, reassigned Callan to a community in Elmira, New York. Callan was excommunicated after he began to attend and preside over services at Spiritus Christi, then known as the New Faith community.
