= William Henry Monk =

English organist, organist, composer and music editor (1823–1889)

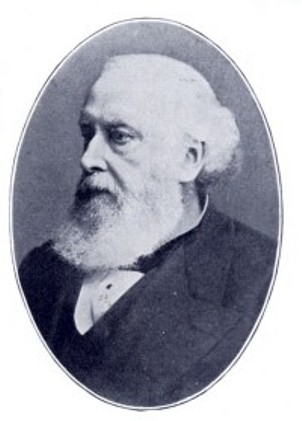
William Henry Monk

William Henry Monk (16 March 1823 – 1 March 1889) was an English organist, Anglican church musician, and music editor who composed popular hymn tunes, including "Eventide", used for the hymn "Abide with Me", and "All Things Bright and Beautiful". He also wrote music for church services and anthems.

== Biography ==
=== Early life ===
William Henry Monk, the son of William and Anna, was born in Brompton, London and baptised in St George's, Hanover Square. His father was a tallow chandler.

Monk studied music under Thomas Adams, J. A. Hamilton, and George Adolphus Griesbach.

== Organist ==
Monk was successively organist and choirmaster at: Eaton Chapel, Pimlico (1841–3); St George's, Albemarle Street (1843–5); St Paul's, Portman Square (1845–7). In 1847 he became the choirmaster at King's College London, adding the role of organist there in 1849. It was during his time at Kings College that he developed an interest in incorporating plainchant into Anglican services, an idea suggested by William Dyce, a King's College professor with whom Monk had much contact. Monk contributed the first articles on the subject to The Parish Choir (1846–51), the journal of the Tractarian 'Society for Promoting Church Music'.

Hymn tunes
"Eventide", by William Henry Monk
An organ performance of "Eventide", best known for its use with the hymn "Abide with Me", performed by Steven Dunlop.

"All Things Bright and Beautiful"
Monk's tune for Cecil Frances Alexander's hymn "All Things Bright and Beautiful"

In 1852 he was appointed organist and choirmaster at the newly opened St Matthias' Church, Stoke Newington where he established the use of plain chant in singing psalms and ensured that the musical programme respected the church calendar. By now, Monk was also arranging hymns, as well as writing his own hymn melodies.

== Editor ==
In 1857, his talents as composer, arranger, and editor were recognized when he was appointed the musical editor of Hymns Ancient and Modern, a volume first published in 1861, containing 273 hymns. After supplements were added (second edition, 1875; later additions or supplements, 1889, 1904, and 1916) it became one of the best-selling hymn books ever produced.

It was for Hymns Ancient and Modern that Monk supplied his famous "Eventide" tune, which is mostly used for the hymn "Abide with Me", as well as several others, including "Gethsemane", "Ascension", and "St Denys". The well-known hymn "God, that madest earth and heaven" by Reginald Heber and Richard Whately, two of the greatest Regency-era clergymen, was set to music in Monk's tune "Nutfield". He was also responsible for the tune "St Matthias" often used for the hymn "Sweet Saviour, bless us ere we go." The late Victorian Anglo-Saxon revivalist tune "St Ethelwald" was put to the words of the Charles Wesley called "Soldiers of Christ, Arise."

== Teacher ==
Monk was Music Master at Chigwell School between 1871 and 1874. In 1874, Monk was appointed professor of vocal studies at King's College (in succession to John Hullah, with whose work of 'Popular Musical Education' he was early associated. He subsequently accepted similar posts at two other prestigious London music schools: the first at the National Training School of Music in 1876, and the second at Bedford College in 1878. Monk remained active in composition throughout his career, writing not only hymn tunes but also anthems and other works. In 1882 Durham University awarded him an honorary Mus. Doc.

== Personal life ==
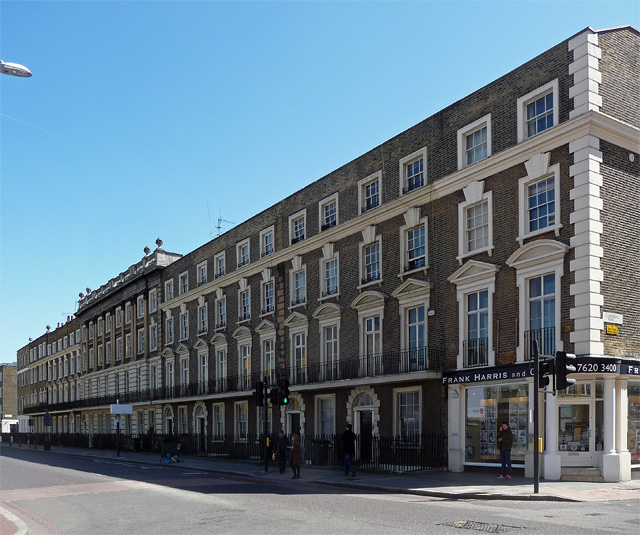
95-123 Stamford Street.

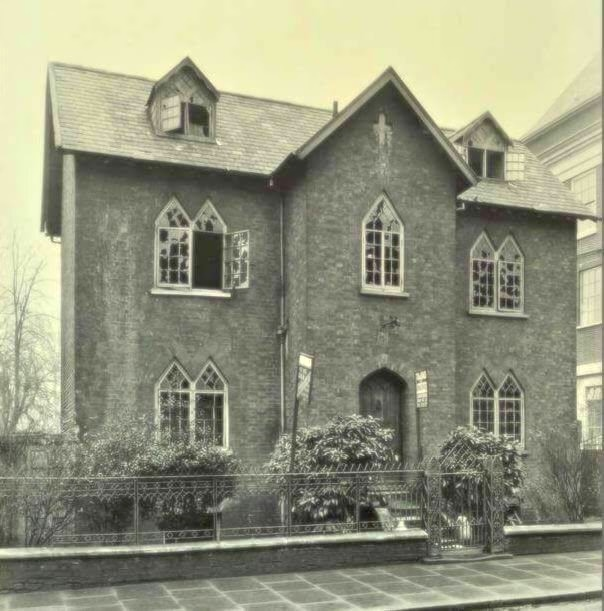
59 Clissold Road.

At the age of twenty-three Monk married Hope Isidora Pillow, the daughter of a master lighterman. In the summer of 1849 a daughter Florence was born and baptised in St John's Church, Waterloo. At the time the Monks were living in Lambeth at 113 Upper Stamford Street. In 1852 Monk's daughter Florence died and, according to Monk's wife, it was this event that precipitated the composition of Monk's famous hymn tune Eventide.

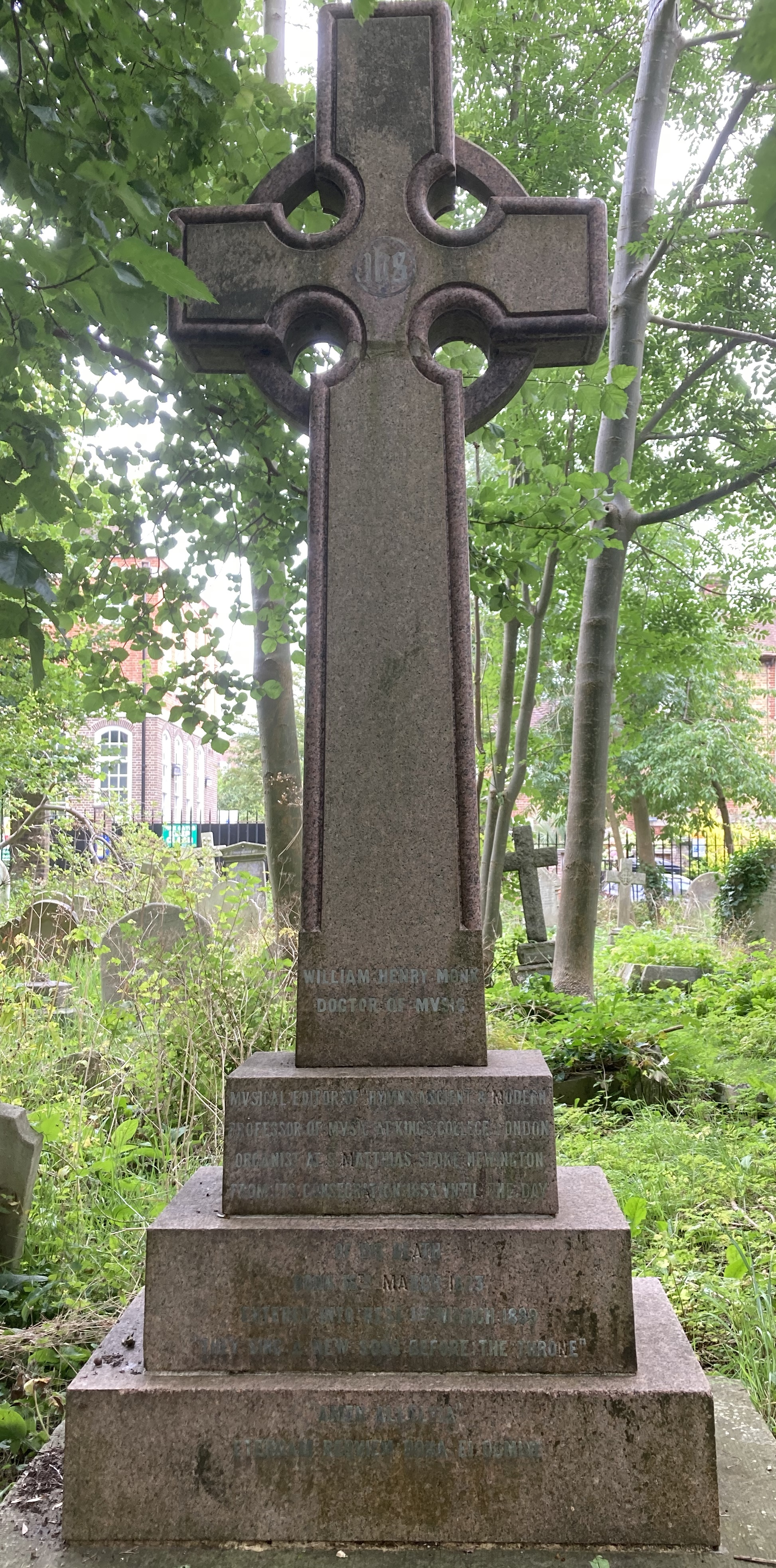
Grave of William Henry Monk in Highgate Cemetery, London

By 1861 Monk and his wife were living in north London, at 59 Clissold Road, Stoke Newington.

Monk died on 1 March 1889 and was buried on the eastern side of Highgate Cemetery in north London.
