= John Bate Cardale =

English religious leader (1802–1877)

John Bate Cardale (1802–1877) was an English religious leader, the first apostle of the Catholic Apostolic Church.

== Life ==
J. B. Cardale was born in London on 7 November 1802, as the eldest of five children to William Cardale (1775-1838) and Mary Ann Bennett. In 1815 he entered Rugby School and in 1818 joined his father's law firm, though he would have preferred to take holy orders. When he qualified as a solicitor on 8 July 1824 his father retired.

Cardale's religious beliefs were evangelical and, like other such believers, he was excited by reports of healings and glossolalia taking place in Glasgow in 1830. He visited Scotland in August and, on his return, reported favourably on the phenomena. In October he opened his home for prayer meetings, where similar "outpouring of the Spirit" took place.

In April 1831 Cardale's wife, Emma Cate nee Plummer, followed by others, began to prophesy and "sing in the Spirit". However, their Anglican priest rejected the authenticity of the gifts and Cardale stopped attending his regular church and began attending the Caledonian Church in Regent Square, where Edward Irving was more sympathetic and permitted similar manifestations to occur in his church. Irving's trustees were not pleased with his management of the church, so they brought the matter before the London presbytery. Cardale acted as Irving's solicitor but was unsuccessful in preventing their expulsion, so finally in October 1832 Irving's congregation moved to a church in Newman Street.

The new church community began to call itself the Catholic Apostolic Church, but the members were often popularly referred to as Irvingites. Cardale was soon proclaimed as an "apostle" in prophecy by members of the congregation. He became the first of 12 such apostles, who were given responsibility for the church's government.

On 14 July 1835 the 12 apostles gathered in Newman Street for the 'Separation of the Apostles'. From 1840 they gathered in the council chamber of a cathedral church that had been newly built for them by Henry Drummond at Albury near Guildford. In 1836 the Christian world was divided by prophecy into twelve regions or "tribes", for each of which an apostle would be responsible. England (or Judah), the seat of apostolic government, was allocated to Cardale, the "Pillar of the Apostles". By then he had retired from active legal work in 1834 and remained in England while his fellow apostles travelled far and wide.

In 1839, when the apostles' authority was questioned by some members of the church, Cardale acted decisively: he recalled his fellow apostles and discontinued the regular meetings of the Council of the Churches, in which critical voices had been raised. The end of the church's prophetical element was underlined by the adoption in 1843 of an elaborate new liturgy. This was mainly the product of Cardale's efforts and it reflected his researches into the Eastern and Catholic offices, as well as the Anglican rites of his upbringing. The church's liturgy was enlarged in 1846 to include the rite of "sealing". In 1851 Cardale published the Readings upon the Liturgy in which he extensively describes the various sources for the liturgy and how they must be conducted. Around 1860 John Bate Cardale and Edward Wilton Eddis participated in the committee that edited the first Catholic Apostolic Hymnal: Hymns for the Use of the Churches which appeared in 1864 for the first time.

For 35 years Cardale ministered to Catholic Apostolic congregations throughout the United Kingdom. When the apostle Henry King-Church died in 1865, Cardale accepted responsibility for Scandinavia and taught himself Danish. In 1867 he worked for a time in Copenhagen.

He died at his home on 18 July 1877 and was buried in Albury churchyard.

J. B. Cardale and his wife Emma had 9 children.
