= Charles Steggall =

British hymn writer and composer

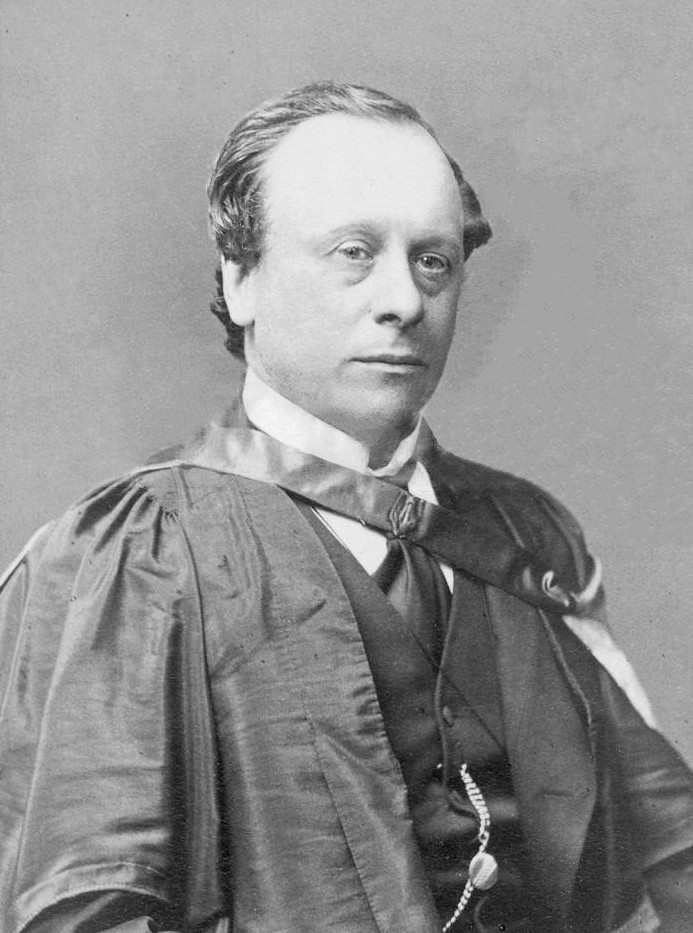
Charles Steggall

Charles H. Steggall (3 June 1826 in London – 7 June 1905 in London) was an English hymnodist and composer.

== Early life ==
The son of R. W. Steggall (of the London-based harness and saddlery maker Whippy, Steggall and Flemming), Charles Steggall was educated at Trinity College, Cambridge and then studied under William Sterndale Bennett at the Royal Academy of Music, where he subsequently became Professor of organ and harmony.

== Later career ==
Steggall worked as an organist for many parishes including: Christ Chapel, Maida Vale; Christ Church, Lancaster Gate and Lincoln's Inn, He was also an examiner for the DMus degree.

As its first Hon Secretary, he played an important role under William Sterndale Bennett to form the Bach Society, forerunner to the Bach Choir in London. He taught organ studies to Helen Johnston (a student at Queen's College, London) whom Sterndale Bennett had chosen to translate the St Matthew Passion from German into English for the first performance in London on 6 April 1854.

He edited the first English edition of Bach's Six Motets (BWV 225–230). He was one of the first twenty-one members of the Royal College of Organists. In 1906 he republished the Complete edition of the Hymns Ancient and Modern. He died in Notting Hill, London.

== Family ==
There were six children, the youngest being composer and organist Reginald Steggall (17 April 1867 — 15 November 1938). Reginald studied organ at the Royal Academy of Music under his father, and composition under George Macfarren and Ebenezer Prout. He became organist of the Church of St. Anne, Soho, and on the death of his father succeeded him as organist and director of the choir to the Honorable Societies of Lincoln's Inn. Reginald Steggall's compositions include works for organ, choral music for the church and large scale orchestral pieces (two symphonies, the Variations on an Original Theme, and the Concertstück for organ and orchestra).
