= Catholic Apostolic Church =

Christian denomination founded in the 1830s

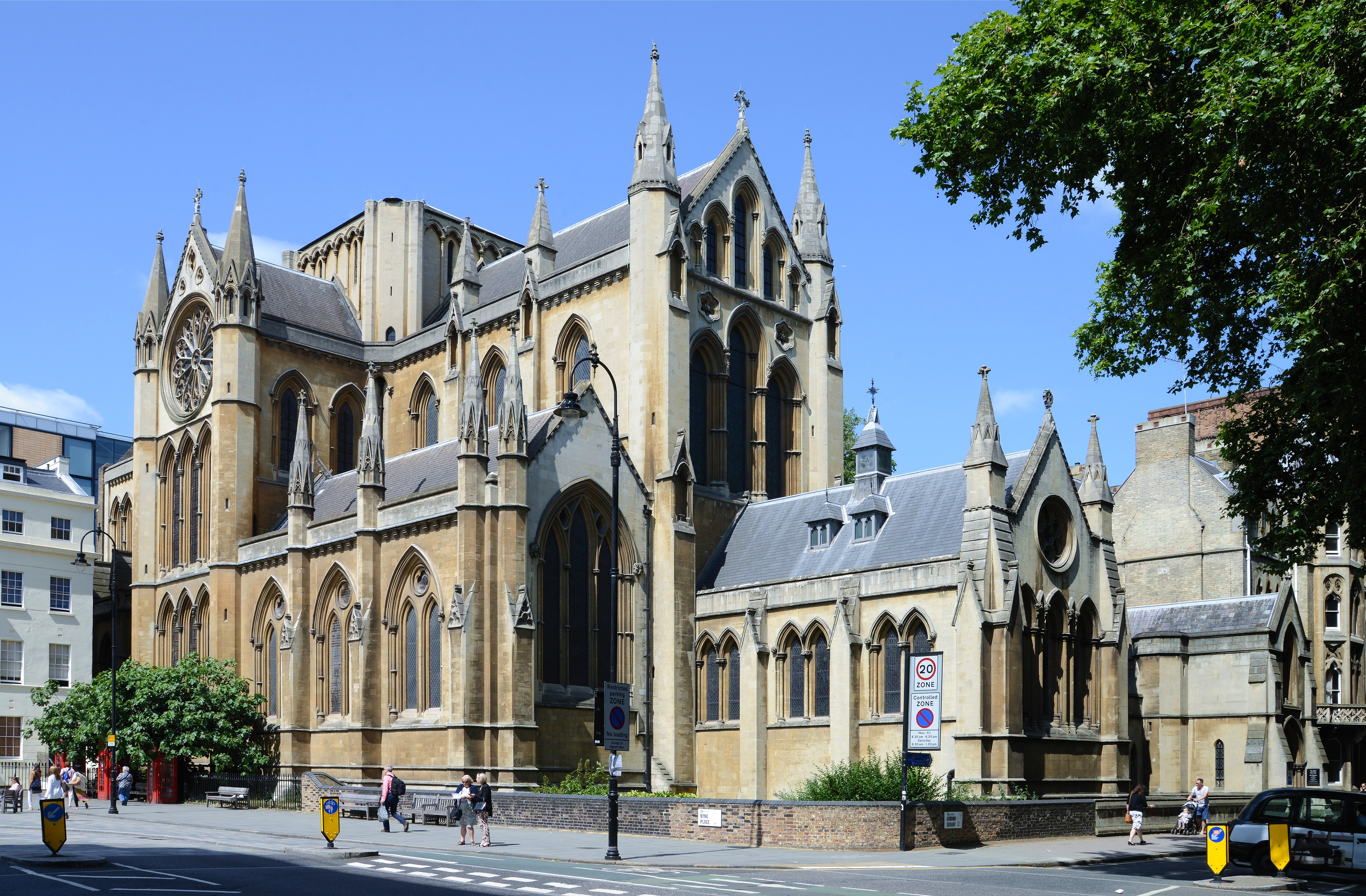
Church of Christ the King, Bloomsbury, which belongs to the trustees of the Catholic Apostolic Church

The Catholic Apostolic Church (CAC), also known as the Irvingian Church or Irvingite Church, is a denomination in the Restorationist branch of Christianity. It originated in London around 1831 and later spread to Germany and the United States. The traditional groups of the Catholic Apostolic Church with the revisionist movement, the character of which include elements of historic liturgies and charismatic gifts, are sometimes referred to as Irvingism or the Irvingian movement after Edward Irving (1792–1834), a clergyman of the Church of Scotland sometimes credited as organising the movement.

The church was organised in 1835 with the fourfold ministry of "apostles, prophets, evangelists, and pastors". The denominations in the tradition of the Catholic Apostolic Church teach "the restoration to the universal church of prophetic gifts by the direct inspiration of the Holy Ghost."

As a result of schism within the Catholic Apostolic Church, other Irvingian Christian denominations emerged, including the Old Apostolic Church, New Apostolic Church, Reformed Old Apostolic Church and United Apostolic Church; of these, the New Apostolic Church is the largest Irvingian Christian denomination today, with 16 million members as of 2008.

Irvingism has elaborate liturgies and teaches three sacraments: Baptism, Holy Communion, and Holy Sealing.

== History ==
=== Edward Irving ===
Edward Irving, also a minister in the Church of Scotland, preached in his church at Regent Square in London on the speedy return of Jesus Christ and the real substance of his human nature.

Irving's relationship to this community was, according to its members, somewhat similar to that of John the Baptist to the early Christian Church. He was the forerunner and prophet of the coming dispensation, not the founder of a new sect; and indeed the only connection which Irving seems to have had with the Catholic Apostolic Church was in fostering spiritual persons who had been driven out of other congregations for the exercise of their spiritual gifts.

Around him, as well as around other congregations of different origins, coalesced persons who had been driven out of other churches, wanting to "exercise their spiritual gifts". Shortly after Irving's trial and deposition (1831), he restarted meetings in a hired hall in London, and much of his original congregation followed him. Having been expelled from the Church of Scotland, Irving took to preaching in the open air in Islington, until a new church was built for him and his followers in Duncan Street, Islington, funded by Duncan Mackenzie of Barnsbury, a former elder of Irving's London church.

Shortly after Irving's trial and deposition (1831), certain persons were, at some meetings held for prayer, designated as "called to be apostles of the Lord" by certain others claiming prophetic gifts.

=== Naming of the apostles ===
In the year 1835, six months after Irving's death, six other people were similarly designated as called to complete the number of the twelve, who were then formally separated, by the pastors of the local congregations to which they belonged, to their higher office in the universal church on 14 July 1835. This separation is understood by the community not as "in any sense being a schism or separation from the one Catholic Church, but a separation to a special work of blessing and intercession on behalf of it." The twelve were afterwards guided to ordain others—twelve prophets, twelve evangelists, and twelve pastors, "sharing equally with them the one Catholic Episcopate," and also seven deacons for administering the temporal affairs of the church catholic.

The names of those twelve apostles included John Bate Cardale, Henry Drummond, Spencer Perceval, Thomas Carlyle, and Duncan Mackenzie.

== Structure and ministries ==
Each congregation was presided over by its "angel" or bishop (who ranks as angel-pastor in the Universal Church); under him are four-and-twenty priests, divided into the four ministries of "elders, prophets, evangelists and pastors," and with these are the deacons, seven of whom regulate the temporal affairs of the church—besides whom there are also "sub-deacons, acolytes, singers, and door-keepers." The understanding is that each elder, with his co-presbyters and deacons, shall have charge of 500 adult communicants in his district; but this has been but partially carried into practice. This is the full constitution of each particular church or congregation as founded by the "restored apostles," each local church thus "reflecting in its government the government of the church catholic by the angel or high priest Jesus Christ, and His forty-eight presbyters in their fourfold ministry (in which apostles and elders always rank first), and under these the deacons of the church catholic."

The priesthood is supported by tithes; it being deemed a duty on the part of all members of the church who receive yearly incomes to offer a tithe of their increase every week, besides the free-will offering for the support of the place of worship, and for the relief of distress. Each local church sends "a tithe of its tithes" to the Temple, by which the ministers of the Universal Church are supported and its administrative expenses defrayed; by these offerings, too, the needs of poorer churches are supplied.

== Liturgy and forms of worship ==
=== Sources of forms of worship ===
For the service of the church a comprehensive book of liturgies and offices was provided by the apostles. It dates from 1842 and is based on the Anglican, Roman and Greek liturgies. Lights, incense, vestments, holy water, chrism, and other adjuncts of worship are in constant use. In 1911, the ceremonial in its completeness could be seen in the church in Gordon Square, London and elsewhere.

The daily worship consists of matins with proposition (or exposition) of the sacrament at 6 a.m., prayers at 9 a.m. and 3 p.m., and vespers with proposition at 5 p.m. On all Sundays and holy days there is a "solemn celebration of the eucharist" at the high altar; on Sundays this is at 10 a.m. On other days low celebrations are held in the side-chapels, which with the chancel in all churches correctly built after apostolic directions are separated or marked off from the nave by open screens with gates. The community has always laid great stress on symbolism, and in the eucharist, while rejecting both transubstantiation and consubstantiation, holds strongly to a real (mystical) presence. It emphasizes also the phenomena of Christian experience and deems miracle and mystery to be of the essence of a spirit-filled church.

The services were published as The Liturgy and other Divine Offices of the Church. Apostle Cardale put together two large volumes of writings about the liturgy, with references to its history and the reasons for operating in the ways defined, which was published under the title Readings on the Liturgy.

The Eucharist, being the memorial sacrifice of Christ, is the central service. The Irvingian Churches teach the real presence of Christ in the Eucharist, though they rejected what they saw as the philosophical explanations of the Roman Catholic doctrine of transubstantiation as well as Lollardist doctrine of consubstantiation.

Some of the music in the Catholic Apostolic Church is composed by Edmund Hart Turpin, former secretary of the Royal College of Organists.

== Sacraments ==
Irvingism teaches three sacraments: Baptism, Holy Communion and Holy Sealing.

== Number of congregations and members ==
In 1911, the CAC claimed to have among its clergy many of the Roman, Anglican and other churches, the orders of those ordained by Greek, Roman and Anglican bishops being recognized by it with the simple confirmation of an "apostolic act." The community had not changed in 1911 in general constitution or doctrine. At the time, it did not publish statistics, and its growth during late years before 1911 is said to have been more marked in the United States and in certain European countries, such as Germany, than in Great Britain. There are nine congregations enumerated in The Religious Life of London (1904).

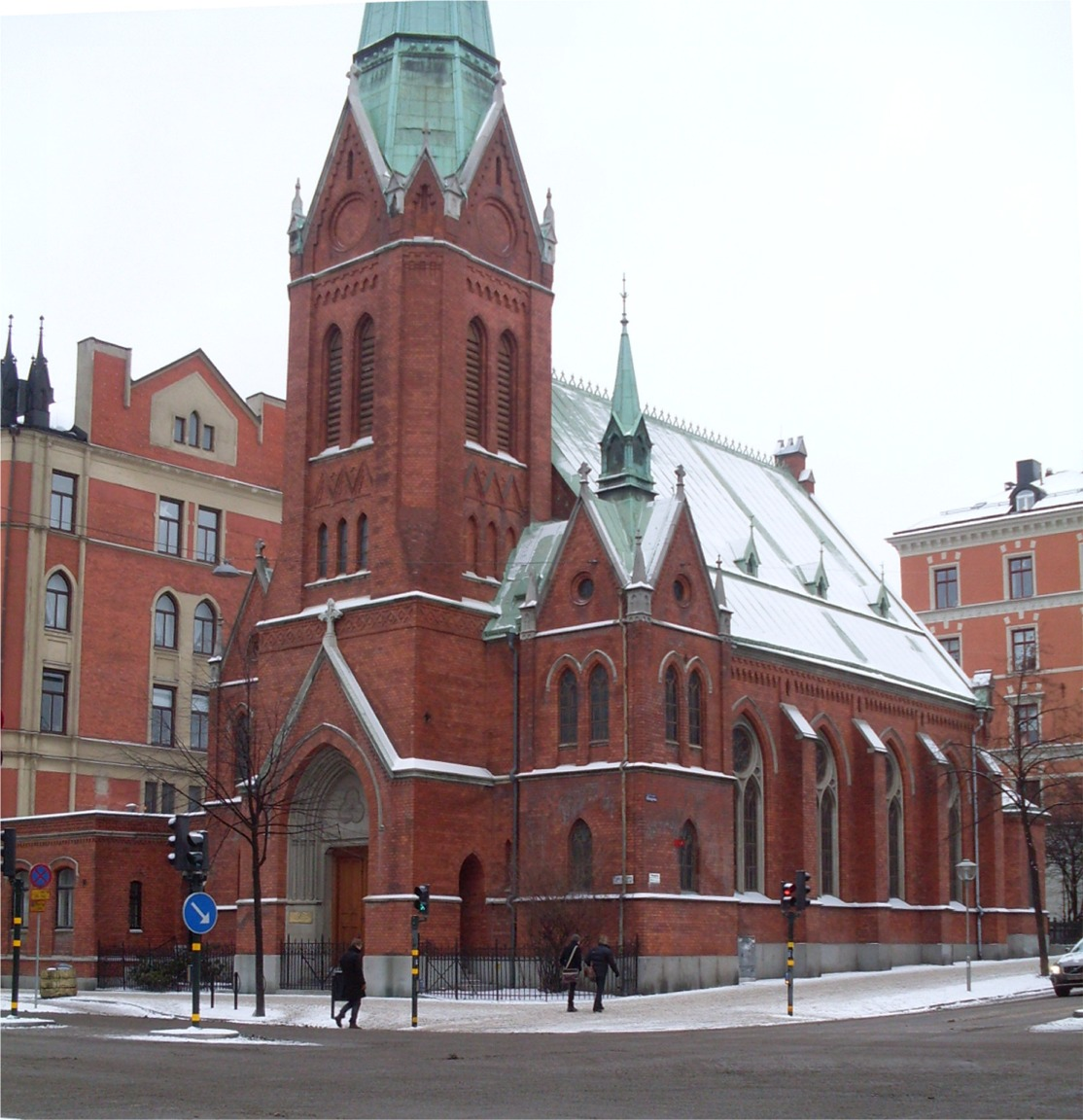
The former Catholic Apostolic church in Stockholm, Sweden, built in 1889–90. Since the 1970s, it has served as a Greek Orthodox church.

In the 21st century, of the principal CAC buildings in London, the Catholic Apostolic Central Church, in Gordon Square, survives and has been let for other religious purposes.

=== Notable members ===
Aside from Irving, notable members include Thomas Carlyle; Edward Wilton Eddis, who contributed to the Catholic Apostolic hymnal; and Edmund Hart Turpin, who contributed much to CAC music.

== New Apostolic Church ==
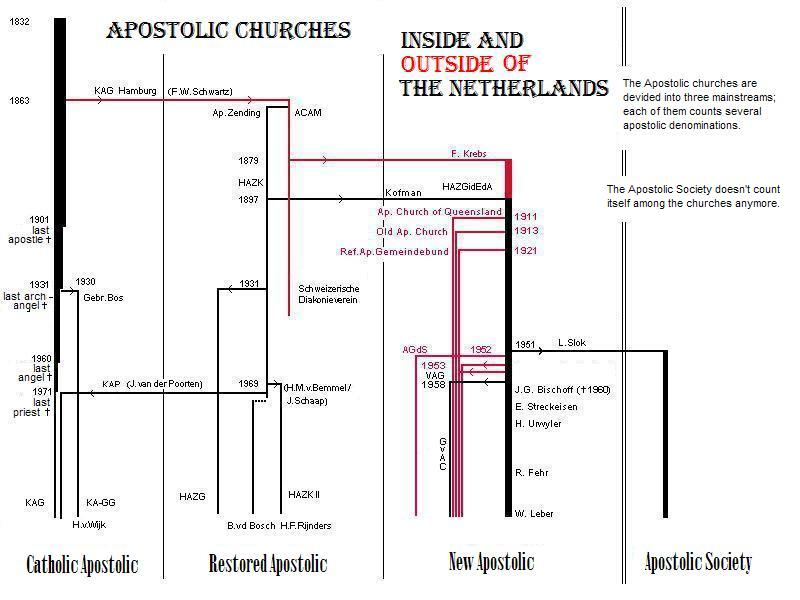
Scheme of several Apostolic churches inside and outside the Netherlands from 1830 until 2005. Click on the image to enlarge.

In the 19th century, the Dutch branch of the Restored Apostolic Mission Church (at first known as Apostolische Zending, since 1893 officially registered as Hersteld Apostolische Zendingkerk (HAZK)) was created. This later became the New Apostolic Church.

== Notable buildings ==
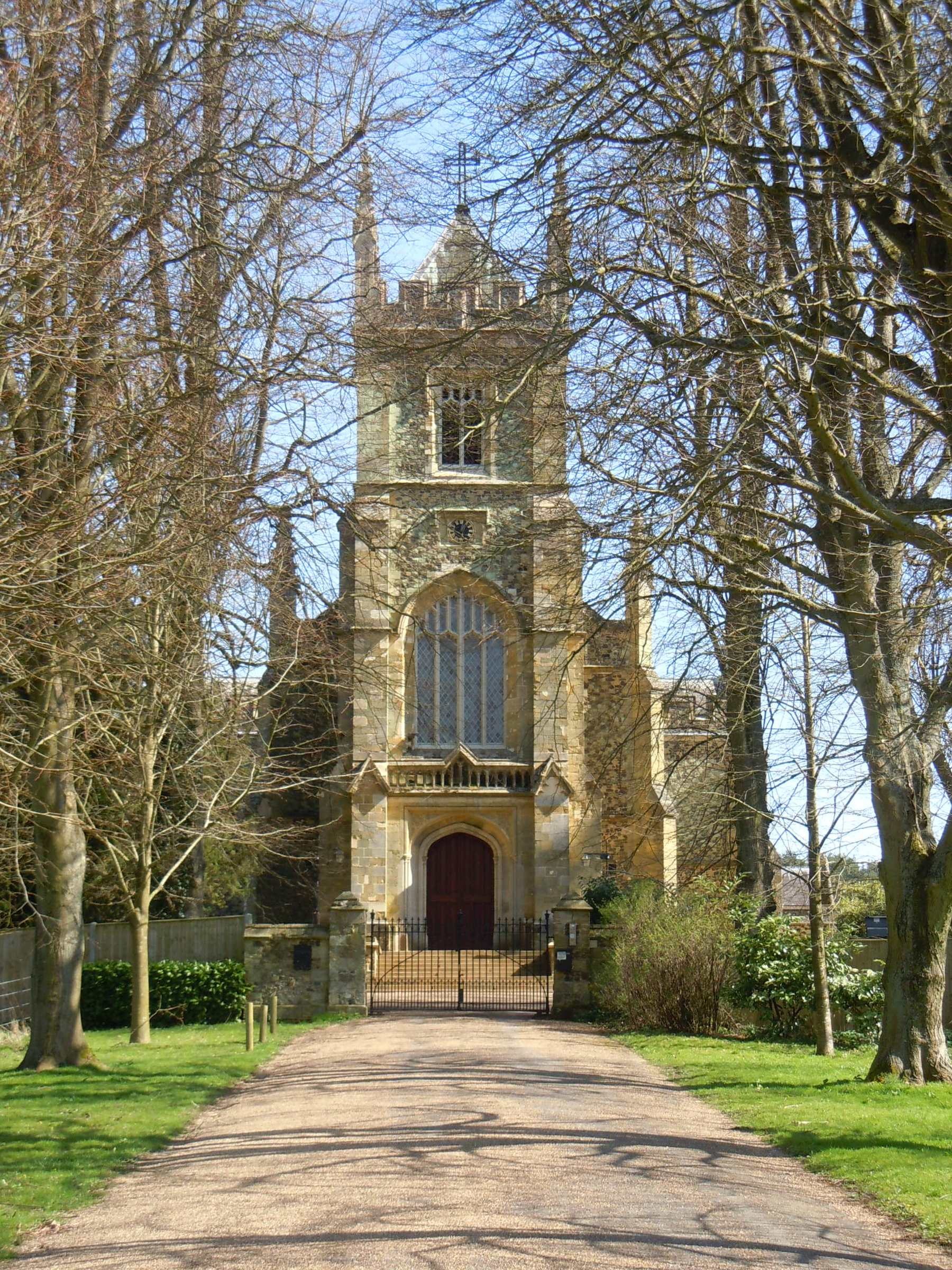
Former Catholic Apostolic Church, Albury Park, Surrey

- The Church of Christ the King, Bloomsbury in Gordon Square, London: a massive early English neo-Gothic building constructed 1850–1854, designed by Raphael Brandon.
- Maida Avenue, Paddington, London: built 1891–1894, designed by John Loughborough Pearson.
- Mansfield Place Church (now the Mansfield Traquair Centre), Edinburgh: a Scottish neo-Romanesque building completed in 1885, designed by Sir Robert Rowand Anderson.

== Shortage of holy order ==
All ministers in the church were ordained by an apostle, or under delegated authority of an apostle. Thus, following the death of the last of the apostles, Francis Valentine Woodhouse, in 1901, the consensus of trustees, who administer the remaining assets, has been that no further ordinations are possible.

== Archives ==
A collection of papers related to the Catholic Apostolic Church, compiled by the Cousland family of Glasgow, is held at the Cadbury Research Library, University of Birmingham.

== See also ==
- Apostolic Church of Queensland, an Australian religious denomination established by H. F. Niemeyer in 1883
