= Ecumenical Catholic Communion =

Independent Old Catholic denomination

- Classification: Christian
- Orientation: Independent Old Catholic
- Polity: Episcopal
- Presiding Bishop: Paul Burson
- Region: United States, Belgium, Netherlands, Poland
- Founder: Peter E. Hickman
- Origin: 2003
- Official website: https://ecumenical-catholics.org/

The Ecumenical Catholic Communion (ECC) is an Independent Old Catholic church based within the United States. Its members understand themselves as following the Catholic tradition without being in communion with the Bishop of Rome.

In 2009, the Ecumenical Anglican Church (EAC), an independent church, joined the ECC. The ECC is a member of the National Council of Churches (NCC).

The Ecumenical Catholic Communion differs from Roman Catholic practice in many ways, such as consecrating married individuals to the episcopacy, ordaining women, and permitting remarriage after divorce.

In 2025, it would have 40 churches and 5,500 members in 4 countries.

== History ==
The Ecumenical Catholic Communion professes that its roots are to be found in the Old Catholic Church and counts the Declaration of Utrecht among its foundational sources although it is not in communion with the Old Catholic Church of Utrecht.

Peter Elder Hickman, founding bishop of the ECC and presiding bishop until 2015, has been key to the evolution of the communion. Originally ordained for the American Baptists, Hickman was drawn to the liturgical elements of the Roman tradition but had difficulties with some elements of the structure and disciplines of Catholicism. Hickman found a compromise between Roman Catholic sacramental practice and the authority of Rome in an Old Catholic church community in East Los Angeles. After being ordained a priest in an Old Catholic church, Hickman saw the potential to start a new community and founded St. Matthew's Church in Orange County at the end of 1985.

Over time, the community of St. Matthew's grew in number and changed locations, worshiping in mortuary and wedding chapels before being able to acquire its own building. A number of former Roman Catholic priests joined St. Matthew's Church and new communities began to be established. In 1995, the St. Matthew's community decided to seek episcopal ordination for Hickman. To this end, he was put forward as a candidate for the episcopacy to the bishops of the Ecumenical Communion of Catholic and Apostolic Churches. In May 1996, Hickman was ordained a bishop by three independent Old Catholic bishops (i.e. not in communion with Utrecht) and, as a result, was considered to be in the apostolic succession. The ECC was formally established as a national ecclesial organization on September 19, 2003.

A number of communities sought affiliation with the St. Matthew's community and then, after 2003, membership of the ECC. The new communities required ordained leadership and this has resulted in a number of ordinations of both women and men. In 1997, Patricia McElroy became the first woman to be ordained a deacon by Bishop Hickman. In 2000, Hickman ordained Kathy McCarthy to the priesthood, the first such ordination for the ECC. In the following year, the high-profile ordination of Mary Ramerman was considered controversial by the Roman Catholic hierarchy but was supported by some who advocate the ordination of women in the Catholic tradition.

In 2011 the EEC expanded to Europe. The Community of the Good Shepherd in Belgium and currently also in the Netherlands and Poland, joined the ECC as well as a parish in Vienna, Austria. Nine communities and missions in Europe are currently part of the Ecumenical Catholic Communion. In 2018 Denise Donato was ordained as the first female bishop in the ECC. and more than 50 communities across 20 states.

Francis Krebs (born December 12, 1946) became the new presiding bishop of the ECC. Krebs was nominated for presiding bishop and then elected to that post at the 2014 synod of the Ecumenical Catholic Communion in Denver, Colorado. He took office on September 18, 2015, replacing Bishop Peter Elder Hickman, the founding bishop and presiding bishop from 2003 to 2015. His commissioning was held at Eden Theological Seminary on September 18, 2015. With his election, the Office of Presiding Bishop moved to St. Louis.

Krebs had grown up as a Roman Catholic, receiving his bachelor's degree from Cardinal Glennon College and continued his seminary training at Kenrick Seminary, both in St. Louis. He was ordained in the Roman Catholic Archdiocese of St. Louis in 1972. Krebs served as a Roman Catholic priest for 18 years as a parish pastor at St. Ann, Pius the Fifth and Sts. Peter & Paul. He left ministry in the Roman Catholic Church in 1990. He worked for a St. Louis-based behavioral health firm as a management consultant. During this time, Krebs met and married his partner. As a married gay man, he could not return to the Roman Catholic priesthood, but Krebs desired to return to priestly ministry.

In 2025, it would have 40 churches and 5,500 members in 4 countries.

== Belief ==
The constitution of the Ecumenical Catholic Communion affirms faith in elements common to other adherents of the Catholic tradition.

The ECC affirms the Declaration of Utrecht (1889) of the Old Catholic Church which rejected papal jurisdiction and papal infallibility, although the ECC does not completely reject the place of the Bishop of Rome, regarding him as first-among-equals, as it claims was the case during the first millennium.

The ECC also have their own "Distinctive Foundational Teachings of the Ecumenical Catholic Communion", which are seen as an application of Gospel teaching to a contemporary context:

- Invitation to the Sacramental Life: The ECC is open to Christians from other denominations participating in the sacramental life of the communion. In contrast, those Catholics in communion with the Bishop of Rome preclude Christians belonging to ecclesiastical communities from participating in sacraments such as the Eucharist.
- Invitation to Co-equal Ministry: While affirming the value of ministry of people whether they are lay or ordained, single or celibate people, the ECC allows the ordination of men and women who are married.
- Invitation to Intimate Commitment: While acknowledging the trauma of divorce, the ECC allows the marriage of people who have been divorced without the process of obtaining an annulment.
- Invitation to follow Conscience: Members of the ECC are encouraged to be guided by their consciences when making ethical decisions concerning issues such as artificial birth control.

=== Marriage ===
The blessings of same-sex unions are posible.

== Governance ==
The Ecumenical Catholic Communion has a synodal model of governance. The synod of the communion consists of the Presiding Bishop in collaboration with the House of Laity, the House of Pastors, and the Episcopal Council. When the synod is not in session, the governance of the communion is carried by the Leadership Council, except where authority is reserved to the presiding bishop, the Episcopal Council, the House of Laity or the House of Pastors. The Leadership Council is a group composed of the Presiding Bishop and an equal number of representatives from each of the House of Laity and House of Pastors. These representatives are normally the elected officers of the houses.

=== Ecumenical Anglican Church ===
Hickman was the only bishop of the communion until late 2009, when the Ecumenical Anglican Church (EAC) joined the ECC. At that stage, Richard Hollingsworth of the Ecumenical Anglican Church also joined the communion, but relinquished juridical authority within the ECC. Should another diocese be established, Hollingsworth would be eligible for election to this role.

=== Council of Bishops ===
The episcopal council is a legislative, administrative and judicial body of the ECC synodal structure that is composed of all active bishops of the communion, and serves as the highest court of appeal and court of review for the entire communion. The presiding bishop serves as the president of the council. The bishops of the ECC serve in specific functions in their own diocesan structures or in a particular region of the communion, as well as serving collegially in the episcopal council.

Members:

- Paul Burson, Presiding Bishop
- Armando Leyva, Diocesan Bishop of California and Suffragan for Hispanic Affairs
- Kedda Keough, Diocesan Bishop, Pacific Northwest
- Denise Donato, ECC Proto-diocese, Auxiliary Bishop, Retired
- Kae Madden, Diocesan Bishop, The Rocky Mountain Region
- Tomasz Puchalski, Reformed Catholic Church in Poland in full communion with the ECC; Bishop for ECC Communities in Belgium and Netherlands
- Peter Hickman, Founding ECC Presiding Bishop 2003-2015, Retired
- Francis Krebs, ECC Presiding Bishop 2015-2022, Retired

== See also ==
- List of Christian denominations § Independent Catholic
