= Jane Laurie Borthwick =

Scottish hymnwriter

Jane Laurie Borthwick (9 April 1813, Edinburgh, Scotland; 7 September 1897, Edinburgh, Scotland) was hymn writer, translator of German hymns and a noble supporter of home and foreign missions. She worked closely with her sister, Sarah Laurie Findlater. She published under the pseudonym: H. L. L. (Hymns from the Land of Luther). Jane Laurie Borthwick is best known for the Hymns from the Land of Luther; her most famous translation today is Be still, my soul and her most known original text is Come, labor on. Like Catherine Winkworth and Frances Elizabeth Cox, she greatly contributed to English-language hymnody by mediating German hymnody.

== Early life ==
Jane Laurie Borthwick was born 9 April 1813 in Edinburgh (Scotland) as a daughter of James Borthwick, insurance manager of the North British Insurance Office. Jane had at least one sister, Sarah (* 26 November 1823, † 25 December 1907, Torquay, England), who married Rev. Eric Findlater, minister of the Free Church of Scotland (1843-1900). The Borthwicks were members of Free Church of Scotland, which separated from the Church of Scotland in 1843.

It was while Jane Borthwick was residing for a time in Switzerland that her attention was drawn by Baron de Diesbach to the study of German hymns. After returning to Scotland, her father suggested that she might translate for him some of the hymns of which she spoke in such high praise, that set her and her sister to translate German hymns.

== Hymn translation and composition ==
Borthwick, who never married, published her earliest translations and numerous poems under the signature "H.L.L." in the Family Treasury, a religious periodical; the Hymns from the Land of Luther supplied these initials. She used this pseudonym as she preferred to preserve her anonymity. A number of the translations and original poems in the Family Treasury were collected and published in the 1857 as Thoughtful Hours. In 1867 an enlarged edition of the Thoughtful Hours appeared.

Together with her sister Sarah, Jane worked several years on translating German hymns and eventually brought out the Hymns From the Land of Luther. The total number of translated hymns was 122: 69 by Jane and the other 53 by Sarah. It was first published in 1853 and republished later several times. The Hymns from the Land of Luther was attributed to H.L.L., a pseudonym. She was apparently quite unhappy when her real identity was revealed by the hymn compiler Charles Rogers in Lyra Britannica, a Collection of British Hymns (1867). Jane and Laurie translated hymns of various German poets like Paul Gerhardt (1607–1676), Ernst Lange (1650–1727), Joachim Neander (1650–1680), Laurentius Laurenti (1660–1722), Benjamin Schmolck (1672–1737), Gerhard Tersteegen (1697–1769), Nicolaus Zinzendorf (1700–1760), Ehrenfried Liebich (1713–1780) and Karl Johann Philipp Spitta (1801–1859). As such they confined themselves mostly to 17th- and 18th-century German pietistic poets. In 1875, while living in Switzerland, Jane Laurie Borthwick produced another book of translations, the Alpine Lyrics. In this book she translated German poems of Meta Heusser-Schweizer. The Alpine Lyrics were incorporated in the 1884 edition of the Hymns from the Land of Luther.

== Missionary work ==
Jane supported a homeless shelter, the Edinburgh House of Refuge. She also supported foreign missions efforts of the Free Church of Scotland, the Church Missionary Society in Singapore, and the Moravian Church (Mission in Labrador). About her missionary activities she wrote Missionary Evenings at Home (1866), Missionary Enterprise in Many Lands; a Book for the Family (1872) and Lives of Great Missionaries (1883). Besides these books on her missionary activities she also wrote books with religious instruction for children: The story of four centuries, sketches of early Church history for youthful readers (1864), Lessons on the Life of Christ for the Little Ones at Home (1871) and Light by the way: a daily Scripture text-book for little children (1879). She died on 7 September 1897 in Edinburgh (Scotland).

== Legacy ==
By their efforts Jane and Sarah contributed greatly to English-language hymnody in the 19th century by mediating German hymnody to Britain like their contemporaries Catherine Winkworth and Frances Cox. The translations in the Hymns from the Land of Luther, which represent relatively a larger proportion of hymns for the Christian life, and a smaller for the Christian year than one finds in Catherine Winkworth, have attained a success as translations and their acceptance in hymnals was only second to Winkworth's. Since the mid-1850s hardly a hymnal in England or America has appeared without containing some of these translations. However, sometimes stanzas were omitted and texts were altered. In more recent years, the hymns seem to be declining in popularity in Britain, as they do appear in the most recent hymnals with the exception of the translations of those by Schlegel (Be Still, my soul!), Zinzendorf and Spitta (How blessed, from the bonds of sin).

== Works ==
Hymns

- And Is the Time Approaching? Archived 27 March 2014 at the Wayback Machine
- Come, Labor On
- Hasten the Time Appointed Archived 28 March 2014 at the Wayback Machine
- Rest, Weary Soul
- Thou Knowest, Lord Archived 28 March 2014 at the Wayback Machine

Translations

- Alleluia, Fairest Morning
- Be Still, My Soul
- Hallelujah! Jesus Lives! Archived 28 March 2014 at the Wayback Machine
- How Blessed, from the Bonds of Sin
- Jesus, still lead on
- Long Hast Thou Wept and Sorrowed
- Lord, Remove the Veil Away Archived 13 January 2015 at the Wayback Machine
- My Jesus, as Thou Wilt

Hymnbooks

- Hymns from the land of Luther: translated from the German (1853 edition), and later also in: 1854, 1857, 1860, 1862, 1869 and 1884.
- Thoughtful hours, Jane Laurie Borthwick (1863 edition), first published in 1857 and later in 1859, 1863 and 1867
- Alpine Lyrics: A Selection from the Poems of Meta Heusser-Schweizer (1875)
- Lyra Christiana: a treasury of sacred poetry, Jane Laurie Borthwick (1888)

Other books and contributions to books and periodicals

- Contributions to the Family Treasury
- Contributions to Pagenstecher's Collection (1864)
- The story of four centuries, sketches of early Church history for youthful readers, Jane Laurie Borthwick (1864)
- Missionary Evenings at Home (1866), Jane Laurie Borthwick
- Lessons on the Life of Christ for the Little Ones at Home (1871), Jane Laurie Borthwick
- Missionary Enterprise in Many Lands; a Book for the Family (1872), Jane Laurie Borthwick
- The souvenir, a daily text-book (1874), Jane Laurie Borthwick
- Rules for daily life, a Scripture text-book (1875), Jane Laurie Borthwick
- Light by the way: a daily Scripture text-book for little children, edited by Jane Laurie Borthwick (1879)
- Lives of Great Missionaries (1883), Jane Laurie Borthwick
