= Jane Eliza Leeson =

English hymnwriter (1808–1881)

English hymnwriter Jane Eliza Leeson published several collections of original and translated hymns, including several for children. Her works include Infant Hymnings and Hymns and Scenes of Childhood, or A Sponsor's Gift.

== Biography ==
Jane Elizabeth Leeson was born in Wilford, England in 1807 or 1808 and was christened on December 18, 1808, at St. Mary's Church in Nottingham. As an adult, Leeson converted to Roman Catholicism. She died in Leamington, Warwickshire on November 18, 1881.

== Career ==
Leeson was a prolific hymnwriter, publishing numerous collections of hymns during her lifetime. She also published translations of hymns from Latin, including a version of "Christ The Lord is Risen Today" by Wipo of Burgundy. Her various writings were nearly all poetical and designed for children. At her own request all her works were first published anonymously. One of her best pieces (included in leading hymnals in England and the U.S.) was, "Saviour! teach me, day by day". Her "Sweet the Lessons Jesus Taught", is characterized as being tender in expression, but it did not have the same popularity as "Saviour! teach me, day by day".

== Selected works ==
=== Collections ===
- Infant Hymnings
- Hymns and Scenes of Childhood, or A Sponsor's Gift (1842)
- The Lady Ella: or, The Story of "Cinderella" in verse (1847)
- Paraphrases and Hymns for Congregational Singing (1853)

=== Original hymns ===
- "Gracious Savior, gentle Shepherd"
- "Loving Shepherd of Thy Sheep"
- "Savior, teach me, day by day"
- "A little child may know"
- "Their hearts shall not be moved"

=== Translated hymns ===
- "O Holy Spirit fount of love" (by Charles Coffin)
- "In the cross of Christ I glory, Towering o'er the wrecks of time" (by John Bowring)
