= William Hiley Bathurst =

Anglican clergyman and hymnist

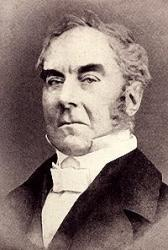
William Hiley Bathurst. 1796–1877

William H. Bathurst (28 August 1796 – 25 November 1877) was an Anglican clergyman and hymnist.

William Hiley Bathurst was the son of the Rt. Hon. Charles Bragge. He was born at Cleve Dale, Mangotsfield, near Bristol on 28 August 1796. His mother was Charlotte Addington and his maternal grandmother's was Hiley, thus his middle name. He married Mary Anne Rhodes, in September 1829 and had 4 children.

Bathurst was educated at Winchester at Christ Church, Oxford, graduating as B. A. in 1818. In 1819 he was ordained deacon and in the following year he was ordained a priest. In 1820 he was presented by his kinsman, Henry, Third Earl of Bathurst, to the Rectory of Barwick-in-Elmet, Yorkshire, and continued there as rector for thirty-two years. In 1852 he resigned the rectory because of conscientious scruples in relation to parts of the baptismal and burial services in the Book of Common Prayer.

He retired into private life and first lived at Darley Dale, near Matlock, Derbyshire, where for eleven years he gave himself to literary pursuits. In May 1863, he came into possession of his father’s estate when his elder brother died without heirs. He moved to Lydney Park soon afterward and died there on 25 November 1877.

His grave is in Lafayette Cemetery in New Orleans.

During his early years of ministry, Bathurst composed hymns and versified a large portion of the psalms. These were published, 1830, in a small volume entitled Psalms and Hymns for Public and Private Use. All but 18 of the 150 psalms and all the 206 hymns in this volume are his.

== Works ==
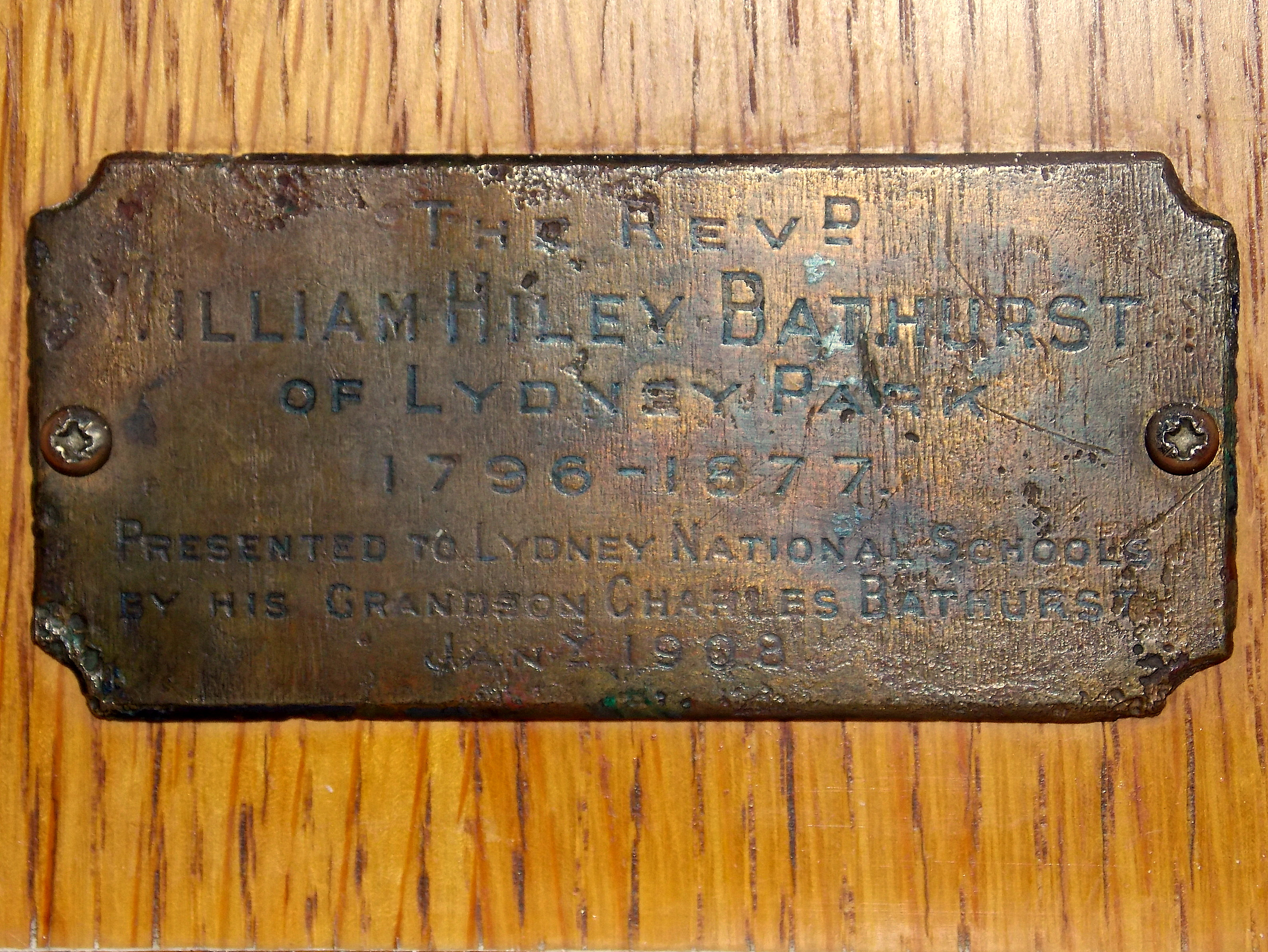
Small plaque, commemorating William Hiley Bathurst.

- The Georgics of Virgil: Translated by W. H. B, 1849
- Metrical Musings; or Thoughts on Sacred Subjects in Verse, 1849

== Hymns ==
- Hark! the distant isles proclaim
- Holy Spirit from on high
- Jesus, thy Church with longing eyes
- Eternal Spirit, by whose power
- O for a faith that will not shrink
- Of for That Flame of Living Fire
- O Saviour, may we never rest, Till Thou art formed within
