= Michael Kraus (minister) =

Canadian clergyman (1908–2003)

Michael Kraus

Michael Kraus (March 26, 1908 – November 16, 2003) was a Canadian entrepreneur and minister in the New Apostolic Church.

== Immigrant ==
Mihail Krauss was the eldest son of a tavern-owning farmer in Meeburg, a village of 950 German-speaking Lutheran Saxons in the Transylvania region of Romania. According to Canadian immigration records, in 1926, at age 18, he boarded the Canadian Pacific ship Minnedosa, and emigrated to Kitchener, Ontario, Canada. He often described his arrival saying, "I had only ten cents in my pocket, didn’t speak a word of English, didn’t know a soul; not even the dogs barked at me." In the 1930s, he worked in a furniture factory by day. After hours he built apartments, beginning a lifelong interest in real estate and construction. At some point his name was changed to Michael Kraus—it is not clear when this change occurred.

== Entrepreneur ==
In 1941, Michael Kraus began importing fabrics to Canada. In 1946 he formed a partnership to manufacture fabric. Initially adopting fabric looms to manufacture carpet, he founded Kraus Carpet Mills in 1959. A daring expansion into fibre extrusion, he founded Strudex Fibres in 1971. By his death in 2003, Kraus companies employed over 900 people at facilities across Canada, in the United States and in Australia.

== Minister ==
Michael Kraus joined the New Apostolic Church in 1932 and was ordained into the ministry one year later. Like other ministers in the New Apostolic Church, he served in a voluntary capacity, initially as an assistant local minister and later in various regional commissions. In 1955 he was ordained as an apostle and, in Zurich on June 21, 1958, he was ordained as a district apostle and national leader of the New Apostolic Church Canada. He traveled extensively, and sent fellow missionaries to spread the Gospel of Jesus Christ and establish the New Apostolic Church in over 70 countries, where church membership grew to over 4 million by his retirement in 1994. He organized the construction of thousands of church buildings in developing countries. His impact on the worldwide growth of the New Apostolic Church was so great, that at his funeral, Chief Apostle Richard Fehr compared it to the missionary work of Paul the Apostle of biblical times.
