= Walter Schmidt (minister) =

Walter Schmidt (21 December 1891 in Neuemühle, Herscheid; 28 February 1981 in Dortmund) was the fourth Chief Apostle of the New Apostolic Church.

== Life ==
He was born on 21 December 1891 in Neuemühle. After the death of Chief Apostle Johann Gottfried Bischoff, he was elected as Chief Apostle by an international apostles' meeting. The New Apostolic Church was in a crisis after the death of Bischoff. The Botschaft of Bischoff was not fulfilled; he died on 7 July 1960. He had told that Jesus will come back, at his lifetime. In the service on 10 July 1960, Walter Schmidt was introduced as the new Chief Apostle and, during that service, the admonition to the members was to answer external critics with silence regarding the Bischoff Prophecy.

He retired on 15 February 1975 and died on 28 February 1981 in Dortmund.

== Ministries ==
- in November 1923: Sub-deacon
- 1925: Priest helper
- 10. March 1929: Priest
- 21. January 1940: District Evangelist
- 25. June 1944: District Elder for the district Dortmund
- 26. May 1945: Bishop
- 29. September 1946: Apostle in the Apostle district Westphalia
- 19. September 1948: District Apostle for Westphalia
- 10 July 1960: Chief Apostle
