= Jean-Luc Schneider =

French New Apostolic Church former chief apostle

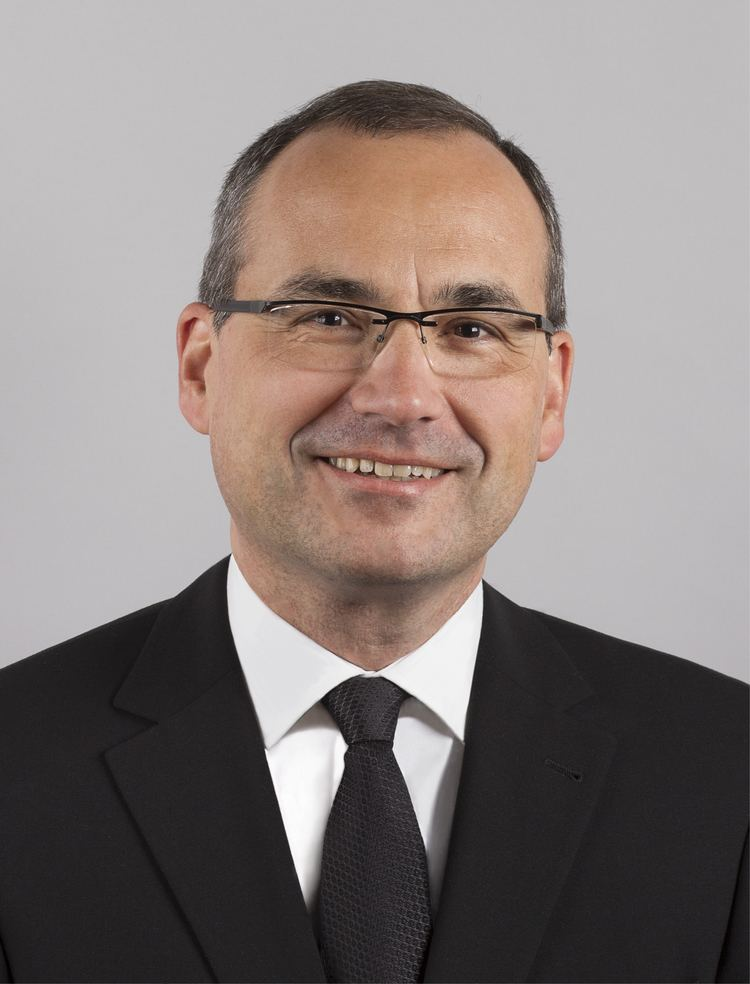
Jean-Luc Schneider

Jean-Luc Schneider (born 18 September 1959) is the former Chief Apostle of the New Apostolic Church. He succeeded Wilhelm Leber on 19 May 2013 to become the ninth Chief Apostle of the New Apostolic Church. He was succeeded by Helge Mutschler on 24 May 2026. Jean-Luc Schneider was the first Frenchman to lead the New Apostolic Church. He served as Chief Apostle from 19 May 2013 until his retirement on 24 May 2026.

== Early life ==
Jean-Luc Schneider was born into a New Apostolic family on 18 September 1959, the eldest of three children. In 1983, he married his wife Pascale and they have two daughters. He and his wife live in a part of metropolitan Strasbourg, North-Eastern France.

As a young man, he studied at a management school. He was employed by a French gas company after the completion of his military service in 1982. After working in various capacities within the company, he was later appointed as manager in the Strategy and Finance department.

== Ministerial timeline ==
- Sub-deacon - 10 January 1980
- Priest - 24 November 1985
- Evangelist - 17 September 1989
- Shepherd - 1 January 1993
- District Elder - 14 November 1993
- Apostle and District Apostle Helper - 22 June 2003
- District Apostle - 26 September 2004
- Chief Apostle Helper - 27 May 2012
- Chief Apostle - 19 May 2013 - 24 May 2026

As a District Elder, he was placed in charge of youth care for France. As a District Apostle, he was responsible for France, Burundi, Democratic Republic of Congo (southeastern part), Tahiti and New Caledonia.

== Road to Retirement ==
Jean-Luc Schneider designated Helge Mutschler as his successor during the Pentecost divine service on 8 June 2025, appointing him as Chief Apostle Helper of the New Apostolic Church.

On 24 May 2026, Schneider retired as Chief Apostle during the Pentecost divine service in Cape Town, South Africa. In the same service, he ordained his designated successor, Helge Mutschler, as the new Chief Apostle of the New Apostolic Church, bringing Schneider’s 13-year term in office to an end.
