= Vechec =

- Municipality
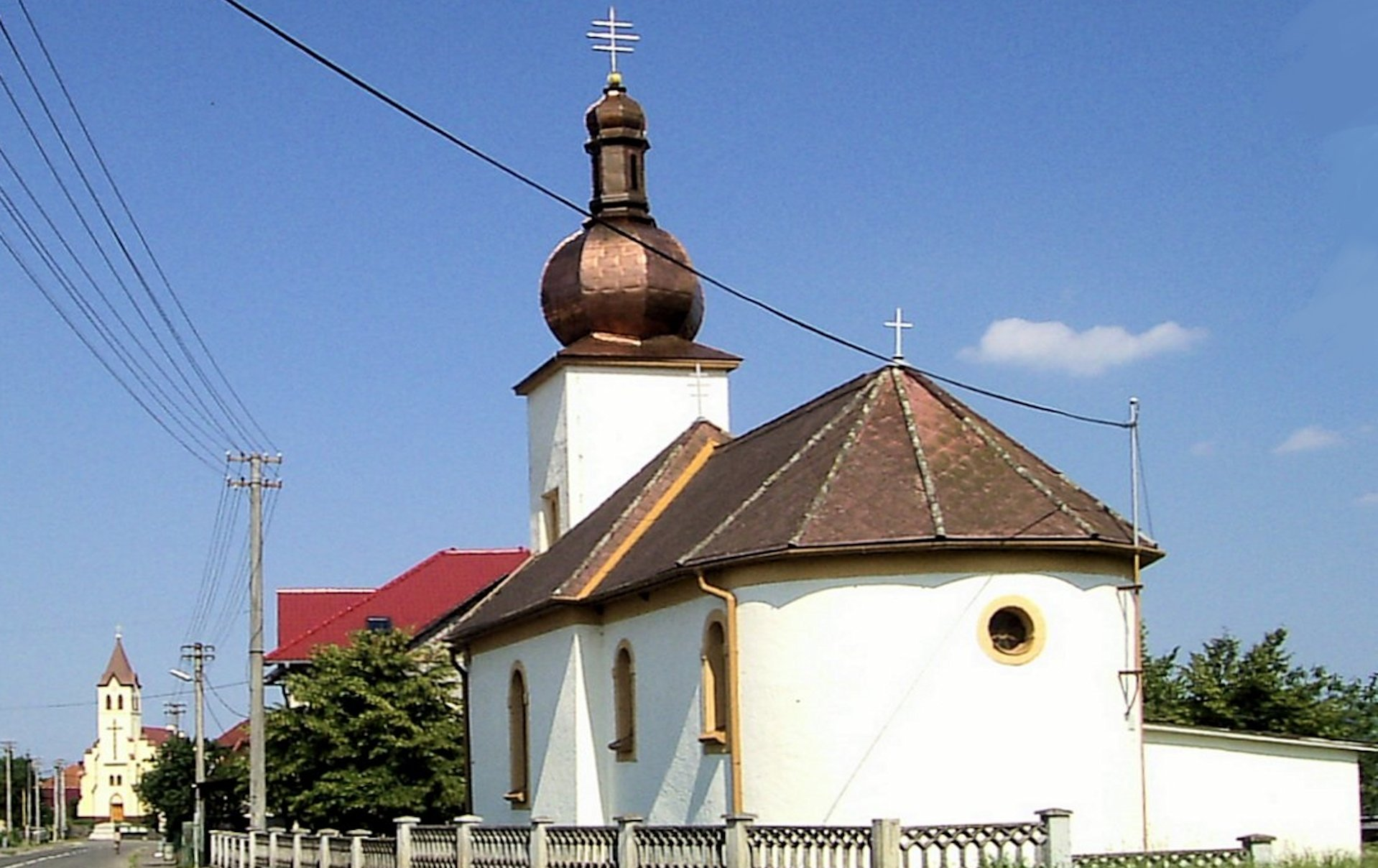

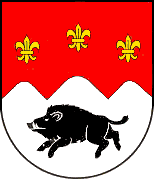
- Flag Coat of arms

- Location of Vechec in the Prešov Region Location of Vechec in Slovakia
- Coordinates: 48.87°N 21.63°E
- Country: Slovakia
- Region: Prešov Region
- District: Vranov nad Topľou District
- First mentioned: 1402

Area
  - Total: 17.27 km^{2} (6.67 sq mi)
- Elevation: 181 m (594 ft)

Population (2025)
  - Total: 3,055
- Time zone: UTC+1 (CET)
  - Summer (DST): UTC+2 (CEST)
- Postal code: 941 2
- Area code: +421 57
- Vehicle registration plate (until 2022): VT
- Website: www.obecvechec.sk

Vechec (Hungarian: Vehéc) is a village and municipality in Vranov nad Topľou District in the Prešov Region of eastern Slovakia.

== History ==
In historical records the village was first mentioned in 1402.

== Geography ==
The municipality lies at an altitude of 181 metres (594 ft) and covers an area of 17.27 km^{2} (6.67 sq mi) (2025).

== Population ==
Population statistic (10 years)
Year	1995	2005	2015	2025
Count	1950	2360	2855	3055
Difference		+21.02%	+20.97%	+7.00%

Population statistic
Year	2024	2025
Count	3025	3055
Difference		+0.99%

It has a population of 3055 people (31 December 2025).

=== Ethnicity ===
Census 2021 (1+ %)
Ethnicity	Number	Fraction
Slovak	2647	93.3%
Romani	1459	51.42%
Not found out	122	4.3%
Total	2837	

In year 2021 was 2837 people by ethnicity 2647 as Slovak, 1459 as Romani, 122 as Not found out, 11 as Czech, 3 as Hungarian, 3 as Other, 2 as Serbian, 2 as Rusyn, 2 as Moravian, 1 as Ukrainian, 1 as Bulgarian and 1 as English.

Note on population: The difference values of population numbers in the table "Population statistic" and in the sections "Ethnicity" & "Religion" is caused by the use of various statistical methods.

=== Religion ===
Census 2021 (1+ %)
Religion	Number	Fraction
Roman Catholic Church	2238	78.89%
Greek Catholic Church	281	9.9%
None	107	3.77%
Jehovah's Witnesses	89	3.14%
Not found out	60	2.11%
Evangelical Church	33	1.16%
Total	2837	

In year 2021 was 2837 people by religion 2238 from Roman Catholic Church, 281 from Greek Catholic Church, 107 from None, 89 from Jehovah's Witnesses, 60 from Not found out, 33 from Evangelical Church, 11 from Christian Congregations in Slovakia, 8 from Other and not ascertained christian church, 4 from United Methodist Church, 2 from Calvinist Church, 1 from Eastern Orthodox Church, 1 from New Apostolic Church, 1 from Seventh-day Adventist Church and 1 from Ad hoc movements.
