= Hans Urwyler =

Hans Urwyler (20 February 1925 - 18 November 1994) was the sixth Chief Apostle (international church president) of the New Apostolic Church.

== Life ==
Hans Urwyler was born into a New Apostolic parents' house in Bern, Switzerland. His maternal ancestors, French Huguenots, had emigrated to Switzerland. His grandfather, Hans Plüss, was one of the first New Apostolic bishops in Switzerland.

He studied to be a machine engineer and after training at the technical school of Biel he joined the automotive industry business of his college friend.

In his youth, he was the choir conductor in his home congregation in Schwarzenburg. There, he had also met his wife Hedi Wenger, whom he married in 1949. They have two sons.

After the sudden death of Chief Apostle Ernst Streckeisen during a service tour in South Africa, Hans Urwyler was elected as Chief Apostle by an international apostles' meeting on 18 November 1978, but he remained leader of the District Church Switzerland until 1 January 1980.

== Term in office ==
During his term in office the membership of the church was growing rapidly. Chief Apostle Urwyler undertook many tours inside Europe and 28 overseas. He ordained more than 180 apostles worldwide. In 1986, he declared that every New Apostolic Christian had personal responsibility for his own faith's existence, and he proved love, helpfulness and sympathy toward believers whose lifestyle outside the currently acceptable limits of the church (e.g. homosexuality, concubinage and divorce) and arranged their permit for the Holy Communion.

In 1985, a major schism occurred in the Wiesbaden area, led by apostle Hermann Gottfried Rockenfelder, who founded the Apostolische Gemeinde Wiesbaden with 1,000 adherents.

After a tour of Africa, he suffered a severe stroke, from which he had not convalesced completely. On 28 August 1987, he ordained Richard Fehr as Chief Apostle Helper, therefore his representative, in Bern hospital and in presence of several European District Apostles. On 3 May 1988, he ordained Richard Fehr as new Chief Apostle, while still in the hospital in Bern and in presence of several District Apostles from Germany, France, Canada and Zambia. Finally, he retired himself.

His sunset years were marked by his severe disease. He died in his domestic circle, after further strokes, in 1994.

== Ministries ==
- 1949 Subdeacon
- 1952 Deacon
- 1953 Priest
- 1964 Shepherd
- 1965 District Evangelist
- 1966 District Elder
- 27 April 1969 Bishop
- 1 January 1976 District Apostle - Church president NAC Switzerland
- 18 November 1978 Chief Apostle
