= Kraus Flooring =

- Industry: Manufacturing
- Founder: Michael Kraus
- Headquarters: Canada
- Website: https://krausflooring.com/

Kraus is a manufacturer of tufted broadloom carpet and distributor of other flooring products.

== History ==
The company was founded in 1959 by Michael Kraus.

Headquartered in Waterloo, Ontario, Canada, Kraus has manufacturing facilities in Waterloo, Ontario, Canada, in Dalton, Georgia, USA and in Southport, Queensland, Australia as well as distribution sites across Canada and the United States.

Kraus is a private company with over 900 employees, and is ranked among North America's ten largest flooring companies.
