= Wilhelm Leber =

German mathematician

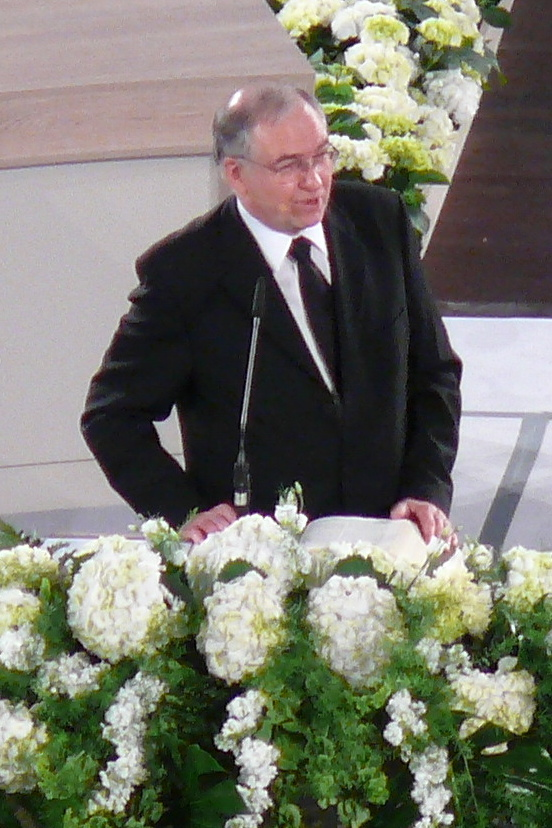

Wilhelm Leber (born 20 July 1947) is a German mathematician and formerly chief apostle in the New Apostolic Church.

== Life ==
Wilhelm Leber was born in Herford in Westphalia. In 1975 he earned his doctorate in mathematics at the Goethe University Frankfurt with a dissertation entitled Konvergenzbegriffe für lineare Operatoren und Stabilitätsaussagen. After earning his degree, he began working at the University of Hamburg.

== Church life ==
In 1990 Wilhelm Leber was ordained to the ministry of Apostle in the New Apostolic Church. When in 1992 his predecessor retired, he was ordained as a District Apostle and given charge of the regional churches in Bremen and Hamburg, and in 1994 also the church of Mecklenburg.

On 15 May 2005, he received the ministry of Chief Apostle of the New Apostolic Church, succeeding Richard Fehr.

On 19 May 2013, he was succeeded as Chief Apostle by Jean-Luc Schneider.
