= Chief Apostle =

Position in the New Apostolic Church

The Chief Apostle is the highest man-made minister in the New Apostolic Church, and has existed since 1896.

== History ==
Former Chief Apostles:

| Name | Birth-Death | Birthplace | Place of Death | Working Period |
| Friedrich Krebs | 1832–1905 | Elend (Harz) (Germany) | Braunschweig (Germany) | 1895–1905 |
| Hermann Niehaus | 1848–1932 | Steinhagen (Germany) | Quelle (Germany) | 1905–1930 |
| Johann Gottfried Bischoff | 1871–1960 | Unter-Mossau (Germany) | Karlsruhe (Germany) | 1930–1960 |
| Walter Schmidt | 1891–1981 | Neuemühle (Germany) | Dortmund (Germany) | 1960–1975 |
| Ernst Streckeisen | 1905–1978 | St. Gallen (Switzerland) | Cape Town (South Africa) | 1975–1978 |
| Hans Urwyler | 1925–1994 | Spiegel (Switzerland) | Bern (Switzerland) | 1978–1988 |
| Richard Fehr | 1938–2013 | Flaach (Switzerland) | Switzerland | 1988–2005 |
| Wilhelm Leber | 1947– | Herford (Germany) | -- | 2005–2013 |
| Jean-Luc Schneider | 1959– | Strasbourg (France) | -- | 2013–2026 |
| Helge Mutschler | 1974– | Tübingen (Germany) | -- | 2026– |

== Function ==
The function of the Chief Apostle is to lead the New Apostolic Church. On questions about the faith of New Apostolic Church members, he has the highest authority. Together with the district apostles he determines the policy of the church.

The Chief Apostle can ordain new apostles or retire them.

One of the most interesting Chief Apostles was J.G. Bischoff: at Christmas in 1950 he declared his "Botschaft" ("message"). This teaching announced that he would not die before Jesus Christ's return, during which the chosen people will be taken into His kingdom (the First Resurrection). In 1954 this teaching became official dogma. Those ministers, especially the apostles, who did not preach this message lost their positions and were excommunicated from the New Apostolic Church. The most important "victim" of this policy was Peter Kuhlen, the ordained successor to J.G. Bischoff. When Chief Apostle Bischoff died in 1960, his dogma about Christ's return had not been fulfilled. In 2013, Chief Apostle Wilhelm Leber made a statement in which the position of the Church is reviewed and provides that the "message" represented a personal position of Apostle Bischoff.

The various communities and congregations which evolved out of these conflicts in different countries (Australia, Europe, South-Africa) gathered in 1956 to form the United Apostolic Church.

== Sources ==
- Wikipedia Germany
