= Johann Gottfried Bischoff =

Johann Gottfried Bischoff Chief Apostle
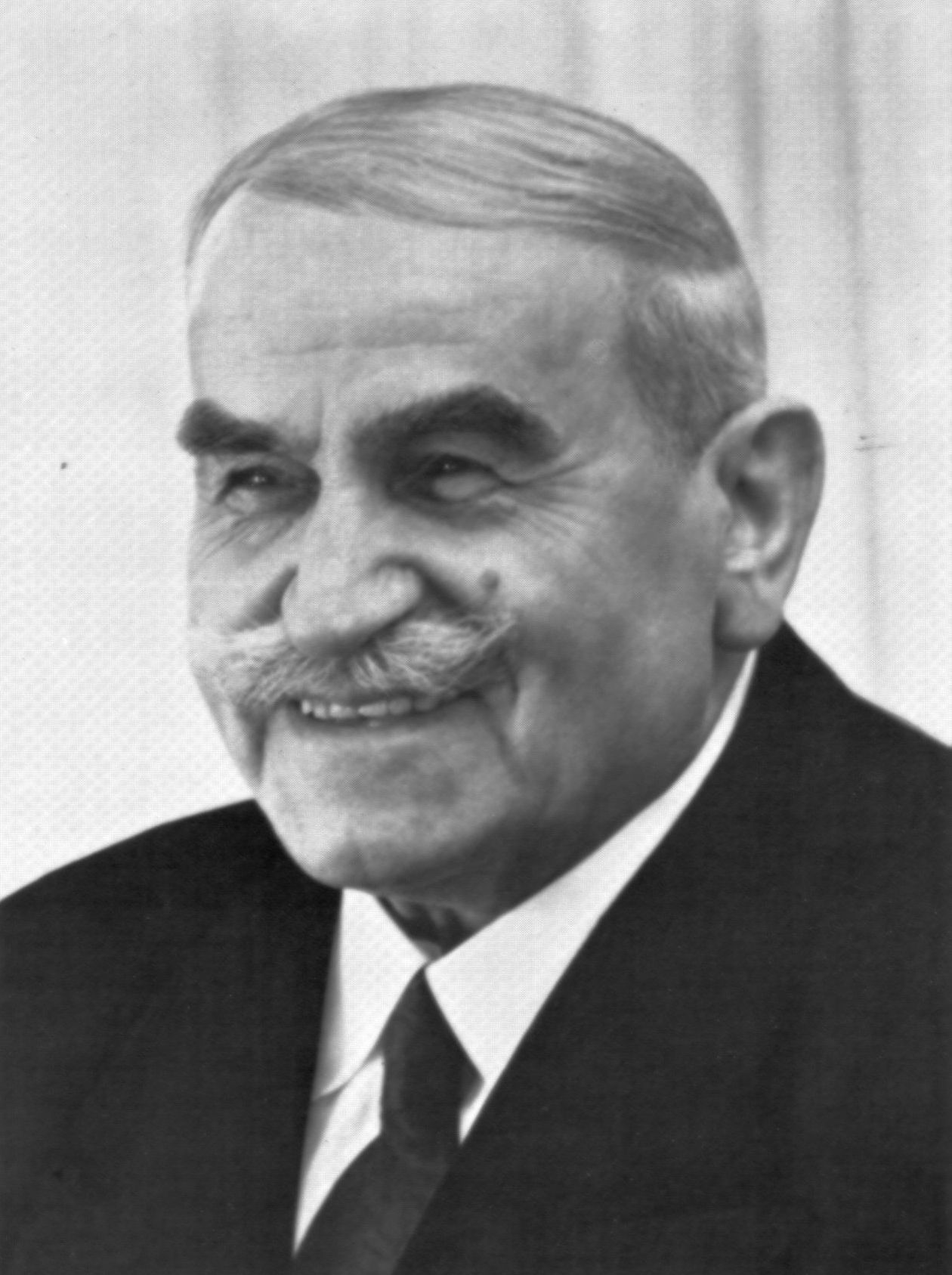

Personal life
- Born: Johann Gottfried Bischoff; 2 January 1871 Unter-Mossau, Odenwald
- Died: 6 July 1960 (aged 89) Karlsruhe
- Spouse: Margarethe Bischoff (née Engel)
- Notable work(s): Questions and Answers
- Known for: Botschaft

Religious life
- Religion: Christianity
- Denomination: New Apostolic Church
- Website: nak.org

Johann Gottfried Bischoff (2 January 1871 – 6 July 1960) was a German Christian leader, Chief Apostle of the New Apostolic Church from his ordination in 1930 until 1960, time of his death.

His leadership featured several controversies. Bischoff was an ardent follower of Adolf Hitler. He often expressed racist and antisemitic views on his writings, particularly on the official magazine of the Church, Unsere Familie. Argentine historian Aurelio Nicolella mentions that Bischoff even entertained the idea of turning his Church into the state religion of the Third Reich.

On Christmas Day 1951 he delivered his infamous Botschaft (message), where he stated that Jesus Christ would fulfill his long-awaited Second Coming before his passing, claiming "the Lord will come again during my lifetime. I am the last, and there is no one after me." For a short while it would be fixed as a Church dogma. After his death, when it became evident for the faithful that Christ would not return any time soon, a significant degree of members began to leave the Church.

== Books ==
- Questions and Answers (Catechism)

== Bibliography ==
=== German ===
- Peter Kuhlen: Ereignisse in der Neuapostolischen Kirche die zur Gründung der Apostolischen Gemeinde geführt haben Eigenverlag, o. J. vermutlich um 1955, o. ISBN
- Manifest über die Zustände und Tendenzen in der Neuapostolischen Gemeinde ohne Autor, Eigenverlag / Schweiz, o. J., o. ISBN
- Herbert Schmidt: Die Wahrheit, Eigenverlag, o. J. vermutlich 1960er Jahre, o. ISBN
- Kurt Hutten: Seher – Grübler – Enthusiasten; 1982
- Karl E. Siegel: Die Botschaft des J. G. Bischoff: Eine kritische Auseinandersetzung mit einer der Endzeitbotschaften Lachesis 1994, ISBN 978-3-980407-60-1
- Susanne Scheibler: Johann Gottfried Bischoff Friedrich Bischoff Verlag Frankfurt, Ausgabe 1997, o. ISBN
- Helmut Obst: Apostel und Propheten der Neuzeit Vandenhoeck & Ruprecht 2000, 4. Auflage, ISBN 3-525-55439-7
- Netzwerk Apostolische Geschichte: Kirche auf dem Weg – die apostolischen Gemeinschaften im Verlauf des 20. Jahrhunderts. (mit Beitrag zur Botschaft des J.G. Bischoff von M. Koch) Bielefeld 2010, ISBN 978-3-939291-06-0
- Rudolf J. Stiegelmeyer: Das tragische Erbe des J.G. Bischoff: Die Botschaft wird 60, Books on Demand 2011, ISBN 978-3844809992
