= Richard Fehr =

Chief Apostle of the New Apostelic Church

Richard Fehr (15 July 1939 – 30 June 2013) was the seventh Chief Apostle (international church president) of the New Apostolic Church from 22 May 1988 to 15 May 2005.

== Life ==
Richard Fehr originally worked as a typesetter and married his wife on 8 September 1960. They had one son.

=== Term in office ===
Date	Position gained
15 November 1961	Subdeacon
11 November 1962	Deacon
18 August 1963	Priest
30 May 1971	Evangelist and congregation chief
12 April 1973	District Elder
18 July 1976	Bishop
25 May 1980	Apostle
7 June 1981	District Apostle of the Switzerland district
22 May 1988	Chief Apostle
15 May 2005	Retirement

He was ordained Chief Apostle by his predecessor Hans Urwyler at his bedside in the hospital. Because of the severe disease which made Chief Apostle Hans Urwyler unfit for service in July 1987, he entrusted Richard Fehr with his substitution and ordained him Chief Apostle Helper on 28 August 1987. On 3 May 1988, Fehr was ordained Chief Apostle by the very ill Urwyler. Fehr officially assumed this office on 22 May 1988 in Fellbach, Germany.

Fehr later ordained Wilhelm Leber his successor on 15 May 2005 in Fellbach and officially asked him for his own retirement.

=== Health deterioration and death ===
Since the end of this mandate, he started to experience some health problems. In 2010 he suffered a stroke, which resulted in partial paralysis. After a short time of rehabilitation he progressed a little, in words of Leber.

Finally, he died on the evening of 30 June 2013.
