= New Apostolic Church =

Church that split from the Catholic Apostolic Church

New Apostolic Church

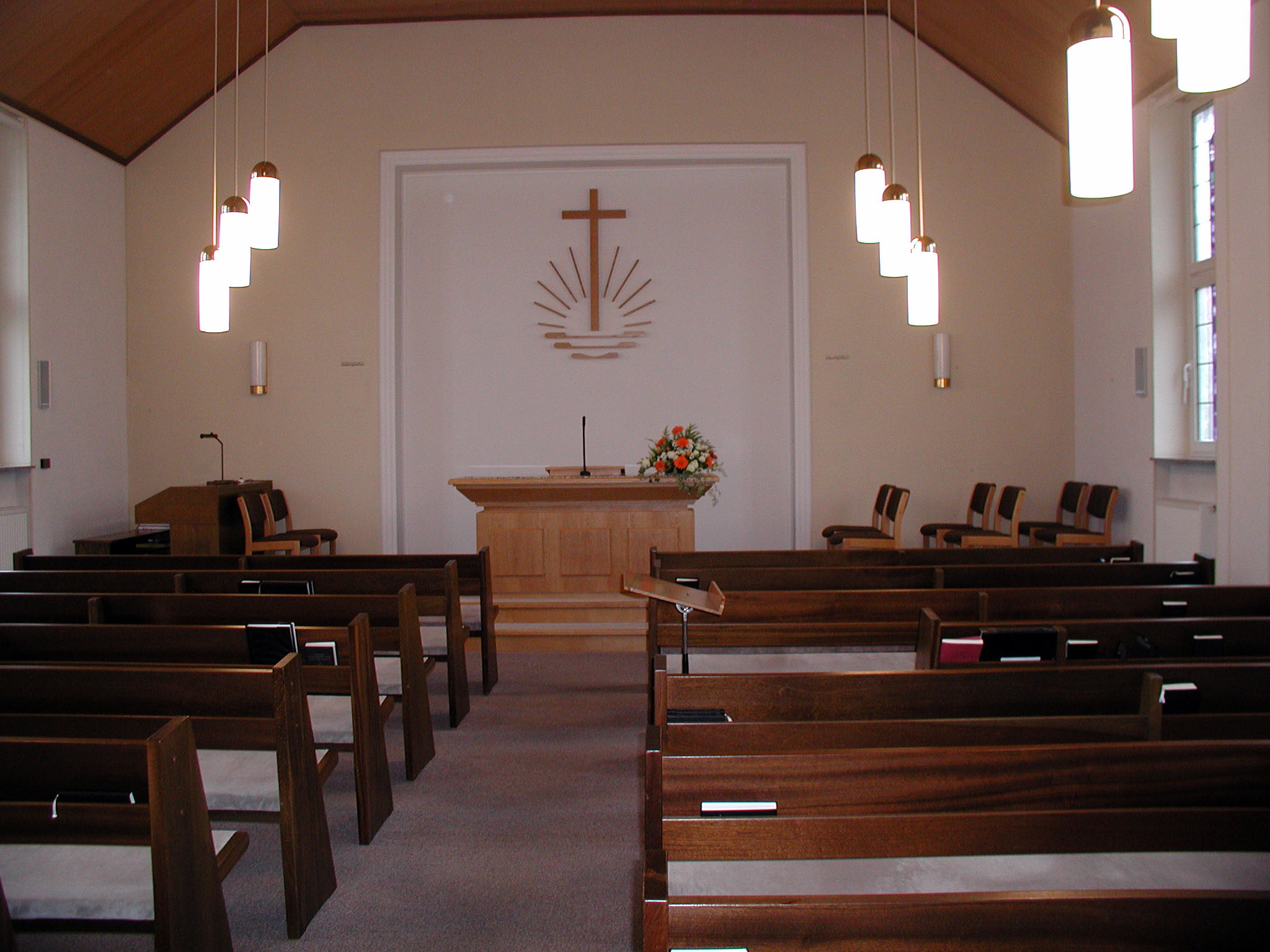
- New Apostolic church hall with emblem
- Classification: Protestant
- Orientation: Irvingian
- Theology: Restorationist
- Polity: Apostolic Hierarchical
- Leader: Chief Apostle Helge Mutschler
- Distinct fellowships: International Apostles' Meeting; District Apostles' Meeting; Project Groups: -Faith Questions -Ecumenism -Music -Communication -Youth; Committee for special affairs and others
- Associations: Consortium of Christian Churches, Germany and Switzerland
- Region: 181 nations, divided into 18 District Apostle areas, Int. headquarters: Zurich
- Origin: 1863; Hamburg, Germany
- Branched from: Catholic Apostolic Church
- Separations: Restored Apostolic Mission Church, Old Apostolic Church, United Apostolic Church,
- Congregations: 59,816 (01/01/2016)
- Members: 8,923,420 (01/01/2016)
- Ministers: 256,812 (01/01/2016)
- Aid organization: NAK karitativ, Germany
- Official website: nak.org

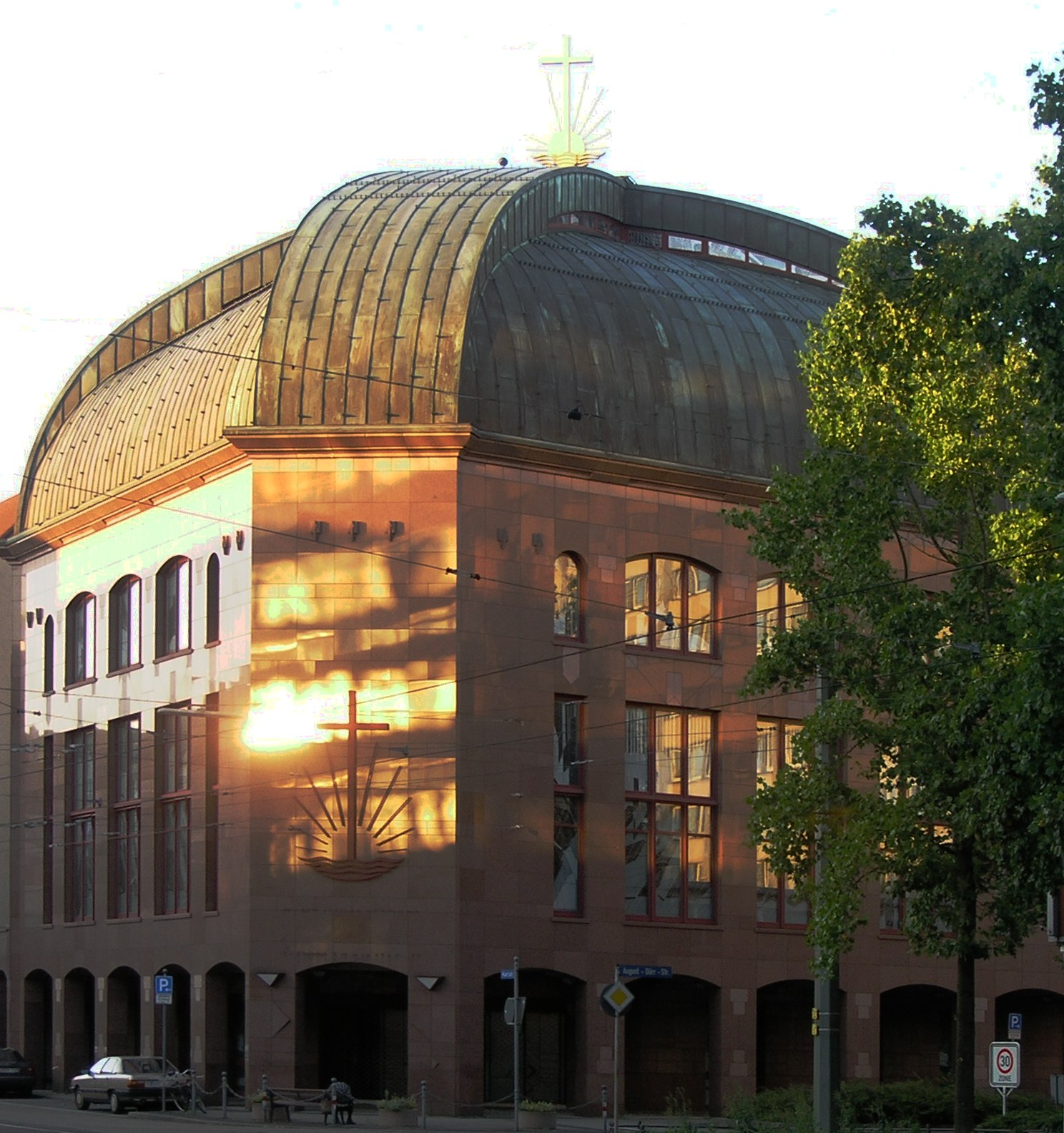
Churches with emblem (Karlsruhe, Karlstraße)

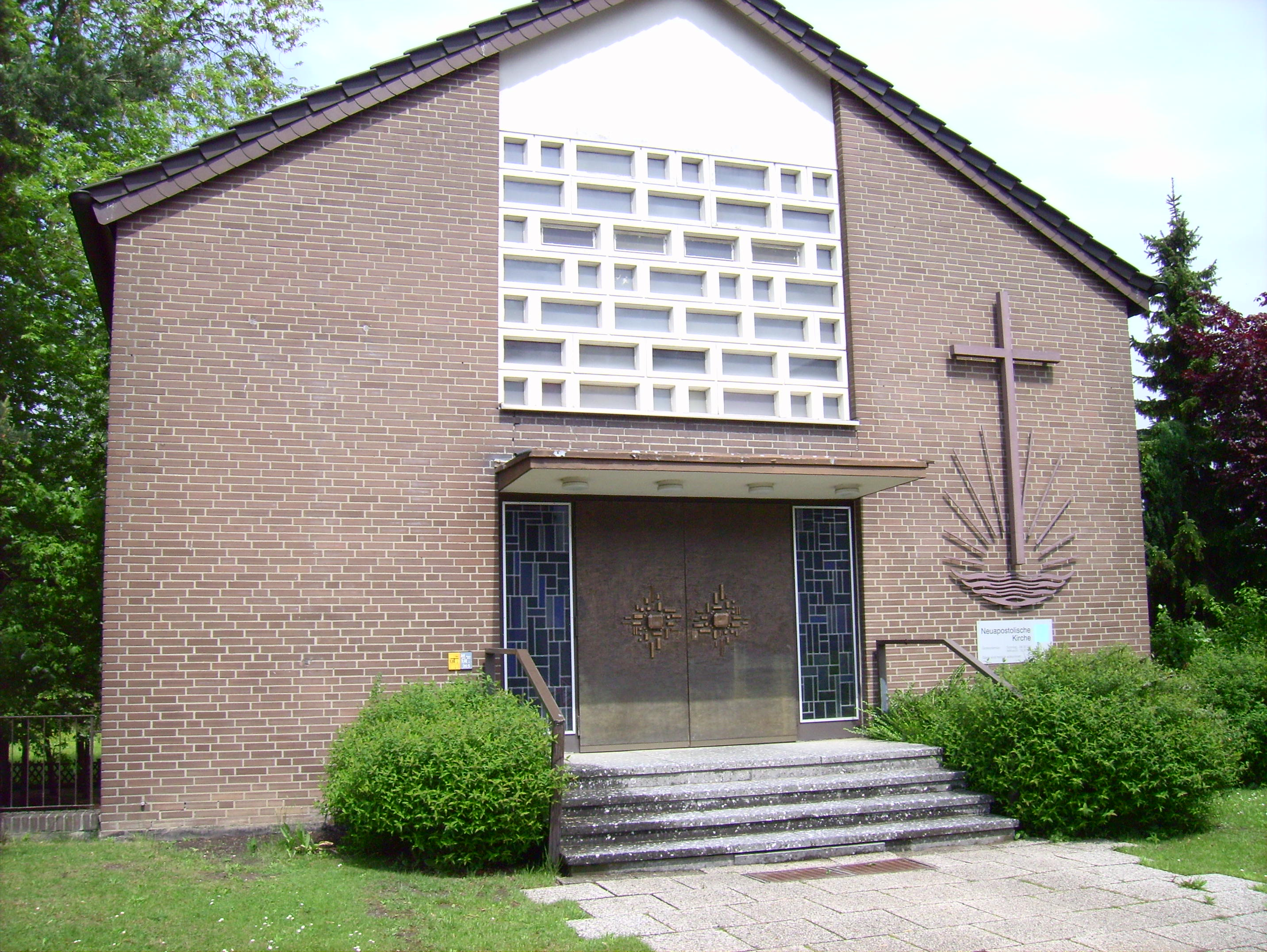
New Apostolic Church in Dortmund-Lanstrop

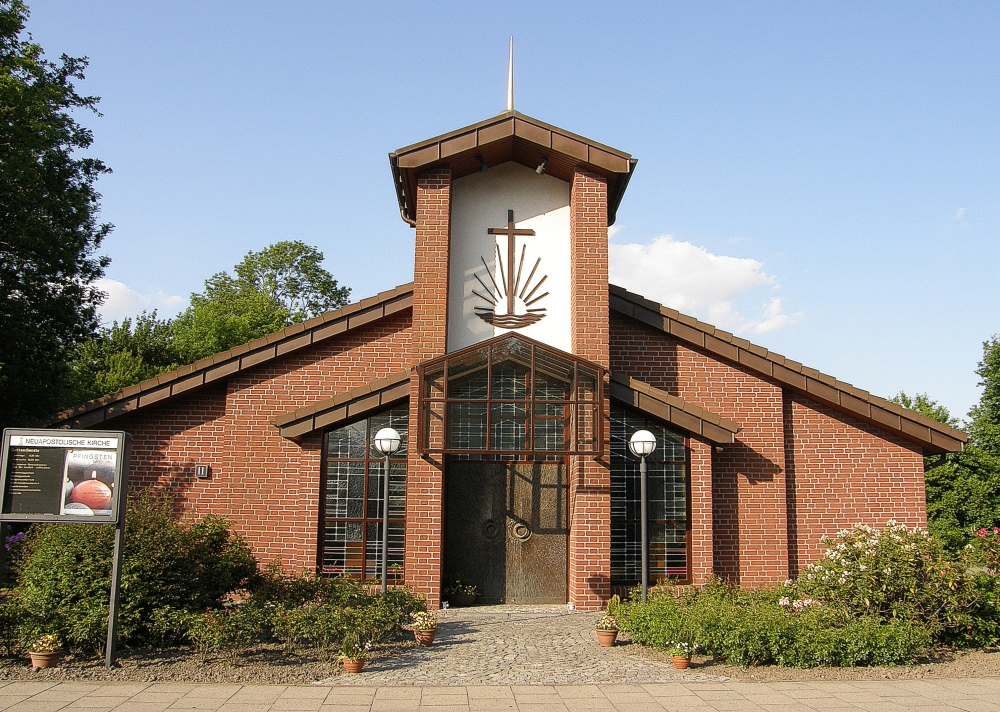
New Apostolic Church in Otterndorf

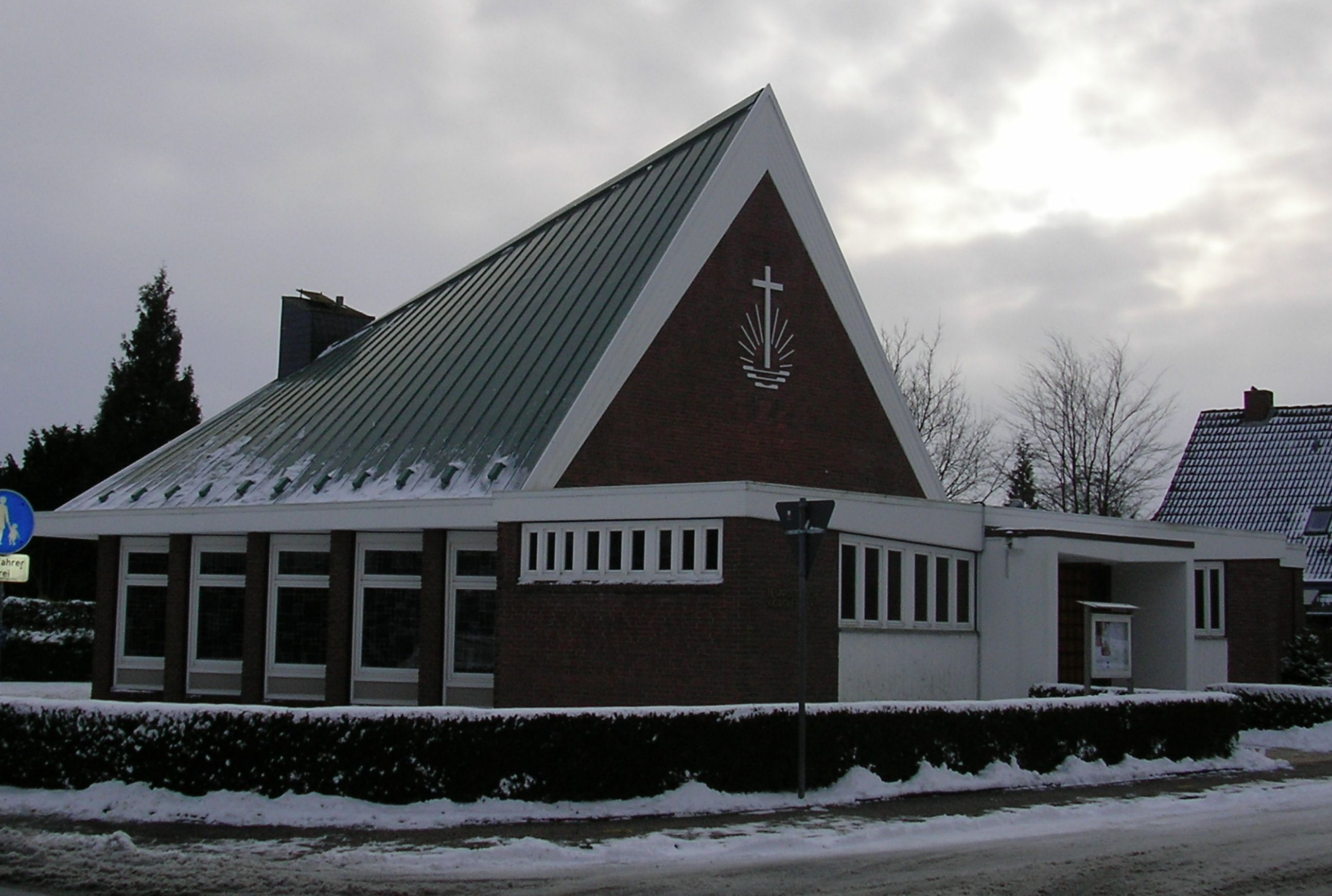
New Apostolic Church in Wittmund

The New Apostolic Church (NAC) is a Christian church of the Irvingian tradition. Its origins are in 1863, when some members of a newly formed group of apostles settled in Germany to freely continue its practices to teach and baptize. The split left the Catholic Apostolic Church on one side and the Hamburg congregation on the other.

The church has existed since 1863 in Germany and since 1897 in the Netherlands. It came about from the schism in Hamburg in 1863, when it separated from the Catholic Apostolic Church, which itself started in the 1830s as a renewal movement in, among others, the Anglican Church and Church of Scotland.

The Second Coming of Christ is at the forefront of the New Apostolic doctrines. Most of its doctrines are akin to mainstream Christianity and, especially its liturgy, to Protestantism, whereas its hierarchy and organisation could be compared with the Catholic Church. It is a central church in the Irvingian orientation of Christianity.

The church considers itself to be the re-established continuation of the Early Church and that its leaders are the successors of the twelve apostles. This doctrine resembles Restorationism in some aspects.

The official abbreviation in English-speaking countries is NAC (for New Apostolic Church), whereas it is NAK in German (Neuapostolische Kirche), ENA in French (Église Néo Apostolique), and INA in Portuguese (Igreja Nova Apostólica) and Spanish (Iglesia Nueva Apostólica).

== History ==
=== The Catholic Apostolic Church ===
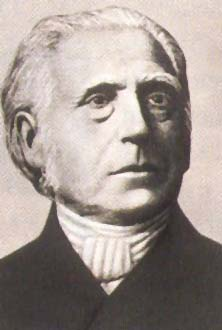
Apostle Schwartz later in life

In England in 1832, John Bate Cardale was called, through prophecies, as the first apostle of the second sending. Eleven more men from various Christian denominations, social positions and religious training were called to the newly founded apostle ministry from then until 1835. After a long period of combined preparation, these apostles started to travel around the world, preaching the gospel of Jesus Christ. The main point of their gospel was that the Church had deviated from its origins; only through restoring the Universal Church to its perfect state could the return of Christ be ensured. They were convinced that the restoration of the apostles' ministry was necessary to achieve that perfect condition.

After the death of three apostles in 1855, the apostolate declared that there was no reason to call new apostles. During a meeting at Albury in 1860, the German Prophet Heinrich Geyer called two evangelists to be apostles. After deliberation, the apostles rejected this calling, explained the callings of substitutes as coadjutors to the remaining apostles and affirmed that no further callings to the apostolate would be accepted.

=== Break from the Catholic Apostolic Church ===
Later, on 10 October 1862, while traveling with the Apostle Woodhouse in Königsberg, the Prophet Geyer called Rudolf Rosochaki to be an apostle while staying in his home. As callings in private were no longer accepted by the English apostles, Rosochaki was told to wait patiently until God would confirm his calling in the presence of witnesses. In December, Geyer informed Angel (Bishop) F. W. Schwartz, of the Hamburg congregation, that Rosochaki had been called and Angel Schwartz then invited both of them to Hamburg. In the afternoon service of 4 January 1863, Schwartz asked the men to describe what had happened and Schwartz, along with most of the congregation, accepted this calling of Rosochaki to the apostolate.

A few days later Apostle Rosochaki became doubtful of the divine origin of his calling as an apostle after meeting with some of the other apostles. Eventually, he subordinated himself once more to Apostle Woodhouse and left the schismatics, returning to the Catholic Apostolic congregation on 17 January 1863. On 26 January 1863 Angel Schwartz met with Apostle Woodhouse and Archangel Rothe in Berlin and expressed his belief in the need to continue the apostle ministry. Therefore, on 6 February 1863 Apostle Woodhouse informed the Hamburg congregation, in writing, of its expulsion from the Catholic Apostolic Church. This is commonly known as the "Hamburg Schism". The Hamburg congregation, along with Prophet Geyer, split off to form the Allgemeine Apostolische Mission (General Apostolic Congregation) in 1863, and shortly thereafter the Dutch branch of the Restored Apostolic Mission Church, at first known as Apostolische Zending and officially registered as Hersteld Apostolische Zendingkerk (HAZK) in 1893. Today, 4 January 1863 is considered the date on which the New Apostolic Church was established.

As Rosochaki had returned to the Catholic Apostolic Church, this left the newly independent Hamburg congregation without apostolic authority: no more believers could be sealed; no ministers could be ordained. On 12 April 1863, a deacon delivered a prophecy calling Priest Carl Louis Preuss as an apostle. Prophet Heinrich Geyer confirmed this calling a little later. On 25 May 1863, Friedrich Wilhelm Schwartz was also called as an apostle through many prophetically gifted members in the congregation, and also through Prophet Geyer. Thus began the work of the Apostles of the New Order, with German "apostles" spreading "the word" around the world.

=== The First Schism ===
The Prophet Geyer initiated the first schism in the new body for the same reason as the schism from the English apostles and as for leaving the Catholic Apostolic congregations, namely apostles not validating the prophet's call for an apostle. Friction existed between the Prophet Geyer and Apostle Preuss concerning whether prophets or apostles had higher authority, and when Apostle Preuss died on 25 July 1878, open conflict broke out. Geyer had already called the coal dealer Johannes F. L. Gueldner as an apostle in a private meeting four months before apostle Preuss' death. Apostle Preuss had refused to recognise this calling and, on his deathbed, designated Elder Wichmann as his successor. However, he was not able to stop Geyer because "the word of a prophet carried more weight in those days than the word of the Lord".

Geyer called Gueldner again as an apostle, and as the successor of Preuss, in a service on 4 August 1878. The majority of the Hamburg congregation protested, Wichmann stepped up to the altar and, without much ado, relieved Geyer from his ministry. The ensuing tumult led to a flurry of apostle callings. Wichmann's wife, supported by her son, called him an apostle through prophecy. A maid called her master as an apostle, also by prophecy. Other prophetic people called a fourth person as an apostle. The result of this chaos was that none of those who were called could prevail. Wichmann told Geyer that he had to leave, so Geyer left the church with his followers, taking their vestments and several sacramental items with them. A successor for Preuss was not selected at this time (this happened later in 1880). Going by a prophecy, the remaining Hamburg congregation gave themselves under the care of Apostle Menkhoff but the congregation had suffered severe losses from the schism.

Geyer and his followers founded a new congregation in Hamburg named Apostolische Mission (Apostolic Mission). They built a chapel and served together with Gueldner, also in Silesia. His congregation never gained any importance, and wasted away after his death in 1896. The remainder of the Hamburg congregation adopted the name Allgemeine Christliche Apostolische Mission (General Christian Apostolic Mission).

=== The Chief Apostle office established ===
After the death of Apostle H. F. Schwartz, the remaining active Apostles of the New Order formed a central, ruling ministry in the form of the Chief Apostle in either 1895, 1896 or 1897, and designated Friedrich Krebs to this office. This office did not exist before Schwartz's death. He had been an angel (bishop) in the Catholic Apostolic Church, which was opposed to designating any one person as head of the church, citing that Christ is the head of the Christian Church. In contrast, the role of the chief apostle ministry was not intended to usurp the leadership of Christ, but more realistically aimed to continue the succession of Simon Peter, as Christ's immediate subordinate on Earth.

In 1895, there were only six active apostles, three in Europe and one each in South Africa, Australia, and Indonesia. With the establishment of a higher apostolic office, the chief apostle appointed all subsequent apostles as opposed to prophetic calling, which had been fundamental since the formation of the Catholic Apostolic Church. By 1899, the traditional limit of twelve apostles had been discarded and more men were ordained as apostles. Parallel to the progress of the New Apostolic denomination, schisms occurred on several occasions elsewhere in the world. The reasons for those divisions were different but mainly related to disputes regarding the central ministry of the chief apostle.

=== Development during the 20th century ===
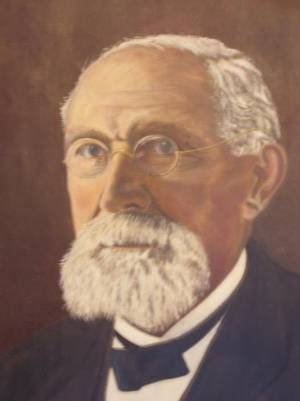
Chief Apostle Hermann Niehaus

In August 1906, Chief Apostle Niehaus ordained Apostle Helper Johann Gottfried Bischoff as District Apostle of the Middle Germany and Württemberg district, replacing the late Apostle Ruff. He also renamed the Neuapostolische Gemeinde (New Apostolic Congregation) as Neuapostolische Kirche (New Apostolic Church) and created a public corporation for it. He ordained numerous young ministers and regularly convened conferences of apostles. He founded the periodical church publication Apostolisches Sonntagsblatt ('Apostolic Sunday Paper'), later Neuapostolische Rundschau ('New Apostolic Review'), in 1907 as an additional weekly publication to go along with Der Herold and Wächterstimme von Ephraim ('Watchman's Voice of Ephraim'). In 1908 he issued the Allgemeinen Hausregeln ('General House Rules') and in 1916 he wrote the first textbook about the New Apostolic faith, Fragen & Antworten ('Questions & Answers'). This book still exists in its revised 1992 version, but will be replaced by the new catechism.

As the first of the chief apostles, Apostle Niehaus and Apostle Carl August Brückner visited United States congregations on 19 August 19, 1909. The outbreak of war in 1914 brought high exposure to the church. The soldiers at the frontlines were administered the Holy Communion by field post as bread hosts with three drops of wine on them. This practice was established in every congregation in 1917 and remains to this day. While the Holy Communion had originally been celebrated separately with bread and wine, the current practice uses unleavened bread wafers which are manufactured with three drops of wine trickled onto each.

The name Neuapostolische Kirche (New Apostolic Church) came into use in North America as early as 1918. A variety of names had been used there previously, including German Apostolic Church and Apostolic Church. This name was uniformly adopted in Germany in the late 1920s as well.

On 25 January 1930, the day before his 25-year anniversary as Chief Apostle, Niehaus fell down the stairs in an accident and was pressed to give up his duties. He remained diligent but was finally retired by the council of apostles on 21 September 1930. He died on 23 August 1932 at the age of 84 years.

In 1905, Chief Apostle Niehaus oversaw six apostle districts with 488 congregations. At the end of his tenure, there were twelve European apostle districts with about 1,600 congregations and further 200 congregations overseas. The New Apostolic Church in Germany counted 138,000 members in 1925.

The initially deep ecumenical conviction, which was cultivated in the Catholic Apostolic Church and then by Heinrich Geyer, had declined over time due to heavy conflicts with other Christian denominations, perhaps because the theologian education of ministers in the Catholic Apostolic Church may have been lacking (only a few had been Catholic Apostolic ministers before), or there may have been rejection by the national churches.

The lower social classes, from which important ministers were drawn, were essential for the growth of the church. Nationalistic appeals can be found in hymnaries and theological scriptures from that time. Also, significantly for that period, the church's structure became increasingly hierarchical. The most charismatic element of the Catholic Apostolic Church, prophecies, became rarer (the last oral lore dates from the 1980s) and the prophet ministry disappeared. In fact, a total reform of the evangelical pattern can be observed and which became apparent by expelling Catholic Apostolic influences.

=== Setbacks in Nazi Germany ===
In the early 1930s, the head of the NAC was Johann Bischoff. In March 1933, Bischoff held a church service where he announced that the Fuhrer had been sent from God; a month later he ordered all congregations to check the background of potential new members against Nazi party records to see if they were suitable. NAC members were encouraged to join the Nazi party and the NAC carried out fundraising for the party.

The New Apostolic Church, like many other small organisations and societies, had to accept compromises with the Nazi regime to avoid being prohibited or persecuted and the New Apostolic Church was not prohibited, unlike a number of other religious communities or sects. The extent which Nazi views and attitudes were spread within the church, and whether this happened out of fear of reprisals or one's own expulsion, is today still a controversial subject between the church and its critics.

Despite the Nazi propaganda which the church spread, some sources tell of converted Jews in the congregations being helped by the New Apostolic Christians. Although many of the apostles joined the Nazi Party (NSDAP) for reasons of fear, there were a few apostles and district apostles who publicly expressed their adverse attitude toward the regime.

According to Nazi requirements, all divine services had to be concluded with a "Heil Hitler". Some ministers' congregation chiefs did not obey those orders, especially in rural areas. This led to several congregations being closed repeatedly over time. According to church accounts, prohibitions were cancelled partially, with hardship. This became apparent by other measures adopted. The Nazis burdened the New Apostolic Church with inordinately high duties, suppressed youth care, arbitrarily rejected purchases of land and establishment of chapels, did not allow collection of offerings and prohibited the release of church publications as well as printing of bibles and hymnaries.

This attitude was explained in 1996 by Chief Apostle Richard Fehr, while church spokesman Peter Johanning elaborated on it in 2003. Johanning gave an account of a Jugendfreund article of July 1933, in which "allegiance" was already invoked shortly after Hitler's seizure of power. By referencing Sir 10 EU, that text legitimised the relation of church and state, "It may be regarded as naïve today, but age back then revealed different reasonings". At that time ministers of the church were actually implored by church guidelines to abstain from political representation.

=== Botschaft by Chief Apostle Bischoff ===
On Christmas Day 1951, during service in Giessen, Germany, Chief Apostle J. G. Bischoff delivered his Botschaft ('message'), announcing that the Lord had made known to him that he would not die before the Second Coming of Jesus Christ, during which the chosen people were to be taken into his kingdom (the First Resurrection). In 1954, this teaching became the church's official dogma. Those ministers, especially the apostles, who did not preach this message lost their positions and were excommunicated from the New Apostolic Church. Approximately one quarter of apostles active during this time resigned or retired early, several schisming to form their own denomination. The most important "victim" of this policy was Peter Kuhlen, who had been ordained in 1948 as the successor to J. G. Bischoff. The impact of this message varied regionally; all of the apostles active in South Africa resigned or retired (1954), both apostles in South America resigned (1957), several apostles in Europe (1954–55) resigned, but no schism formed in North America. When Chief Apostle Bischoff died on 7 July 1960, his dogma about Christ's return had not been fulfilled. In the service on 10 July 1960, Walter Schmidt was introduced as the new chief apostle and, during that service, the admonition to the members was to answer external critics with silence regarding the Bischoff prophecy.

Even today, the church administration has not renounced the Botschaft, but has set it at liberty for every church member to make his or her own opinion. According to Chief Apostle Wilhelm Leber it is "no dogma anymore". The excommunicated ministers and members have not been reinstated. The first official removal of all exclusions, apology for opponents of the Botschaft prophecy - not for the prophecy itself - and attempted rapprochements regarding the prophecy were started in 2005 and 2006, in Switzerland and Saarland. Since then members of Apostolische Gemeinde des Saarlandes have been visiting New Apostolic divine services. Until end or 2007 the NAC and United Apostolic Church (UAC) were reviewing common historical topics, supported and encouraged by liberal members. On 4 December 2007, the NAC held a broadcast information evening where the German apostles were blamed to be the only guilty persons for the circumstances and splits in 1955. As a result, the talks were suspended by the UAC.

On 13 May 2013, Chief Apostle Wilhelm Leber finally addressed the Bischoff message on behalf of the New Apostolic Church. Leber stated that over fifty years had passed leaving plenty of time for a "sober analysis" in order to address the situation properly. Leber formally apologised for all the suffering that had taken place due to the "message", and declared the New Apostolic Church no longer considered the message a "divine revelation" or a situation of God "changing his will". The statement closed with the remark that each individual is left to come to their own conclusions on the subject.

== Theology ==
New Apostolic Christians believe in the Trinity: God the Father, the creator of the world; God the Son (Jesus the Son of Man), personified God, redeemer and Head of the Church; and the Holy Spirit, who guides the church by his revelations, gives knowledge to the believers and acts universally. In this, NAC hardly differs from other Trinitarian churches.

The religion accepts the Apostles' Creed, believes in the sacramental nature of Holy Communion and baptism, considers the Bible as the authority of the word of God, the second coming of Christ and the gifts of the Holy Spirit.

According to French Bishop Jean Vernette, the New Apostolic members are "strict millenarists", but sociologist Gilles Séraphin stated their millenarism is less pronounced than that of Jehovah's Witnesses and Adventists, and that this is an "église de Réveil" ('revival church'), which retains a Pentecostal look from its origins.

In December 2012, the New Apostolic Church's catechism was made available. It "contains a detailed description of the New Apostolic doctrine and expresses the Church’s position on various topics".

=== Bible ===
In the New Apostolic Church the Bible is granted a high authority because its writers are believed to have been inspired by the Holy Spirit. The English congregations have officially used the New King James Version since 1998. It is the duty of the apostles to watch over the regular exegesis. The apostles interpret the Bible in the same way as Protestantism and Catholicism, except for their interpretation of Holy Sealing and beliefs about the departed.

The District Apostles' meeting from 22 to 24 September 2004 in Nice emphasised again that the Holy Scripture is recognised and regarded as the doctrinal basis of the NAC. In particular, the statements of the New Testament, especially the gospel of Jesus and the epistles of the Apostles, are of definitive importance. Individual Biblical books and passages, along with statements of apostles and ministers of the New Apostolic Church, must have grounding in the Holy Scriptures. The doctrine and its proclamation must not contradict the fundamental statements of the gospel.

The church regards the basis of this faith as being found in the Bible, including the Apocrypha. In 2005, a District Apostles Meeting declared that "the Apocrypha are just as binding for the faith and doctrine of the New Apostolic Church as the other writings of the Old Testament."

=== Sacraments ===
The New Apostolic Church knows three sacraments:

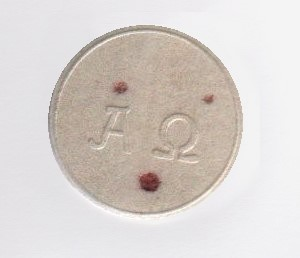
Conventional Communion host

==== Holy Baptism with water ====
The Holy Baptism with water is believed to be part of the spiritual rebirth, and a prerequisite for receiving the Holy Spirit in the Church. Both children and adults can be baptised. A person baptised as a child will later confess the baptism, at the age of 14/15 by confirmation. The baptism can be performed by priestly ministries.

Holy Baptism is taught to be the first and fundamental act of grace of the Triune God, bestowed on a person believing in Christ. The act of this sacrament is believed to the remission of the original sin. In this respect, it's thought that the candidate for baptism has a share in Christ's merit, and experiences their first close relationship with God. The person becomes a (visible) Christian and is thus adopted into the fellowship of those who believe in Jesus Christ and avow themselves to him. Baptisms performed by other Christian churches are recognised as long as they were performed with water consecrated for the purpose and in the name of God.

==== Holy Communion ====
The sacrament of Holy Communion is celebrated "as a feast of joy and thankfulness" in every service.

The Church teaches that this commemorates the sacrificial death of Christ, Son of God, who allowed himself to be crucified for the sins of mankind despite his innocence. It's believed that Holy Communion preserves the eternal life of the soul and accords it the security of remaining in the fellowship of life with its redeemer Jesus Christ. For the New Apostolic Church, the "body and blood" of Jesus are dispensed as bread and wine in the form of a consecrated wafer. By partaking of it in faith, an individual assimilates the nature of Jesus and receives "strength from God". The Holy Communion is available for members and those who have been invited as guests. Priestly ministries direct the Holy Communion.

==== Holy Sealing ====
Holy Sealing is the dispensing of Holy Spirit. By this act the believer is filled with Holy Spirit as a strength of God, not as the third person of God. It is carried about through prayer and laying on of hands of an apostle, provided that the believer has been first baptised with water.

The Holy Baptism with water and the Holy Sealing are believed to constitute the rebirth out of water and Spirit; by this the "childhood in God" is attained. As a child of God the believer is granted the opportunity to participate in the Second Coming of Christ. From this moment on the believer is an adherent of the New Apostolic Church. The Holy Sealing is also dispensed to children whereby the parents must profess their faith in the doctrine of Jesus and the apostles.

The church interprets the sacrament for example with the biblical text of Acts 8:14–17 8:14–17 and Acts 19:6.

Because Holy Sealing is an institutional manner of giving the Holy Spirit, conducted by the apostles of Early Christianity, New Apostolic Church considers the "childhood in God" possible for other Christians as well referring to the overall acting of the Holy Spirit (John 3:8, Romans 18:7, 1. John 4:2).

=== Eschatology ===
The Church teaches that the Second Coming of Jesus Christ is imminent, and the goal of faith is to be worthy to be the Bride of Christ when he returns.

Eschatology in the New Apostolic Church has been refined recently to this end time sequence:

1. The completion of the true body of Christ (Invisible church)
2. The Second Coming of Christ and the Rapture
3. The marriage of the Lamb and, simultaneously, the Great Tribulation on Earth – Steps 2 and 3 build the First Resurrection as written in the Bible
4. The return of Jesus Christ and his congregation to the Earth
5. The binding of Satan
6. The resurrection of the witnesses of Christ from the time of the great tribulation (martyrs)
7. The establishment of the thousand-year kingdom of peace under the rule of Jesus Christ
8. The Last Judgment
9. The new creation

=== Apostle ministry and exclusivism ===
The spiritual leaders of the New Apostolic Church are called apostles. They are considered to be indispensable to preparing their members for the goal of faith. This goal is to be led into eternal community with God at the Second Coming of Christ. It takes center stage of a New Apostolic Christian's faith.

The apostles of the New Apostolic Church consider themselves as successors of the first Apostles during early Christianity, who had been sent by Jesus Christ. In their tradition, they act as missionaries, who go to all men to preach the Gospel of Jesus Christ, and to prepare them for the Second Coming of Christ and eternal life. According to the NAC, the apostles are the only ones on earth who have the mission to forgive sins and baptise with the Holy Spirit. It is also a duty of the apostles, and all the ministers of the NAC, to affirm corporate feeling within the church and to support the members with pastoral care.

The New Apostolic Church teaches that apostles are necessary for salvation. That means that God has re-established the apostle ministry in order to collect all the Christians for the Second Coming of Christ. Therefore, the expression "necessary for salvation" indicates the plan of God that the apostle ministry must act on earth until His son returns. The question Who will attend the Second Coming of Christ? is not answered with it. Because the Holy Spirit acts in other churches as well, God alone forgives sins, and may find his "children" without Holy Sealing. The NAC considers the affiliation of non-members to the Second Coming of Christ to be possible.

The NAC also claims they would not contradict other churches who teach that final salvation is granted on the day of Last Judgement. The NAC sees the period of activity of the apostles to reach to the Second Coming of Christ, but no further. By Last Judgement, there will be no visible church, but the faith in Christ will be the sole element. Thus the NAC denies any claim of absoluteness or religious totalitarianism.

=== Beliefs about death and beyond ===
A distinctive and controversial feature of the New Apostolic Church is its doctrine about the dead. A special divine service of remembrance and intercession in prayer takes place three times annually. In such divine services the apostles also administer the sacraments to a living subsidiary minister. Regarding this, New Apostolic Christians refer to several biblical texts such as 1 Corinthians 15:29. There are no limitations to whom in the beyond may be baptised by apostles.

The Holy Communion is administered each Sunday in divine services held by a district apostle or the Chief Apostle. It is possible for the dead to find grace before God and have their sins forgiven. It is also possible, by the sacrifice of Jesus Christ, that the dead can find faith. Just as it is possible to be saved without finding the New Apostolic faith, the dead can be saved another way by Christ's grace, therefore without help of Apostles. The New Apostolic Church clearly states that most questions regarding this issue cannot be fully answered.

=== Moral conduct ===
The New Apostolic Church emphasises the personal accountability of its members for their actions. The individual is responsible to God for his behaviour. The gospel of Christ, and the system of values inherent in the Ten Commandments provide clear orientation in this respect. However, the church itself is politically neutral and independent. It is financed by the voluntary donations of its members.

=== New Apostolic Creed ===
This is the New Apostolic Creed circa 2010:

#	Article
1	"I believe in God the Father, the Almighty, maker of heaven and earth".
2	"I believe in Jesus Christ, the only begotten Son of God, our Lord, who was conceived by the Holy Spirit, born of the Virgin Mary, suffered under Pontius Pilate, was crucified, died, and was buried, entered the realm of the dead, rose again from the dead on the third day, and ascended into heaven. He is seated at the right hand of God, the Father Almighty, from where He will return".
3	"I believe in the Holy Spirit, the one, holy, universal, and apostolic church, the community of the saints, the forgiveness of sins, the resurrection of the dead, and life everlasting".
4	"I believe that the Lord Jesus rules His Church and thereto sent His Apostles, and until His return, still sends them with the commission to teach, to forgive sins in His name and to baptise with water and Holy Spirit".
5	"I believe that those designated by God for a ministry are ordained only by Apostles, and that authority, blessing, and sanctification for their ministration come forth out of the apostle ministry".
6	"I believe that the Holy Baptism with water is the first step to a renewal of a human being in the Holy Spirit, and that the person baptised is adopted into the fellowship of those who believe in Jesus Christ and profess Him as their Lord".
7	"I believe that Holy Communion was instituted by the Lord Himself in memory of the once brought, fully valid sacrifice, and bitter suffering and death of Christ. The worthy partaking of Holy Communion establishes our fellowship with Jesus Christ, our Lord. It is celebrated with unleavened bread and wine; both must be consecrated and dispensed by a minister authorised by an Apostle".
8	"I believe that those baptised with water must, through an Apostle, receive the gift of the Holy Spirit to attain the childhood in God and thereby the prerequisite for becoming a firstling".
9	"I believe that the Lord Jesus will return as surely as He ascended into heaven and that He will take to Himself the firstfruits of the dead and living who have hoped for and were prepared for His coming; that after the marriage in heaven He will return to earth with them, to establish His kingdom of peace and that they will reign with Him as a royal priesthood. After the conclusion of the kingdom of peace, He will hold the Last Judgment. Then God will create a new heaven and a new earth and dwell with His people".
10	"I believe that I am obliged to obey the worldly authorities provided no godly laws are thereby transgressed".

=== Current changes ===
Committees (project groups) within the NAC meet from time to time, under the authority of the Chief Apostle, to discuss and revise some fundamental or exclusive views of the church concerning authority, historical or linguistic background. They frequently cite examples of the regular activity of large churches. This has led to corrections and clear distinctions to previous doctrines. The Chief Apostle describes these corrections as "focusing", because the church believes in a constant act of the Holy Spirit, who gives knowledge.

=== Social issues and ethics (official statements) ===
==== Blood transfusion, organ donation, stem-cell research ====
The New Apostolic Church does not have any objections to blood or organ donation, provided that either the donor consents or that brain death has already taken place.

The Church regards fertilisation as the beginning of life. Each embryo is said to deserve urgent protection whether inside or outside the womb; it is not suitable material for research or destruction. However, the Church approves research with adult stem cells.

==== Concubinage ====
The Church recommends marriage and emphasises the importance of the marriage blessing for living together. Members in concubinage are not permitted to exercise priestly ministries unless they intend to marry. That excludes deacons. Such lifestyle is in process of analysis.

==== Ecumenism ====
The New Apostolic Church is open toward the ecumenical movement. Contacts on local and institutional levels serve principally to facilitate better mutual acquaintance and to dismantle prejudices. Due to differences in doctrinal statements, it is not possible for the Church to participate in ecumenical divine services or acts of blessing. The New Apostolic Church has reinforced its efforts to cultivate good neighbourly relationships with other churches and denominations. This occurs primarily through invitations to both the community and church congregations for special events, and through combined benefit events for charitable purposes. The question as to whether this may lead to membership status in the ecumenical movement cannot be answered at this time.

==== Evolution and evolutionary theory ====
The New Apostolic Church does not consider the broad theory of evolution to be the unique suitable explanation for the creation of life, because this theory does not take into consideration the presence of God as the Creator. However, the Church does not consider scientific insights on evolution to be in contradiction to the statements of the Bible.

The Church is careful to distinguish between evolutionary theory and evolution itself. While the theory in scientific terms does describe the laws according to which evolution takes place, it does not give any explanation as to the origin of the creation. By contrast, evolution — the continuing development within the living and the inanimate world — occurs according to the divinely prescribed laws of nature and does not contradict the statements of the Holy Scripture.

==== Homosexuality ====
The Church maintains that it is solely for God to determine whether, and to what extent, a person acquires guilt before God through the practice of his or her homosexuality. In this regard, the Church expressly states that sexual orientation has no relevance in pastoral care.

The Church however states that its members who are "practicing homosexuals", or living in a "homosexual partnership", cannot carry out ministerial as this would suggest that the Church takes a stance on the issue. However, those people are allowed to serve in other duties of the church such as teaching religion instruction to Sunday school children.

==== Suicide ====
According to the understanding of the Holy Scriptures, suicide is sin, because life is a gift of God. No human being has the right to take his or her own life, or that of any other human being. Likewise, no one has the right to condemn someone who has committed suicide. Only God is able to see all the factors involved, and he can also be gracious to such a soul according to his will.

== Divine service, practices and pastoral work ==
Church activities are mainly focused on divine services and pastoral care of the membership. In addition, the New Apostolic Church engages in charitable activities within the bounds of its limited resources. If, in individual cases, help is urgently required, it is given directly and according to the need.

=== Liturgy ===
The liturgy of the New Apostolic Church was originally consistent with the liturgy of the Catholic Apostolic Church, which contained strong elements of the Roman Catholic and Anglican rite. This lasted until 1885, when emphasis of the divine services shifted towards the liturgy of the word under the influence of Dutch Calvinism. Today, only a few aspects of the Catholic Apostolic tradition remain in the New Apostolic liturgy.

The Church does not use its own publications during services and members are discouraged from bringing their Bible, as they could be distracted from the sermons. Internal circulars and documents explaining the church's guidelines, which come from the Chief Apostle and are considered to have the same authority as the Biblical epistles, are supposed to provide the correct meanings of the Bible. They are not available to ordinary members, only to elders. According to religious anthropologist Thomas Kirsch, elders are seen as the "source of denominational knowledge", and members are connected to their religion's headquarters "through chains of referentiality in the form of textual quotations".

The remission of sins (absolution) is conducted in every single divine service, in the name of Jesus, by an apostle or by a lower minister under order of the apostle. Mistakenly, many New Apostolic Christians assume that absolution belongs to the sacrament of Holy Communion or is even a sacrament on its own. Chief Apostle Leber clearly stated in 2009 that this special mission of absolution is bound to the apostle ministry, but not that other Christians or human beings would have no access to God's forgiveness. The forgiveness of sins, with or without absolution, is eventually a sovereign decision of God himself.

This is the outline of a New Apostolic divine service:

- Before the divine service:
  - Musical contributions are played (e.g. organ or instrumental music, choral singing)
  - Announcements may be read to the congregation by a minister
  - Brief silence for inner preparation of each participant
  - The participants begin to sing the Opening Hymn. Meanwhile, the ministers leave the vestry and enter the church hall, heading towards the altar. The officiant leading that particular divine service stands behind the altar
- During the divine service:
  - Free prayer by the officiant
  - The officiant reads out the biblical word for the sermon
  - Choir, musicians or the participants sing
  - Sermon of the officiant
  - Further musical contribution
  - Other ministers chosen by the officiant preach
- Celebration of Holy Communion:
  - The Lord's Prayer is prayed by all participants
  - Absolution – forgiveness of sins by officiant
  - Officiant's constituted prayer of intercession
  - The officiant consecrates the wafer (hosts consisting of bread and wine) and gives them to the ministers
    - possibly afterwards:
      - Holy Baptism with water
      - Holy Sealing (by Apostles only)
      - Adoption (of a baptised Christian)
      - Confirmation (Act of blessing – usually on Easter Day or Palm Sunday)
  - The ministers give the hosts to the participants, while there is background music (i.e., piano/organ) or the sitting ones are singing the Communion Hymn. Further Hymn or choral singing possibly afterwards
  - In divine services by district apostles(or their delegate) only: Giving Holy Communion to chosen ministers assistant for the departed.
    - Acts of blessing possibly afterwards (e.g. marriage ceremony, wedding anniversary, ordination or retirement of a minister)
- Close:
  - Prayer of thanks by the officiant
  - Benediction and the participants sing the Threefold Amen
  - Possible administrative announcements with regard to deadlines by a minister
  - Musical contribution

=== Sermon ===
The New Apostolic ministers preach without a manuscript. They prepare themselves for the sermon with the small Divine Service Guide publication released monthly by the church administration. The Guide was reformatted in December 2007 to give the officiant a structured introduction to the subject matter along with background knowledge about the biblical word, historical knowledge, cross-references, additional sources and so on. The contents of one topic may be spread across several divine services within a month so that each divine service can cover a subtopic and build upon the main topic, in order to teach and guide the listeners better.

A theological education is not necessary to hold a New Apostolic ministry. Continuing the tradition of Apostle Peter, the Holy Spirit is believed to act through the ministers during the sermon, but the Church does not consider the ministers to be infallible. One criticism has been that ministers under stress preach habitual content and verbiage between sermons. Also, ministers with insufficient instruction in New Apostolic theology and doctrines have accidentally preached false teachings, leading to misunderstandings. The Church has counteracted this with numerous seminars, and it requests that ministers of each congregation coordinate their sermon topics together.

=== Attendance ===
Anywhere from 20 to 100% of the officially registered members of the Church attend the divine services regularly. While attendance statistics in Central Europe are declining, in Eastern and Western Europe, South America and Africa attendance numbers are relatively high. Regular participants frequently engage in church life and stand out due to their feelings of togetherness. A particular care exists for children, youth, and seniors. The Church culture tends towards formal dress and appearance, although all are welcome and a "come as you are" attitude exists.

=== Church music ===
The choir of each congregation meets for regular choir rehearsal whenever possible, as do the various orchestras and instrumental groups. Music is promoted to a great extent in the New Apostolic Church. Choir members used to have to wear black and white to sing, but now choir members only have to wear black and white on special occasions.

The cultural life of the NAC has continued to develop, just as it has opened to the public. In addition to traditional church choirs, which are sometimes known among other denominations due to their quality, there are progressive music groups and ensembles which also perform publicly. Musical works of the nineteenth century or later are an essential part of the church's music literature.

Portions of the New Apostolic music literature have been revised and supplemented by literature from other Christian churches. Most of the hymns in the New Apostolic songbook are also sung in the Roman Catholic Church or Protestant Churches. A new songbook, which replaced the one from 1925, has been used since Easter 2005 in the Germanic countries and since September 2008 in the Anglophone countries.

=== Fellowship ===
The church and delegates of other denominations regard the communal fellowship of the New Apostolic Christians as one of their biggest strengths. "We stick together. We help each other, we are on first-name terms with each other, we all know each other. If one of us builds a garage, we muck in. We are a little family", says Andreas Fincke, former religious scholar of the Protestant Church of Berlin. Many New Apostolic Christians have deep friendships within their congregation or district.

=== Emblem ===
The emblem of the church portrays a white Latin cross, hovering above stylised waves on blue background. The sun rises at the horizon of those waves, symbolised by 10 rays. There is no definite interpretation of its meaning. According to Peter Johanning, spokesman of the church, the various elements can be interpreted as Crucifixion of Jesus Christ (cross), Holy Baptism (water) and as Holy Sealing (sun), referring to the three sacraments of the church. Sunrise or sunset in the emblem could also be regarded as the immediate Second Coming of Christ. The first official emblem was created by Chief Apostle Schmidt in 1968 and can still be found on many church buildings. It was changed to a more modern appearance by Chief Apostle Richard Fehr in 1995.

== Organisation ==
The church ministers have no formal theological training. In addition to their family, professional and social obligations, they perform their pastoral duties in an honorary capacity. One of their most important duties is to give pastoral care to the believers assigned to them.

The NAC does perform ordination of women (although the church has announced that, as of January 2023, "it will be possible for women to be ordained to ministry in the New Apostolic Church," according to an announcement made on 20 September 2022, by Chief Apostle Jean-Luc Schneider in a globally transmitted video address). For now, many women teach in the Sunday preschool, Sunday school and confirmation school, provide other religious education and hold leading positions in administrative duties and in music. Some congregations and districts have women who have a similar role to a deacon. At the end of his term, Chief Apostle Richard Fehr said that he considered the potential ordination of women as deaconesses, and the apostles are still considering the issue.

To become a minister, a male member of a congregation must accept an offer of ordination from a senior minister. It is the desire of the Church for these candidates to be elected with the assistance of prayer. This happens with the higher ministers, although ministries like priests or deacons are given to those with adequate circumstances (time, job, etc.). If the candidate accepts, an apostle will ordain him during a divine service. Apostles and also bishops, if possible, are ordained by the Chief Apostle.

The congregations are the centre of religious life. They are in the care of shepherds, evangelists or priests commissioned by the apostles. The rectors of the congregations are assisted by priests and deacons.

If a minister spreads teachings which are clearly against New Apostolic doctrines or canonical Christian interpretation of the Bible he may be suspended temporarily, or be released from his ministry. A minister may also ask for time off or resign from his ministry voluntarily.

Political neutrality:
The New Apostolic Church abstains from all political statements. It expects its members to fulfill the laws and the civil obligations of their countries as long as divine laws are not transgressed. The church attaches importance to open and trusting relations with governments, authorities and the general public. New Apostolic Christians are free to engage in public life.

=== Hierarchy ===
The ministries in the NAC are hierarchical. The different ministries are:

Apostles:

Chief Apostle
The Chief Apostle is the head of the church. His position is equivalent to the one Apostle Peter had 2,000 years ago in the circle of the Apostles. Traditionally only the Chief Apostle appoints new apostles although at times of necessity, such as during World War II, he can commission an apostle to ordain other apostles. Helge Mutschler is the current Chief Apostle as of 2026.
District Apostles
Those working closest to the Chief Apostle are the District Apostles. They are the heads of the different regional churches and are assisted by other apostles. Together with the Chief Apostle, they provide global unity in church doctrine and in pastoral care. District apostles can serve Holy Communion to the departed, as well as baptise and seal the departed.
Apostles
The apostle ministry is a very important ministry in the NAC. Only apostles can carry out the gift of the Holy Spirit and ordain new ministries. Presently there are 360 or more working apostles worldwide. Apostles can also assist their district apostle in the commission of district apostle helper. District apostle helpers can serve Holy Communion to the departed, as well as baptise and seal the departed.

Priests:

The different priestly ministries work in the local congregations and have responsibility for the direct spiritual care of the congregations. Priestly ministries can carry out Holy Baptism and Holy Communion. The ministries that are considered priestly are as follows:

District rectors (priestly ministry)

They are in charge of the districts and work one-on-one with the local apostle(s).

Priests
Priests have direct responsibility for the spiritual care of the members. Several priests can belong to one congregation, depending on the local need. Priests, or higher ministries, can be commissioned to care for a congregation as the rector. Priests conduct services unless a higher ministry is present. Priests are often switched around to conduct divine service in nearby congregations.

Deacons:

Deacons
The deacon ministry is a local ministry. A deacon generally works in his home congregation to support the priests. If a priest is unavailable, a deacon will hold a divine service without the act of communion. Deacons are also allowed to participate in a service along with the priests.

=== Structure ===
The international office of the New Apostolic Church is located in Zurich, Switzerland, and is the seat of the New Apostolic Church International Apostle Unity (NAKI). The members of NAKI are the Chief Apostle, the District Apostles and the Apostles and the worldwide church is led from there. The church is divided into several regional churches (districts), covering entire countries or continents. Depending on national laws, the District Apostles are the heads of the regional churches (often incorporated) and have sole fiscal authority for their district. The NAC is financed by voluntary gifts from the church members and does not collect taxes. Money received is used for building maintenance, social aid and aid for the developing countries. The church is politically neutral and expects its members to comply with local laws.

The Chief Apostle and the District Apostles meet regularly to consult each other on church matters of international significance. Every three years all Apostles gather for an international general assembly.

=== Finances ===
The international church is financed by allocations from District Apostle areas, and arranges for financially weak areas to receive aid from financially strong ones. The lion's share of earnings are used for construction and maintenance of church buildings, which are maintained by District Apostle areas. A considerable part of the budget is also spent on missionary work. The church aims to manage its affairs with as little administration as possible financial records are publicly available upon request or published on church websites or in Our Family, the official magazine of the Church. Bookkeeping and accounting requirements are largely handled by independent certified public accountants.

Pastoral and organisational duties in the congregations are carried out in an honorary capacity. All acts and blessings performed by the Church, e.g. baptisms, wedding ceremonies or funeral services are carried out free of charge. Generally bishops and apostles are the only ministers employed full-time by the church with their salary coming from offerings and authorised by accountants.

=== Church institutions ===
In keeping with the needs of the congregations, there are a great many other services provided. It is important for church activities to cater to the needs of children (Sunday preschool, Sunday school and religious instruction), youth (youth evenings, youth services, youth events) and senior citizens (senior events).

==== Publisher ====
Friedrich Bischoff, son of Chief Apostle Johann Gottfried Bischoff, founded the Friedrich Bischoff Verlag Gmbh in the 1930s. The company is located in Frankfurt am Main, Germany, and attached to NAC Southern Germany. Considered a Christian publisher, it publishes three church-internal magazines for the NAC:

Our Family has an international circulation of 350,000 copies. It is released twice a month in German, French, English, Spanish, Portuguese and Indonesian and once a month in another 21 languages. The content includes accounts of the Chief Apostle's divine services or travelogues, religious or historical background knowledge, stories about different congregations and advertisements. Our Family has had a German web presence since 2008.

We Children has an international total circulation of 18,000 and is released twice a month in German, English, French, Russian, Portuguese and Dutch. It covers topics about Christians and the Bible. The magazine contains children's magazine material such as reading texts, pictures to colour, handicrafts instructions, brainteasers and public activities.

Spirit is a magazine particularly for young New Apostolic Christians. Current issues are discussed and examined for religious and critical purposes. The magazine also publishes many accounts of other denominations. It has a German web presence.

==== Children ====
There are many opportunities for children within the Church. They usually pass through several stages of education. In Sunday preschool (5 and younger) and Sunday school (6–10 years old) children are introduced to the general Christian faith and Bible stories. After this, children continue to religious education, which covers Christian and denominational history. Finally, children attend the Confirmation School, which explains New Apostolic belief in detail. A 14- or 15-year-old can be confirmed with the blessing of the Church. During these years, children are provided with many educational materials including a bible. There are many children's activities besides Church education, such as the famous Cape Town Children's Choir.

Children celebrate Holy Communion just as adults do. However, in some congregations appointed "priests for children" give them the sacred wafer in a separate room after a short explanation of the process.

==== Youth ====
The New Apostolic Church conducts annual national youth days with a special divine service. Stadiums, conference halls or similar venues are used for these events. Youth days are usually split into two main parts. A divine service is held for the youth in the morning by the District Apostle or Chief Apostle followed by a common lunch and afternoon program. There are choirs, orchestra or bands playing music. Religious issues are presented in the form of movies, theatre pieces or workshops. Many organisers are making heavier use of youth opinions and suggestions about church matters.

A special youth day for the whole of Europe, European Youth Day 2009, took place in May 2009 in the LTU Arena in Düsseldorf, Germany.

Various youth activities take place within each district, namely monthly divine services, local or regional youth hours, choir rehearsal, sporting events and leisure activities. Many youth organise their own activity groups for photography, journalism, ecumenism, etc. There are also many youth websites for the New Apostolic Church.

==== Host Bakery ====
The main bakery is located in Bielefeld, Germany. One host is produced every 1.5 seconds, thus almost 130,000 hosts can be produced per day. In 2007, 230 million hosts were delivered to 50 countries in Europe, the Americas and a few in Asia and Africa. The bakery was founded in 1925 by a New Apostolic master baker named Pflug from Herne, Germany.

Chief Apostle Niehaus had the first hosts produced for New Apostolic Christians at the front lines during World War I. Before this, Holy Communion had been celebrated according to the Catholic Apostolic custom, with a piece of bread and a draught from a special wine jar.

A further host bakery was built in Cape Town, South Africa, in 2003. It supplies the southern states in Africa with hosts, producing 240,000 of them per day.

==== Charitable work ====
Charitable and social work is growing in significance, including donations of food, medicine and clothing. Ministers hand on many donations. In poor countries and regions, Kindergartens, schools, orphanages, hospitals, retirement homes and clinics receive financial support. One such example is the "Amazing Grace" children's homes in South Africa. The church also supports interdenominational missionary and charitable organisations. The head office of NAK-karitativ, association for relief projects of the church, is located in Dortmund, Germany.

==== Regenbogen-NAK ====
An initiative group called Regenbogen-NAK (Rainbow-NAC in English) was founded in 1999 by gay, lesbian, and transsexual believers of the NAC. The main issues are the particular problems which affect them in public and in the church. The committee for special affairs of the church holds a dialog with the German and Swiss representatives. This does not mean that this group forms part of the NAC and maintains the website www.cms.regenbogen-nak.org.

==== nacworld ====
nacworld is the social networking website of the New Apostolic Church International, and enables Christians from all over the world to come into contact. It is geared towards members of the New Apostolic Church. Members of other churches or religious communities are also welcome to join, and the site is open to all who are interested. nacworld can be used in German, English, Spanish, French, Portuguese, and Dutch. A nacworld account is free of charge. There are no premium features, and nacworld has no income from advertising or sponsorship.

== Ecumenism ==
=== Historical development ===
Chief Apostle Richard Fehr (1988–2005) founded the Ecumenism Project Group in 1999 to represent the Church among other Christian denominations, establish contacts with other denominations and churches and involve the NAC in common activities and affairs. The church administration may consider changing some rather exclusive ecumenical doctrines, but they also have to maintain their own profile.

In 1963, the World Council of Churches asked Chief Apostle Schmidt to send some deputies to a session in Geneva, Switzerland. He declined the offer because the ecumenical movement of that time was not politically neutral and also because he feared the Roman Catholic Church would have too much control. Later on, he explained publicly that participating in ecumenism would have triggered conflicts and criticism between the church and larger denominations.

An interest in ecumenism only came about when Chief Apostle Hans Urwyler sought to contact other apostolic denominations. In 2000, Richard Fehr called an Apostolic Council which embraced discussion about common social and religious topics and interests. A general rapprochement between Apostolic denominations has been underway since 2005. This brought about some conflicts, but both sides want to continue and strive for reconciliation. All official "excommunications" of excluded members have now been cancelled.

In 1994 the church refused an ecumenical offer of Arbeitsgemeinschaft Christlicher Kirchen (English: Council of Christian Churches; today Churches Together in Britain and Ireland) with the justification that the ecumenical way of Christian unity would not be an appropriate way of religious life according to the sense and goals of Jesus Christ.

The Ecumenism Project Group has officially contacted other churches and has reached amicable relations with various congregations. The first dialogues were held in Southern Germany, where the New Apostolic congregations in Memmingen and Aschaffenburg have joined the ecumenical institution Arbeitsgemeinschaft Christlicher Kirchen. The New Apostolic district in Thun, Switzerland is also a guest member. The leaders of this institution published a brochure about the New Apostolic Church in April 2008. The church has had discussions with various other churches, including Methodists, Seventh-day Adventist Church, Anglican Church and the Roman Catholic Church. Although there are contacts and memberships in local communities there are no such on the regional or even national level in Germany where there is a strong opposition because of fundamental theological issues (services for the dead, exclusivity and nature of the church, the apostle ministry, etc.).

Ecumenical efforts are also underway in the US, Argentina and South Africa. The NAC is regarded as one of the national churches in Argentina. The District Apostles Freund and Barnes had meetings with deputies of other churches, leading to good results. The District Apostle of the US, Leonard Kolb, stated in an interview that New Apostolic Christians can learn a lot from other churches and that he will seek more ecumenical contacts.

=== Current standing ===
The New Apostolic Church is not currently a member of the World Council of Churches.

The New Apostolic Church allows all people, no matter their denomination, to participate in the Holy Communion. It also allows New Apostolic Christians to participate in the Eucharist of another church. The New Apostolic Christians pray the New King James Version of the Our Father since Pentecost 2008. This is very similar to most other churches.

The New Apostolic baptism is recognised by Protestant churches and the Roman Catholic Church because it is carried out in the name of the triune God. Also, the NAC recognises every baptism which is carried out in the name of the triune God and with water. This means that the NAC does not recognise baptism by Jehovah's Witnesses or Mormons. After noting this doctrinal change, Martin Baumann said the NAC seems to be becoming a free church.

The Church does not attend ecumenical divine services because the church administration regard acts of blessing as "not sharable". But they regard prayers or greetings at the altar as possible (e.g. during a wedding). If a New Apostolic Christian marries another Christian in their church, the blessing of that church is fully recognised. The New Apostolic Church lends its buildings to other denominations and makes the buildings available for public events. They also try to sell unused churches to religious organisations. The New Apostolic Church is considered modern and progressive in comparison with other free churches or religious groups.

The New Apostolic Church believes in the universal action of the Holy Spirit (Christian church), given the fact that elements of truth can be found in other Christian churches.

On 24 October 2005 Chief Apostle Leber encouraged ministers to engage in ecumenism, which means approaching one another and talking together.

== Reception ==
=== Membership ===
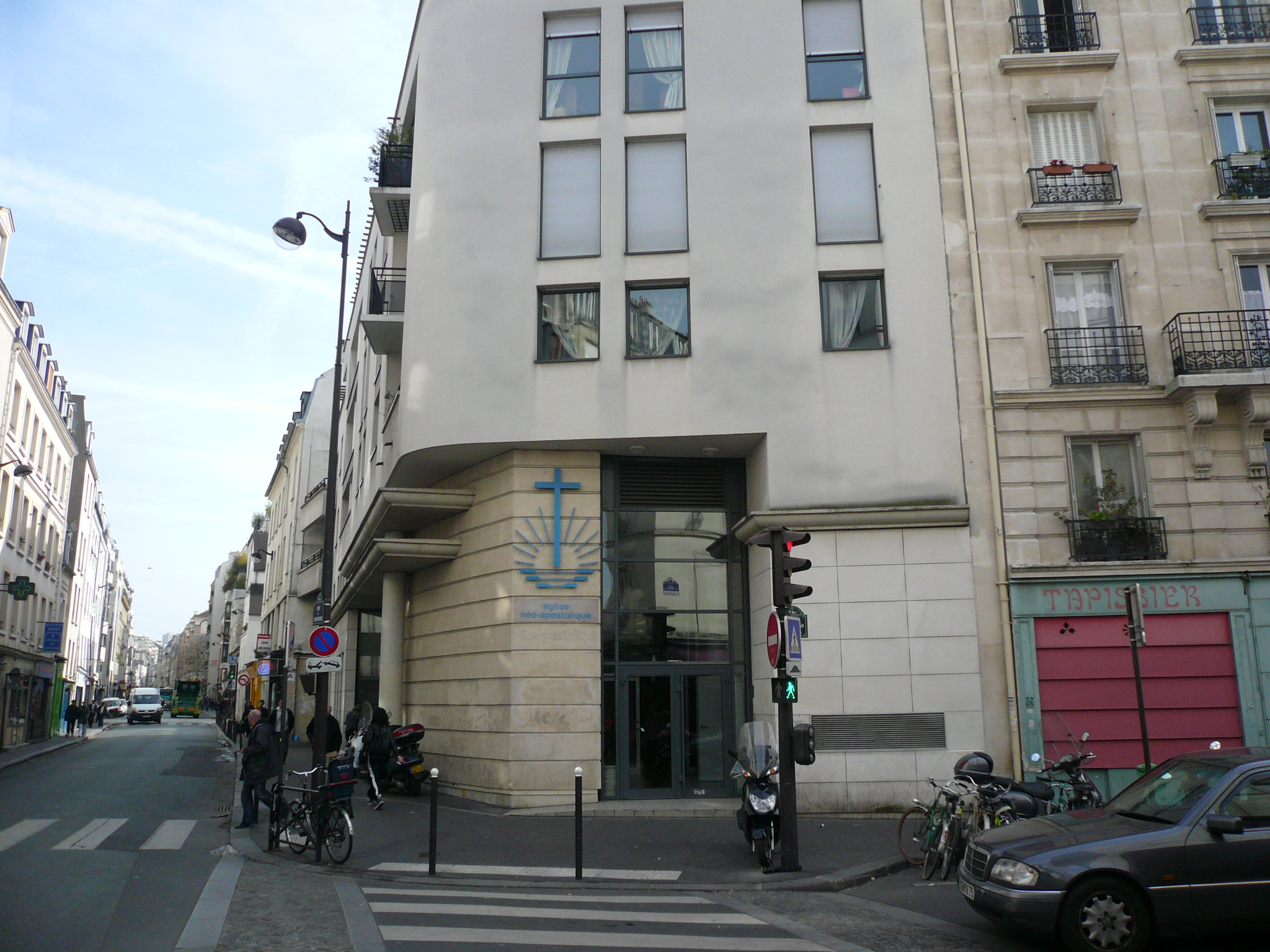
New Apostolic Church building in Paris, France

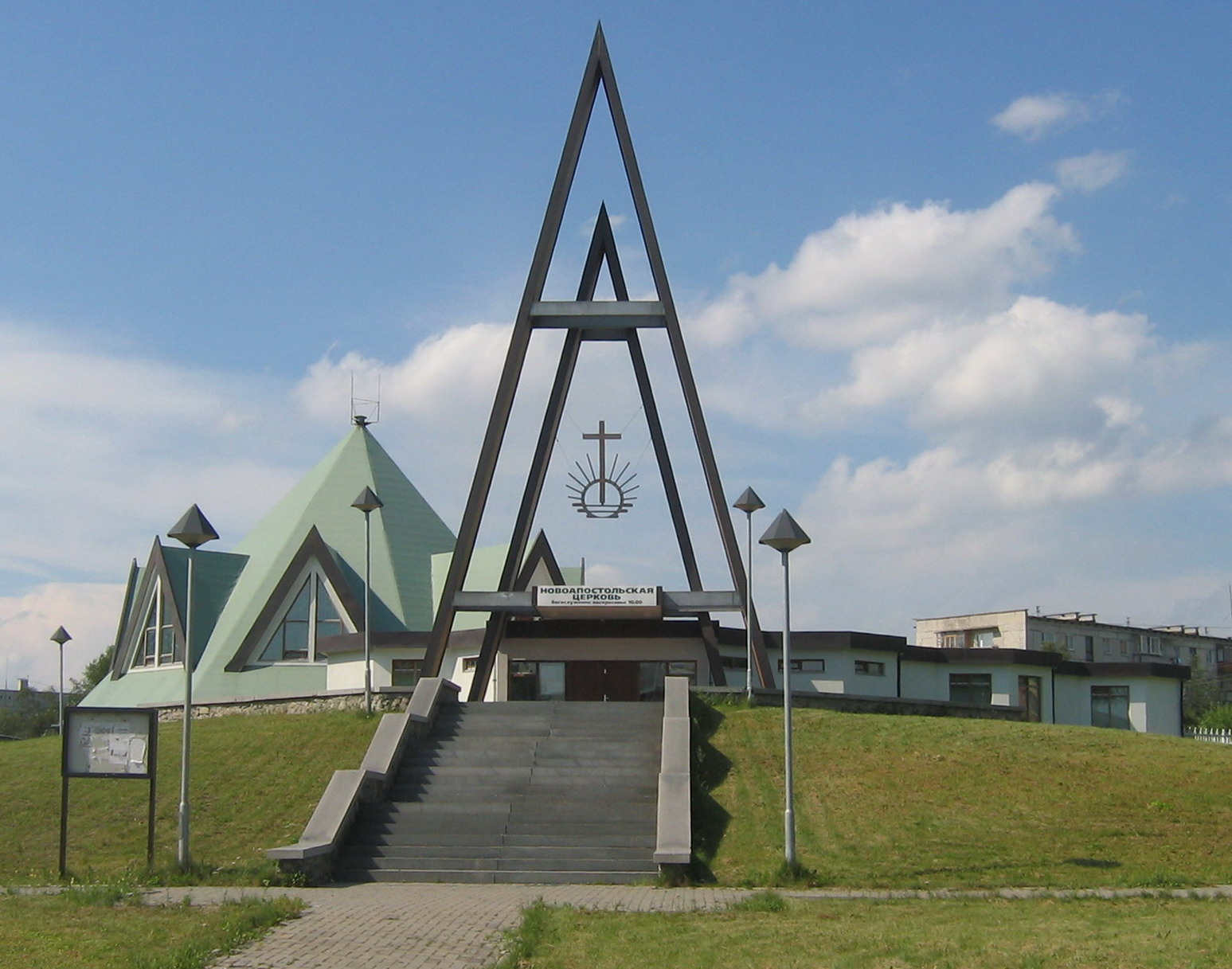
...in Krasnoturyinsk, Russia

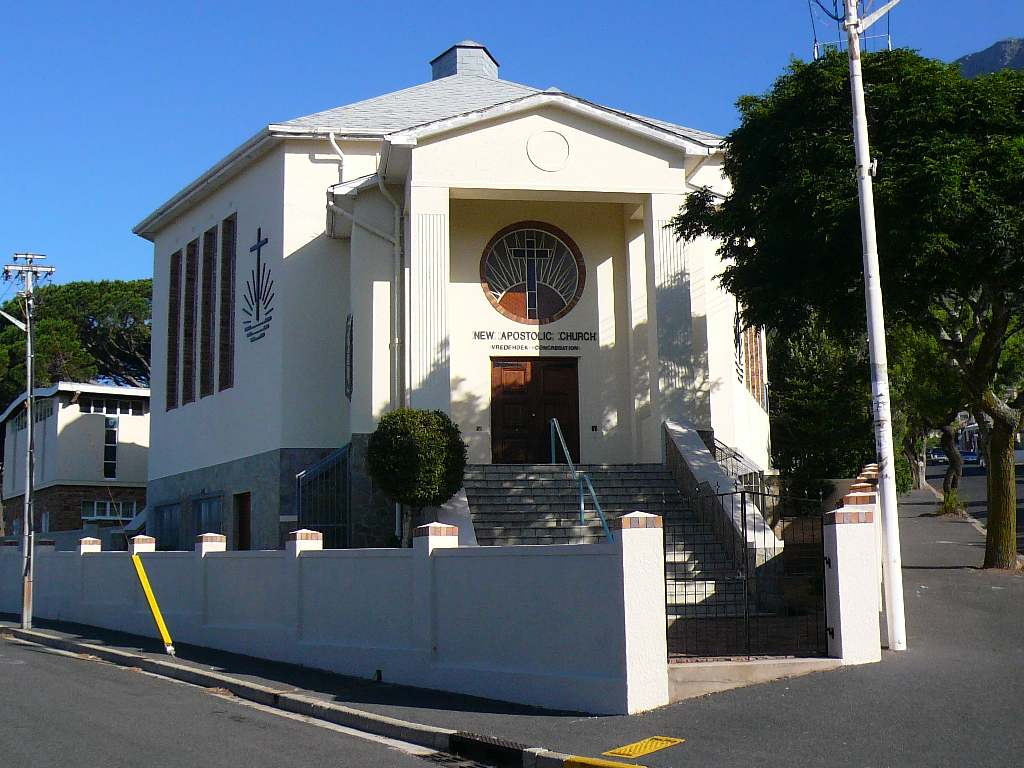
...in Cape Town, South Africa

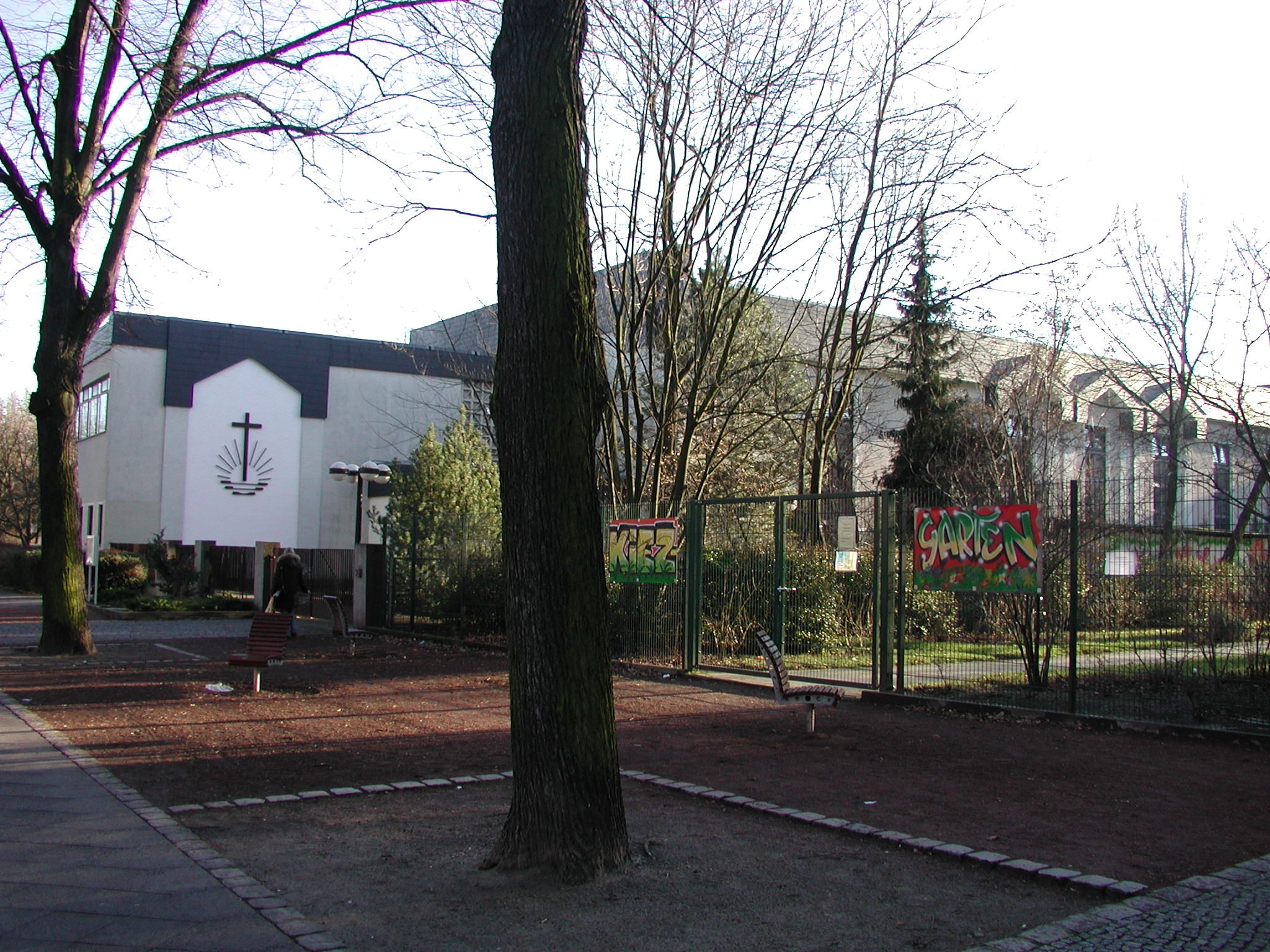
...in Berlin, Germany

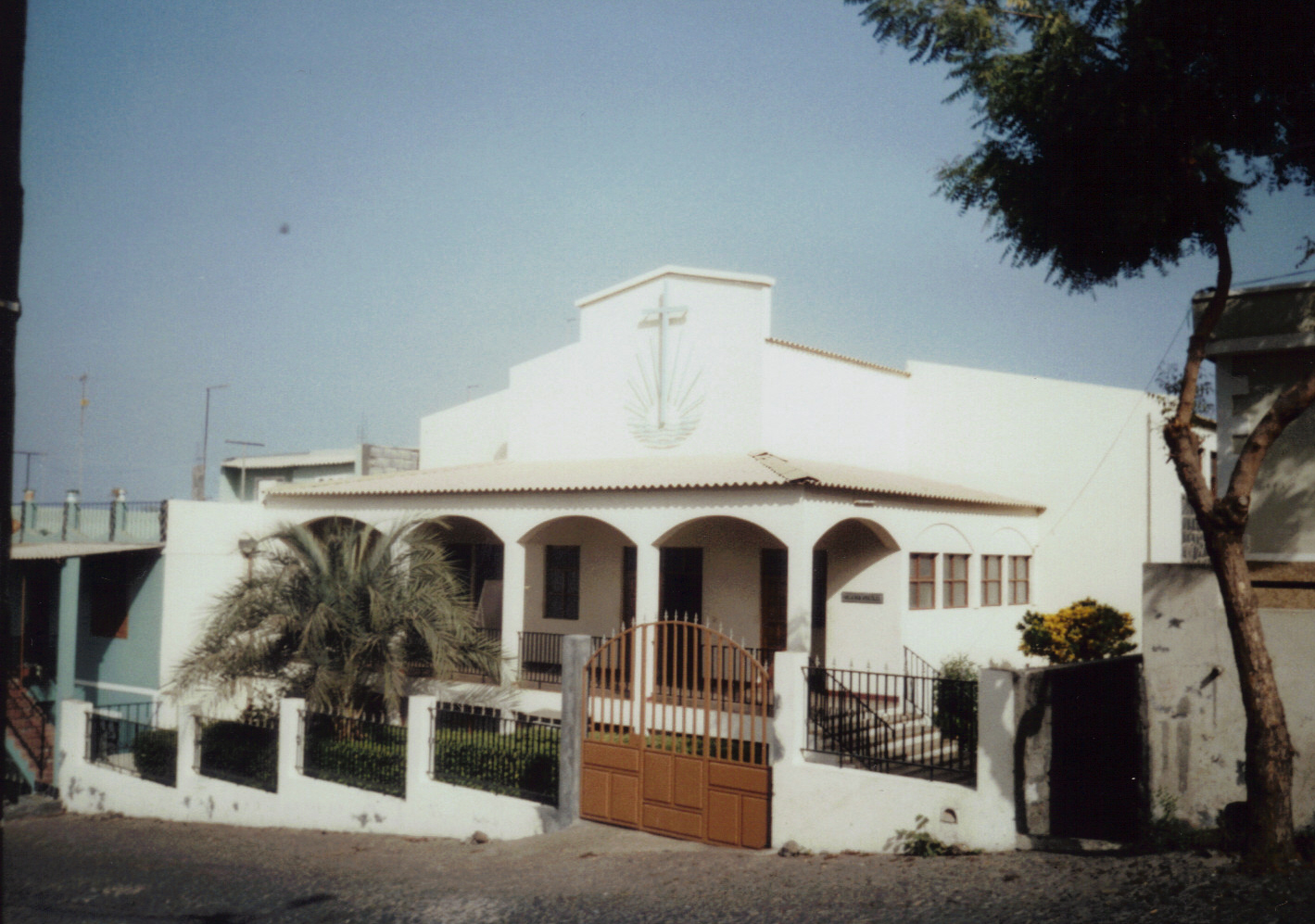
...in São Filipe on the island of Fogo, Cape Verde

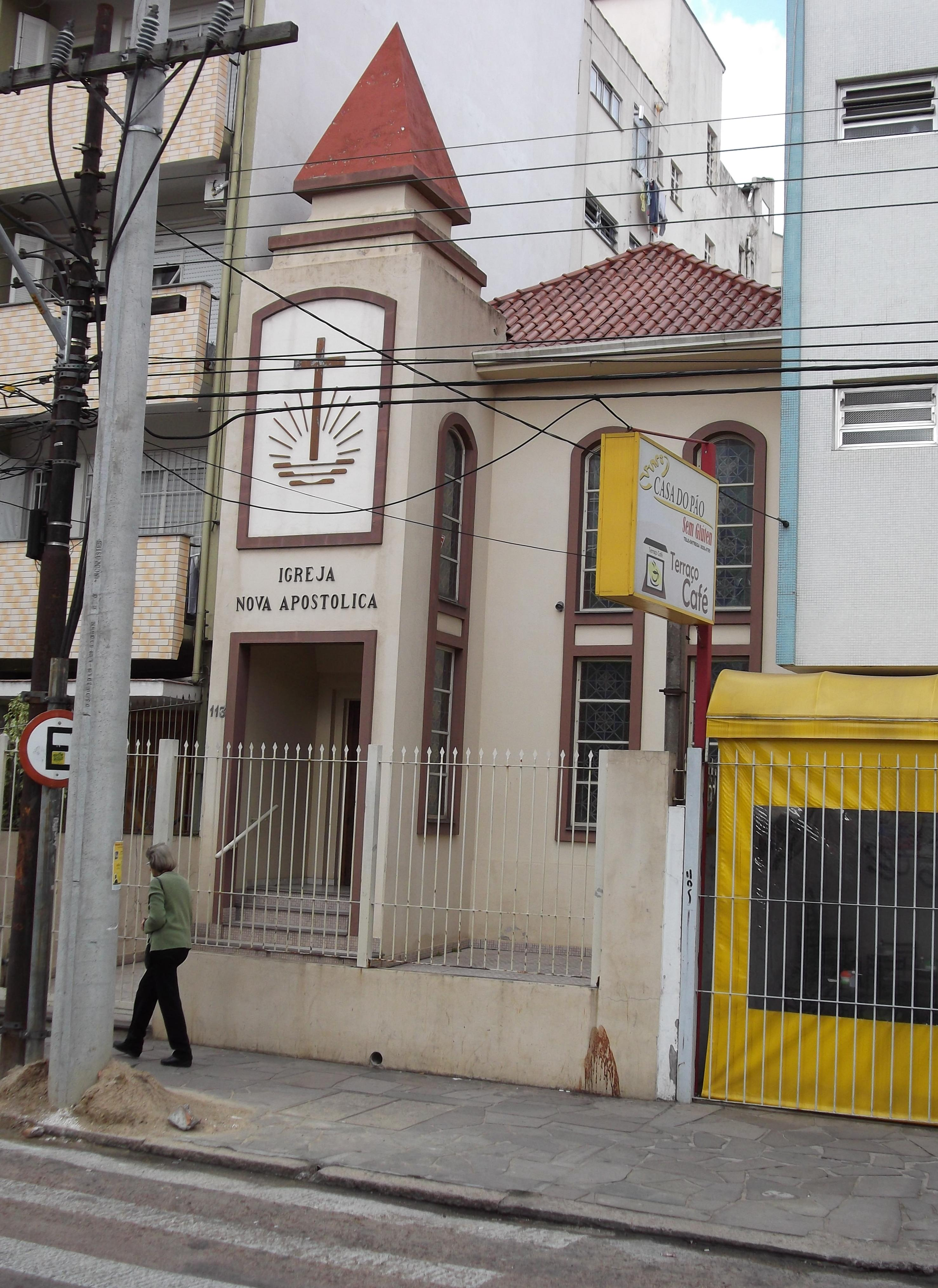
...in Porto Alegre, Brazil.

==== Current membership ====
In 2018, the New Apostolic Church claimed to have about 9 million members worldwide, thus being by far the largest Catholic Apostolic movement. The church's origins are in Europe, where about 475,000 New Apostolic Christians live. Almost 333,315 believers live in the origin country, Germany, and more than 5,200 in Austria. The church established itself in Switzerland in 1895 by founding the community of Zürich-Hauttingen. In 2009, Switzerland had 35,000 New Apostolic Church members in 218 communities. Membership in Central Europe is slightly decreasing due to obsolescence and emigration, whereas in Eastern Europe it is growing.

The largest number of New Apostolic Christians live in Africa. Nearly 3 million are located in the Democratic Republic of Congo, and roughly 12% of the inhabitants of Zambia are New Apostolic. The Church also maintains high membership in Ghana, Nigeria, Namibia, Angola, Kenya, Tanzania, Uganda, Mozambique and South Africa.

Nearly 600,000 members live in Asia. The New Apostolic faith initially was brought by European emigrants to Indonesia, where 20,000 believers live today. From the beginning of the 1970s, missionaries of the Church spread their faith in other countries as well. Most Asian believers live in India and Pakistan. About 25,000 believers live in China, and 15,000 in Thailand.

The New Apostolic Church in North America was built by German ministers in the 1870s who had emigrated to the United States or Canada. The church has grown in the United States, counting 35,000 members in the country in 1994. The church has grown from its beginnings, especially among the population of German immigrants.

Some German ministers emigrated to Southern Argentina in the 1920s, where they evangelised to other European emigrants. Most of the more than 200,000 believers in Argentina today are a result of this. There are 60,000 believers living in Brazil and 35,000 in Peru.

There are 360 apostles of the church more than the half living in Africa.

- Out of 9 million believers:
  - 77.9% live in Africa.
  - 12.8% live in Asia.
  - 4.4% live in Europe.
  - 3.6% live in South America.
  - 0.9% live in Australia and Oceania.
  - 0.4% live in North America.
- Membership in Anglophone countries:
  - Great Britain, 2,722 (2005)
  - USA, 37,514 (2005)
  - Canada, 13,315 (2007)
  - Australia, more than 100,000 (2008)
  - South Africa, 440,000 (2008)

==== Chronology of worldwide membership ====
The change in the numbers of believers between 1960 and 2025 is as follows:

Year	Worldwide	Africa	America	Asia	Australia	Europe
1960	524,341	97,370	46,047	3,443	1,199	376,282
1970	744,194	168,303	85,861	6,569	1,870	481,591
1980	1,758,525	519,595	146,354	592,840	27,841	471,895
1990	5,936,610	3,193,905	298,104	1,897,694	59,923	486,984
2000	9,913,250	7,375,139	403,892	1,517,030	87,040	530,149
2002	10,387,378	7,912,428	419,533	1,441,545	91,118	522,754
2004	10,811,754	8,308,006	438,789	1,451,237	94,615	519,107
2007	11,239,935	8,758,430	461,233	1,436,190	103,567	480,515*
2018	9,034,428	7,611,903	231,697	585,977	129,818	475,033*
2025	9,508,089	8,275,269	232,152	430,961	145,625	424,082

==== Sociological profile ====
According to a survey led in 2008 by Namini and Murken, the high number (43%) of young NAC members under 15 who had lost their fathers could be explained by the theology of the father and the figure of the Chief Apostle at the top of the hierarchy.

==== Former criticism ====
By the 1990s, the church was fighting the following controversies which made them look like a sect in public.

Resting upon the statement that only direct discipleship leads to eternal life, the Primitive Church established a system of obedience toward Jesus' apostles just after Jesus' death. The strict thought of obedience toward the apostle ministry is intended to continue this tradition. The social instruction strictly to obey a predecessor was so distinct that members had to obtain information from their leaders. That information bound them, if only unconsciously, so that the ministers controlled the lives of many members, telling them that their information matched God's will.

A new generation of free thinkers appeared in Europe in the 1950s, but that development passed by the church. This was partly because the church publicly withdrew into a defensive position through fear of attacks from other churches, and thus social change became impossible. That dictatorial hierarchy remained until the 1980s and the ecumenical opening. The linking of obedience in faith to participation in the Second Coming of Christ was often strongly criticised.

From the beginning of the 20th century until the ecumenical opening under Chief Apostle Hans Urwyler, some common prohibitions from ministers became known internally as "rules" e.g.: having a television; going to discos, cinemas or sporting events; growing a beard or long hair for men; women wearing jeans or shorts during church attendance; making a journey outside the church or marrying someone from outside the church, from "the world". Ministers often threatened members that if they did not follow these rules they would not get to participate in the Second Coming of Christ. Although the majority ignored those rules from the beginning, it resulted in psychological problems for others even under Chief Apostle Fehr.

Numerous former members, especially in Germany, criticised the Church for confining women to roles such as church cleaning, parental tasks such as Sunday school, and choir participation. Recently, New Apostolic women have been granted much greater importance. Women in several congregations have partly taken over the tasks of deacons or administrators. (Although women cannot be ordained ministers (no longer factual)), this point of criticism is no longer topical. Some critics charge that there were ministers who held out the prospect of divine blessing to donors, while threatening to deny blessing to those who did not donate.

However, the death of Chief Apostle Bischoff triggered a slow but continual change, which brought, among other things, the term self-reliance – every single believer is personally responsible for the salvation of his soul – by Chief Apostle Urwyler in 1986. This has led to contacts with other churches, especially religious groups who split from NAC because of the Botschaft. The spectrum has broadened in the last ten years and made it apparent there is a conservative wing and a liberal wing among the church members.

The French Commission on Cults registered the New Apostolic Church as a cult in its reports in 1995 and 1999 (see Governmental lists of cults and sects). In 1997, the Belgian parliamentary commission established a list of 189 movements, including the New Apostolic Church. In its report of 2001, the Mission Interministérielle de Lutte contre les Sectes did not agree with the official recognition of the New Apostolic Church in 1984 in New Caledonia.

==== Current criticism ====
===== Historical events =====
Many former members criticise the behaviour of the church at the time of the Botschaft as the most controversial subject in New Apostolic history. Furthermore, the official political attitude toward the regimes of Nazi Germany and in the German Democratic Republic (GDR) are heavily questioned, which seems to be a result of ignorance. Independent historians from various Apostolic churches investigated these topics, providing reliable and objective results.

===== Criticism from other churches =====
The Protestant and Roman Catholic churches criticise the following doctrinal points, which have not yet been rejected: the assertion that the New Apostolic apostle ministry corresponds with that of the Primitive Church, and the doctrine that genuine kinship to God can only be received by the New Apostolic apostle ministry.

The beliefs about the dead also cause trouble, but the NAC has a chance to explain that via ecumenical approaches. Another criticism is that the hierarchy of the church has no theological education. Religious scholar Georg Schmid considers the NAC sermons monotone with little depth and virtually no exegesis or theology.

The important role of the Chief Apostle, frequently identified with Christ, is often criticised by mainstream Christianity. For example, in a hymnal published by the Church in 1933, 106 songs out of 200 were devoted to the apostle.

===== Handling of criticism =====
Siegfried Dannwolf, former member from Germany, describes in his book Gottes verlorene Kinder how he was defamed with lies and misrepresentations in his congregation after he left the church. "Even my wife didn't believe me anymore. 'That figures', says Dannwolf. 'The problem goes beyond the family, marriages break up. I haven't had any contact with my parents for years.'" Further possible mental consecutive symptoms of membership in the NAC and individual difficulties of quitting are described by Olaf Stoffel in his book Angeklagt.

"It is quite a difference, whether a tree withers at the roots and thus is the entire tree lost, or whether some branches which have withered break away from the tree", commented Chief Apostle Schmidt on the importance of single critics who have left the church.

This is also confirmed by the cult commissioner of the Roman Catholic Archdiocese of Freiburg, Albert Lampe. He sees no comparison with dangerous groups such as Scientology, because "for this, there are too many New Apostolic Christians leading a normal life and not standing in absolute dependence".

Chief Apostle Leber explained at a news conference, what adjustments he would undertake and how he would take criticism, "In the past individual persons or groups have spread a vehement temper against the church. The peak of that criticism of former members was over long ago. (...) But we have learned as well to be able to take criticism. This must be learned, this is a process as well". On the point "readiness to engage in dialogue" he said, "If there are factual requests, I will always espouse that answers are given. For this, I will always be on hand. But if frontiers of fair contact were trespassed or polemical arguments appear, a continuation of the dialogue would make no sense then".

== Splinter groups ==
After Apostle Preuss' death in 1878, a dispute over succession caused a separation between the majority of Hamburg's congregation with Prophet Heinrich Geyer and Apostle Johann Friedrich Gueldner on one side (still under the name Allgemeine christliche apostolische Mission) and the Apostles Friedrich Wilhelm Menkhoff, Eduard Wichmann, and Fritz Krebs on the other.

The second schism occurred with the HAZK in 1897 in the Netherlands due to the introduction of the office of the Chief Apostle. by the group following the Chief Apostle adopted the name Hersteld Apostolische Zendinggemeente in de Eenheid der Apostelen (HAZEA) after the schism of 1897 and continued to use it until the 1960s.

Australian Apostle H. F. Niemeyer and later Carl Georg Klibbe began to criticise the worshipping of Chief Apostle Hermann Niehaus' person, resulting in Niehaus' announcement of Wilhelm Schlaphoff as Klibbe's replacement in 1913. Another point of view says this was a misunderstanding. The ship on which Klibbe was believed to be traveling, after a conference of apostles, sank. He was believed to have drowned, although he had actually chosen another ship. Nevertheless, Schlaphoff declined to resign his apostle ministry.

After his exclusion, Klibbe went on working under the name New Apostolic Church. In 1926, an agreement was reached between the followers of Klibbe and Schlaphoff. As part of the settlement, Klibbe renamed the church he had founded in 1889 as Old Apostolic Church of Africa. According to court papers filed, the Klibbe group became independent from the New Apostolic Church in 1915. At the time of Klibbe's death in 1931 the Old Apostolic Church had more than 1 million adherents.

On 10 October 1920 Chief Apostle Hermann Niehaus appointed Apostle J. G. Bischoff as Chief Apostle Helper and on 14 December 1924 he assigned Bischoff to succeed him, even though the Saxon Apostle Carl August Brueckner had already been declared as his successor. After 1914, Niehaus was led more and more by emotions, dreams and visions. Brueckner became the focus for all those who criticised the spiritual views of the Chief Apostle and the worshipping of his person. The different opinions led to the exclusion of Apostle Brueckner and several thousand believers in 1921. The excluded founded the Reformiert-Apostolischer Gemeindebund. A further schism occurred when the Australian Apostle Niemeyer was excluded from the church on his way home after a conference of apostles. Like Brueckner, he had opposed the claim to power of the Chief Apostle. After his return he founded the Apostolic Church of Queensland. As a reaction to these crisis-struck times, Niehaus had all of the apostles cast a vote of confidence in him and gathered them in his own association, the Apostelkollegium der Neuapostolischen Gemeinden Deutschland.

Other splits of the New Apostolic Church occurred in Switzerland (Vereinigung Apostolischer Christen), South Africa – again (Apostle Unity), and the Netherlands, where a large group of 26,500 members, forming 90% of total membership, left the New Apostolic Church in 194 founding the Apostolic Society (Apostolisch Genootschap) and later again approximately 1200 Dutch members left in 1954 (Apostolische Geloofsgemeenschap), and in West Germany (Apostolische Gemeinschaft and Apostolische Gemeinde des Saarlandes) in 1955 due to a 1951 teaching of the then-Chief Apostle Bischoff. This teaching presumed that he would not die before Jesus Christ returned to take the predestined into his kingdom (First Resurrection). In 1954 this teaching, called Botschaft, became an official dogma. Those ministers, especially the apostles who declined to preach this, even after several interlocutions, lost their offices and were excluded from the New Apostolic Church. Chief Apostle Bischoff died in 1960 without his prophecy being fulfilled but there was no restoration of the excommunicated ministers. The various communities and congregations like the Apostolic Church of Queensland or the Apostolic Church of South Africa – Apostle Unity which evolved out of these conflicts in different countries merged in 1956 as the United Apostolic Church.

Another, earlier, split was the break with the Apostelamt Juda in 1902, from which the Apostelamt Jesu Christi emerged.

On 1 May 2005, a document of the first steps of reconciliation was signed by the Swiss New Apostolic Church and the United Apostolic Church in Switzerland (Vereinigung Apostolischer Christen).

== Bibliography ==
=== Publications by NAC ===
- New Acts of the Apostles NAKI Verlag Friedrich Bischoff Frankfort am Main 1985
- History of the New Apostolic Church G. Rockenfelder, editor Verlag Friedrich Bischoff Frankfort am Main 1970
- Questions and Answers concerning the New Apostolic Faith NAKI Verlag Friedrich Bischoff Frankfort am Main [ed unknown]
- History of the Kingdom of God v. I & v. II Apostles College of the New Apostolic Church, Verlag Friedrich Bischoff Frankfort am Main 1971 (vI) 1973 (vII)

== See also ==
- Twelve Apostles
- Religion in Germany
- Apostolic Church of South Africa - Apostle Unity
