= Apostolic Church =

Apostolic Church may refer to:

== Early church and general ==
- In the history of Christianity, the church of the Apostolic Age (1st century AD)
- Any apostolic see, being any episcopal see whose foundation is attributed to one or more of the apostles of Jesus
- Any one of the major Christian churches claiming apostolic succession, e.g., the Catholic Church, the churches of the Anglican Communion, the Eastern Orthodox Church, the Oriental Orthodox Churches, and the Assyrian Church of the East.

== Pentecostal denominations ==
  - Apostolic Faith Church, headquartered in Portland, Oregon, US
  - Apostolic Church (1916 denomination), formed in Wales
    - Apostolic Church Nigeria, a group that is part of the 1916 denomination
  - Apostolic Church (Czech Republic)
  - Apostolic Church (Slovakia)
  - Apostolic Assembly of the Faith in Christ Jesus, California, US
  - Apostles of Johane Maranke, an African church movement that began in Rhodesia in 1925

== Others ==
- Armenian Apostolic Church, the Oriental Orthodox national church of Armenia
- Apostolic Christian Church, worldwide Christian denomination in the Anabaptist tradition
  - Apostolic Christian Church of America
  - Apostolic Christian Church (Nazarene)
- Catholic Apostolic Church, formed in 1835, the church movement associated with Edward Irving
  - Old Apostolic Church, Christian faith community with roots in the Catholic Apostolic Church
  - Reformed Old Apostolic Church, South Africa
  - New Apostolic Church, formed in 1863, a chiliastic Christian church that split from the Catholic Apostolic Church during an 1863 schism in Hamburg, Germany
  - United Apostolic Church, independent communities in the tradition of the Catholic Apostolic revival started at the beginning of the 19th century in England and Scotland, including
    - Apostolic Church of Queensland, Australia
    - Apostolic Church of South Africa – Apostle Unity

== See also ==
- Catholic Apostolic Church (disambiguation)
- Apostle (disambiguation)
