= Agustín de Betancourt =

Spanish engineer (1758–1824)

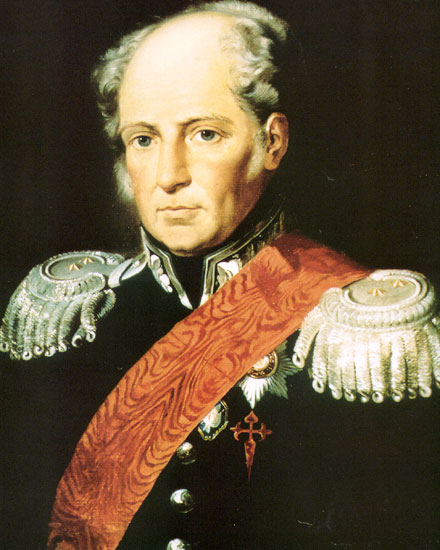
- 1810s portrait
- Born: Agustín José Pedro del Carmen Domingo de Candelaria de Betancourt y Molina; 1 February 1758; Puerto de la Cruz, Spain
- Died: 14 July 1824 (aged 66); Saint Petersburg, Russia
- Education: École nationale des ponts et chaussées
- Occupations: Civil engineer; architect; military engineer; urbanist; inventor
- Engineering career
- Significant design: Moscow Manege, Nizhny Novgorod Fair

Agustín de Betancourt y Molina (Note: Russian: Августин Августинович де Бетанкур, romanized: Avgustin Avgustinovich de Betankur; French: Augustin Bétancourt.) (1 February 1758 – 24 July 1824) was a Spanish engineer, who worked in Spain, France and Russia. His work ranged from steam engines and balloons to structural engineering and urban planning. As an educator, Betancourt founded and managed the Spanish Corps of Civil Engineers and the Saint Petersburg Institute of Communications Engineers. As an urban planner and construction manager, Betancourt supervised planning and construction in Saint Petersburg, Kronstadt, Nizhny Novgorod and other Russian cities.

== Childhood and education ==
De Betancourt was born on 1 February 1758, in Puerto de la Cruz, Tenerife, Spain. The Tenerife Betancourt family can trace their surname to Jean de Béthencourt, who launched colonization of the Canary Islands in 1402, although he himself had no issue (the family name being carried onwards by Native Canarians that were baptised with his). Augustín's father, also Augustín de Betancourt y Castro, was a well-educated businessman with interests in textile machinery. His sister, Maria del Carmen Betancourt y Molina, was the first known woman in Tenerife to publish a scientific article (also related to textile dyes).

In 1778, Augustin moved to Madrid to study engineering at the San Isidro Royal College, and never returned to Tenerife again. His first jobs, after graduation in 1783, were related to the Aragon Canal and mining in Almadén. In 1784, he travelled to Paris to study hydraulics and mechanics at the School of Bridges and Roads.

== Career in Spain and France ==
=== Intelligence missions ===
In France, Betancourt published treatises on engineering (e.g. on coal mining), but his real assignment was to scout new technologies for the benefit of Spain and to acquire modern machinery for the future Cabinet of Machinery in Madrid, envisioned by Chief minister Floridablanca. In 1788, he travelled to England, visiting James Watt and Matthew Boulton, pioneers in steam engines. Watt was reluctant to reveal the secrets of his trade, but Betancourt inspected Watt's engines working in London mills. Back in Paris, he wrote a treatise on steam engines and designed a steam-powered pump and a mechanical loom, also sending a collection of machinery to Madrid. In 1791, he concentrated on naval technologies – harbor dredging and drilling gun barrels (his own dredge design materialized twenty years later, in Kronstadt). Shortly before the fall of French monarchy, Betancourt returned to Madrid with his new finds.

In 1792, Betancourt was appointed the Director of the Royal Cabinet of Machinery, and catalogued hundreds of its exhibits scouted in France, England and the Netherlands. In 1793–1795, he continued intelligence in England. This assignment was interrupted by Spain's alliance with revolutionary France (1796). In Paris, Betancourt teamed up with Abraham-Louis Breguet in perfecting their version of the optical telegraph. Later however, the French chose a competing design by Claude Chappe. Betancourt built his telegraph in Spain, between Madrid and Cádiz in 1798. In 1783 he was involved in launching Spain's first hot-air balloon (the scene can be seen in a picture by A. Carnicero in the Prado national museum).

=== Administrative career ===
In 1797, Betancourt's achievements were rewarded with the positions of Chief Inspector of Ports and Communications in Spain, Chief of the Corps of Engineers of the Spanish military, and other important assignments. In 1802, he founded Spain's first civil engineering college, the School of the Corps of Engineers, and managed the institution until 1807.

Soon after the establishment in 1794 of the École Polytechnique in Paris, Gaspard Monge had proposed a class on the analysis of mechanisms and described the subject to fellow teachers. When the class was first taught in 1806 by Hachette, Betancourt was among its students. Another student was José María Lanz, whose lecture notes were revised and published together with Betancourt as Essai sur la composition des machines (1808; 2nd ed. 1819; 3rd ed. 1840), encouraged to do so by Monge and Hachette. This textbook on machine design became widespread in European universities. It was translated to English as Analytical essay of the construction of machines (1820, published by Rudolph Ackermann) and by Thomas Fenwick as Essays on practical mechanics (1822) and to German by Wilhelm Kreyher as Versuch über die Zusammensetzung der Maschinen (1829).

In 1807, Betancourt left Spain for Paris, where he was inducted into the French Academy of Sciences; ironically, James Watt was inducted simultaneously. Betancourt was recruited into Russian service by Ivan Muravyov-Apostol (Ambassador to Spain until 1806) and left France for Saint Petersburg in 1808.

== Career in Russia ==
Betancourt joined Russian service in the rank of Major General, assigned to the Directorate of Communications. His first extant work is the famous fountain in Tsarskoye Selo (1810), with sculpture by Pavel Sokolov immortalized by Alexander Pushkin's poetry. In 1816, Betancourt was promoted to head the Commission for Construction and Hydraulics, a national institution targeted primarily at Saint Petersburg development; since 1819 he also headed the Directorate of Communications. He recruited and trained such architects as Auguste de Montferrand and Leo Carboniere.

=== Structural engineering ===
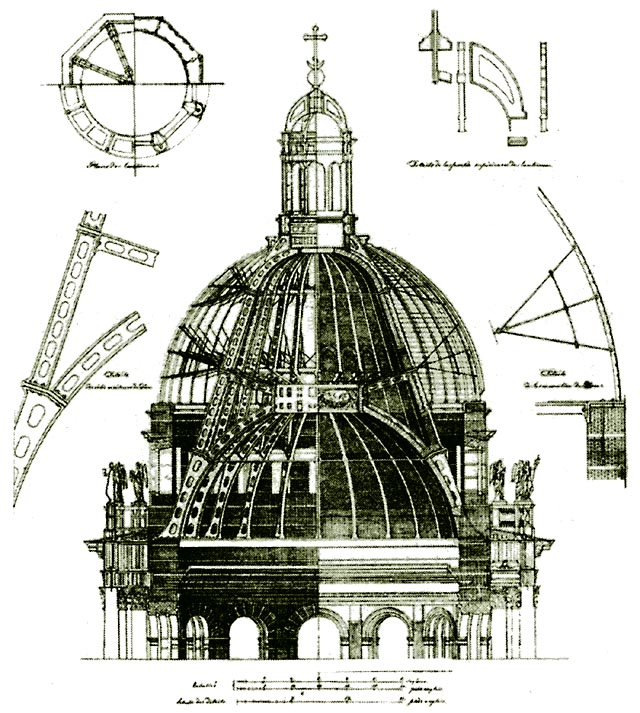
St. Isaac's dome structure, 1838

In 1811–1813, Betancourt built Saint Petersburg's first bridge across Malaya Nevka, connecting Kamenny Island with Aptekarsky Island that is known as Kamennoostrovsky Bridge now. This seven-span wooden bridge, named after Betancourt, served for a record fifty years and was the only wooden bridge to survive the disastrous 1824 flood. He designed similar bridges for Warsaw, Tula and Peterhof.

In 1816, Alexander I of Russia assigned Betancourt to find an architect for rebuilding Saint Isaac's Cathedral. Betancourt promoted Montferrand and, in February 1818, the Tsar approved Montferrand's fifth draft. Betancourt provided Montferrand with an efficient, thoroughly calculated dome design utilizing three interconnected steel domes without any masonry vaults. Cathedral construction was delayed until Betancourt's death; the dome was erected only in 1841.

In Moscow, Betancourt supervised construction of the Moscow Manege (1817). Architectural design was assigned to Leo Carboniere. The building, 166 meters long and 44.7 meters wide, required a single-span roof without any internal columns. Betancourt personally designed the wooden roof trusses and completed the whole project in six months. By 1824, roofing required replacement; new trusses, installed in 1824–1825, served until the fire of 2004.

=== Urban planning ===
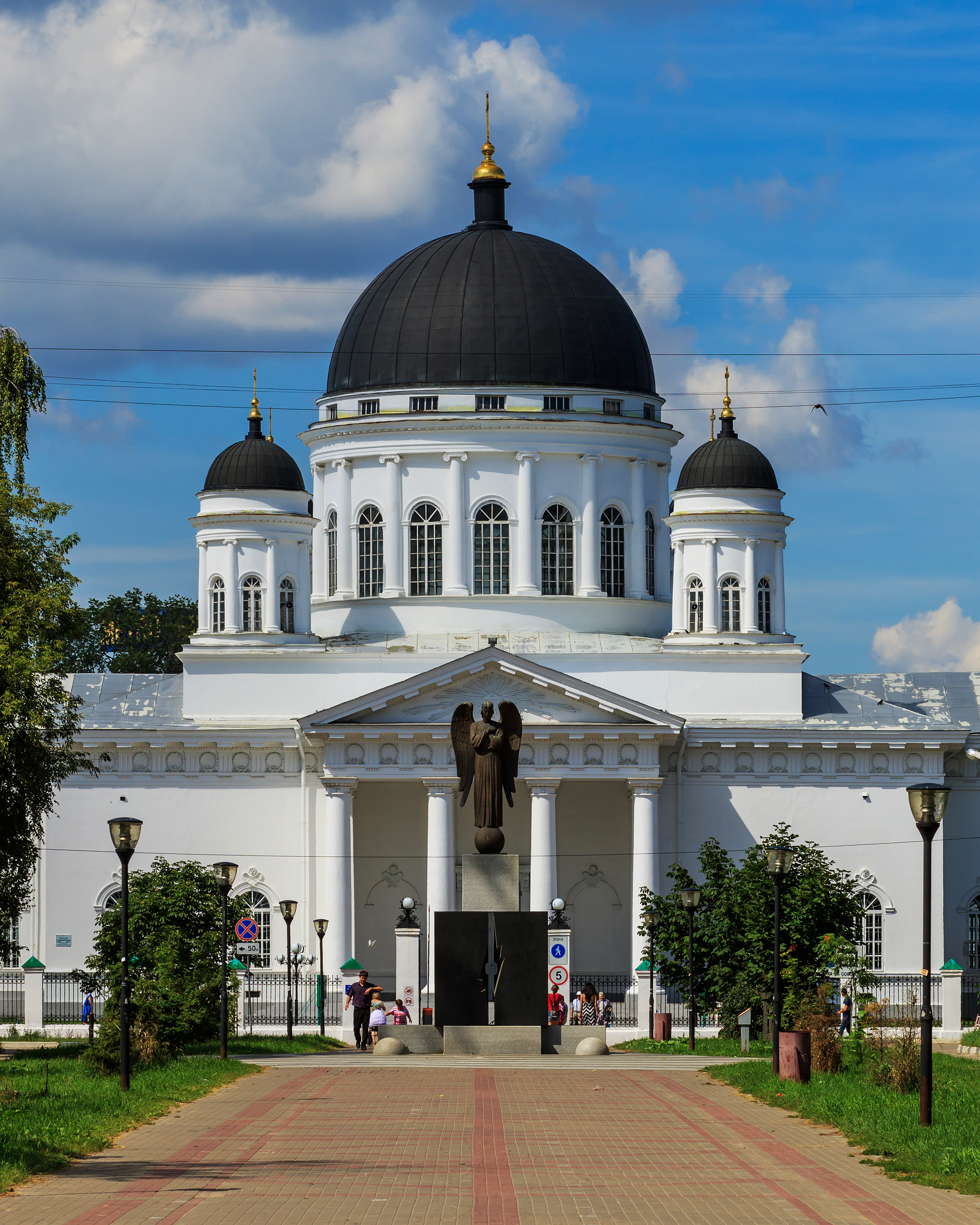
Saviour (Old Fair) Cathedral

In 1816, accidental fire destroyed the Makaryev Fair. The Fairgrounds were transferred to Nizhny Novgorod, equipped with temporary wooden shacks. Betancourt visited the site in 1817 and proposed a six million rouble, four-year project to rebuild the Fair in stone. He supervised overall planning and financing, while Montferrand, as the chief architect, was designing individual buildings and ensembles. Despite his Petersburg projects, Betancourt travelled to Nizhny Novgorod every year to inspect the progress of construction. The Saviour Cathedral, also known as Old Fair Cathedral (Спасский собор, Староярмарочный собор), was designed by Betancourt (overall structure) and Montferrand (facade and interiors) together and completed in 1822, the year when the Nizhny Novgorod Fair opened for its first season. The fair operated until 1930.

Betancourt designed other buildings for Nizhny, including the city jail, three brick foundries, and helped in preservation of two ancient churches. Throughout the 19th century, the left bank of Oka River was developing according to his master plan.

=== Naval engineering ===
Russia's first steamship, Yelizaveta was designed jointly by Charles Baird and Betancourt (1815).

In 1810, Betancourt completed his steam-powered dredge. It was used to deepen the shallow waters around Kronstadt and build a canal between this island and the Izhorsky foundries on the mainland. He could not patent the design immediately, because Russian patent law was enacted later, in 1812; eventually, patent was granted to completely different people.

=== Currency printshop ===
After the French invasion of Russia (1812), Russian monetary system was ruined by war expenditure and a flood of counterfeit bills. Dmitry Guriev, Minister of Finance, assigned Betancourt to set up a modern currency printing facility. By 1816, Betancourt examined all existing printshop and persuaded the government to build a new factory equipped with steam-driven machinery. He designed the buildings, machinery and the technological process, using his childhood experience in textile mills. The new printshop (present-day Saint Petersburg Goznak) was inaugurated in 1818.

=== Other projects ===
Betancourt is credited with design of Russia's first modern highway between Saint Petersburg and Moscow, as well as numerous industrial projects like Tula and Kazan armouries.

In 1809, Betancourt set up the Saint Petersburg Institute of Communications Engineers, the nations' first engineering college, and headed the Institute until 1824.

== Final years ==
In 1822, Betancourt fell into disfavor at the court, and lost his chair as the Director of Communications, but retained other state jobs. In 1823 he was struck by the death of his only daughter and never recovered from this loss. In February 1824 he finally resigned, and died on 14 July 1824 in Saint Petersburg, Russia. He was buried at the Smolensk Lutheran cemetery in Saint Petersburg. His tomb, a 6.85-meter cast-iron column, was designed and made by Auguste de Montferrand and paid for by Nizhny Novgorod merchant society. In 1979, the grave was relocated to the Lazarevskoe Cemetery in the Alexander Nevsky Lavra.

Saint Petersburg has three monuments to Betancourt: in University Embankment, in Communications University and inside the Goznak currency printshop. Betancourt's Medal is an annual award instituted in 1997 by Russian Railways for excellence in science and education.

== Sources ==
- Russian bio: Ренкель, А., "Бетанкур — россиянин с острова Тенерифе", "Изобретатель и рационализатор" N.12(684), 2006
- Russian bio, focusing on currency printing: Воробьева, Ольга, "Он научил Россию печатать деньги", "Водяной знак", N.7-8(15-16), 2004
