= Apostle (disambiguation) =

Apostle, an anglicization of the Greek ἀπόστολος (apóstolos), refers to a messenger or ambassador.

Apostle may also refer to:

== Religion ==
- Apostles in the New Testament, the primary apostles of Jesus Christ
- Apostle (Latter Day Saints), a position in The Church of Jesus Christ of Latter-day Saints
- Chief Apostle, highest minister in the New Apostolic Church
- Seventy disciples, also known as the Seventy Apostles by the Eastern Orthodox Church
- Apostles (Manichaeism)
- Apostle (Islam), Islamic prophet or messenger
- Apostles of Bahá'u'lláh, nineteen early followers of Bahá'u'lláh

== Entertainment ==
=== Film and television ===
- Apostle (film), a 2018 period horror film directed by Gareth Evans
- The Apostles (film), a 2014 Chinese film
- The Apostle, a 1997 film directed by and starring Robert Duvall
- El Apóstol, the world's oldest animated feature film, 1917
- Apostle (production company), a television production company founded by Jim Serpico and Denis Leary

=== Music ===
- The Apostles (band), a punk rock band from the 1980s
- The Apostles, a 1960s British rock band later known as The Snobs
- The Apostles (Elgar), a 1903 choral work by Edward Elgar

=== Other ===
- The Apostle (novel), a spy novel by Brad Thor
- The 7 Apostles, characters from the Chrono Crusade manga series

== Other uses ==
- Apostle Islands, in Lake Superior
- Apostle plant, the plant genus Neomarica, which closely resemble irises
- Cambridge Apostles, a secret society at the University of Cambridge

== See also ==
- Apostol (disambiguation)
- Apostolic (disambiguation)
- Apostolic Age
- Apostolos (disambiguation)
- Apostle of Mercy (disambiguation)
- Twelve Apostles (disambiguation)
