= Apostolic Church of South Africa – Apostle Unity =

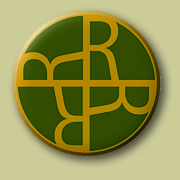
Logo of the Apostolic Church (Apostle Unity)

The Apostolic Church of South Africa – Apostle Unity is the South African branch of the United Apostolic Church. It has roots in the Catholic Apostolic Church of the early 19th century. It was founded in 1955 as a schism of the New Apostolic Church. It is part of a branch of Christianity called Irvingism and is separate from Protestantism.

It is a member church of the United Apostolic Church, which was founded in Düsseldorf, Germany in 1956 after several apostles of the New Apostolic Church were excommunicated for refusing to accept the teachings of the Chief Apostle that Jesus Christ would return in his lifetime.

Its logo is a four R-symbol, which is also used by the Australian sister church, The Apostolic Church of Queensland. The four "R"s stand for: Right, Royal, Righteous and Rich. Right according to the Bible, Royal as the Bride to have membership with Christ, Righteous in partaking of the body and blood of Christ and Rich in the promises Christ gave to his apostles.

== History ==
=== History of the Klibbe group ===
In 1889, Evangelist Carl George Klibbe arrived in South Africa to begin his mission work for the Apostolic Church. He was ordained as an Apostle in 1893 by Apostle H.F. Niemeyer of Australia. At that time, the office of Chief Apostle had not been established and each Apostle functioned independently from one another. Due to the personality cult of Chief Apostle Hermann Niehaus, Niemeyer separated himself from the German branch of the Church and founded The Apostolic Church of Queensland in 1912. In 1913, Klibbe was excommunicated from the New Apostolic Church. He then founded the New Apostolic Church (Africa). Klibbe later renamed the church the Old Apostolic Church of Africa. Also in 1913, he ordained his son-in-law H. Velde as priest in Swakopmund, Namibia. Velde was sent to Johannesburg. Later he was ordained as elder and as an evangelist.

Apostle H.F. Niemeyer died in 1920, and was succeeded by his son, Wilhelm Niemeyer. A break occurred between the young Niemeyer and Klibbe when, in 1925, Apostle Wilhelm Niemeyer appointed Hendrik Velde as Apostle for Africa, and Velde and his followers founded a separate Church from Klibbe, named The Apostolic Church of South Africa. On 27 September 1956 Velde died after a traffic accident in Wynberg, Cape Town.

=== Ecommunicated group of the New Apostolic Church ===
Due to the "Botschaft" of the Chief Apostle Johann Gottfried Bischoff, the New Apostolic Church suffered serious conflicts in the 1950s. In 1954, the apostles Philippus Jacobus Erasmus (1904–1960) and D.C.S. Malan (1918–1968) were excommunicated. Heinrich Franz Schlaphoff (1894–1965) resigned from his office as Apostle. They administered a prosperous district of about 60,000 members. They founded the Apostolic Church and many members of the New Apostolic Church followed them.

=== Union ===
The sudden death of Apostle Velde caused them to cancel a previously arranged meeting with the excommunicated group. The Australian Apostle Zielke asked Elder Petersen of the Apostolic Church of South Africa to meet with the excommunicated Apostles Erasmus and Malan. In Cape Town, they reached an agreement on 23 November 1956 to merge the two churches. About 800 members and three church buildings were brought into the new Apostolic Church (Apostle Unity) from the Klibbe group. In July 1956, the excommunicated group joined the newly founded International Federation of the United Apostolic Church.

On 14 May 1972, two new apostles were ordained: Johannes Philippus Erasmus (1943) and Josua Jeremia Joubert (1932). In 1978, Philippus Jacobus Erasmus retired. He died on 26 October 1986. In 1989, a mission was opened in the homeland of Venda. In February 1993, the congregations celebrated their centenary. At the end of July 1997, Apostle Joubert retired.

=== Administration ===
The church is divided into 10 districts with 34 parishes which are mainly situated in the provinces of Western Cape, Gauteng, North West, Polokwane, Eastern Cape, Northern Cape, Free State, KwaZulu-Natal and Mpumalanga. The church's headquarters is located in Johannesburg in Gauteng province.
