= Apostolos (given name) =

Apostolos (Greek: Απόστολος) or Apostolis (Αποστόλης) is a common male Greek given name, which means "apostle". The diminutive form Tolis (Τόλης) is also common. Bearers of the name include:

- Apostolis Anthimos (born 1954), Polish jazz / rock oriented guitarist, drummer and keyboard player
- Apostolos Apostolopoulos (Canadian actor known as Alex Carter) (born 1964), Canadian television and film actor
- Apostolos Athanassakis, Greek classical scholar
- Apostolos Christou (born 1996), Greek swimmer
- Apostolos Doxiadis (born 1953), Greek writer
- Apostolos Gerasoulis (born 1952), American-Greek computer scientist
- Apostolos Giannou (born 1990), Greek-Australian footballer
- Apostolos Gkountoulas (born 1985), Greek rower
- Apostolos Grozos (1892–1981), Greek politician
- Apostolos Kaklamanis (born 1936), Greek politician
- Apostolos Kathiniotis, Greek triple jumper
- Apostolos Kontos (born 1947), Greek basketball player and coach
- Apostolos Liolidis (born 1977), Greek footballer
- Apostolos Nanos (born 1966), Greek archer
- Apostolos Nikolaidis (athlete) (1896–1980), Greek footballer
- Apostolos Nikolaidis (singer) (1938–1999), Greek singer
- Apostolos Papandreou (born 1975), Greek canoeist
- Apostolos Paraskevas (born 1964), Greek musician
- Apostolos Santas (1922–2011), Greek resistance fighter
- Apostolos Siskos (born 2005), Greek swimmer
- Apostolos Tsianakas (born 1979), Greek footballer
- Apostolos Vellios (born 1992), Greek footballer
- Metropolitan Apostolos of Kilkis
- Metropolitan Apostolos II of Rhodes

== Surname ==
- Nikolis Apostolis, naval commander of the Greek War of Independence

== Other ==
- Greek ship Apostolis, Greek warship
