= José María Lanz =

Mexican engineer

José María Lanz y Zaldívar (March 26, 1764 – 1839) was a Spanish-Mexican mathematician and engineer. Together with Agustín de Betancourt, he developed the classification of mechanisms begun by Jean Nicolas Pierre Hachette, and counts as one of the founders of industrial kinematics (machine construction).

His name is sometimes written as Philippe Louis Lanz.

== Biography ==
He was born in Campeche in the south-east of Mexico, then Viceroyalty of New Spain, and studied at Instituto Campechano, where he was later also a teacher. He continued to study naval engineering in Spain. In 1781 he joined the Spanish Royal Navy at Cádiz, working as a cartographer and lecturer in mathematics. In Yucatan he studied the use of henequen for making ropes and other naval utensils, and published a report on this in 1783, making him the first to write about the use of this plant. In 1789 he made a tour through Europe with Josef de Mendoza y Ríos, visiting France, England, Germany, Sweden, Poland and Russia. In Paris he met Gaspard Monge and Agustín de Betancourt. Lanz left the navy in 1792, stayed in Paris and married there.

When Betancourt in 1802 founded the Engineering School for Roads, Canals and Harbours (Escuela de Ingenieros de Caminos, Canales y Puertos), today a branch of the Technical University of Madrid, Lanz became a professor there, and remained so until 1805.

Soon after the establishment in 1794 of École Polytechnique in Paris, Monge had proposed a class on the analysis of mechanisms and described the subject to fellow teachers. When the class was first taught in 1806 by Hachette, Lanz and Betancourt were among its students. Lanz revised his lecture notes and published them together with Betancourt as Essai sur la composition des machines (1808; 2nd ed. 1819; 3rd ed. 1840), encouraged to do so by Monge and Hachette. This textbook on machine design became widespread in European universities. It was translated to English as Analytical essay of the construction of machines (1820, published by Rudolph Ackermann) and by Thomas Fenwick as Essays on practical mechanics (1822) and to German by Wilhelm Kreyher as Versuch über die Zusammensetzung der Maschinen (1829).

In the years 1805–1808, he led a Commission for science and art and 1808–1812 he worked for the ministry of the interior. In 1812 he went in exile to South America, and in 1816 became director for a school of mathematics in Buenos Aires. From 1817 he worked in Paris as a translator and private instructor. Between 1822 and 1826, he worked for the military of the recently independent republic of Gran Colombia as a cartographer, founder of schools, founder of a museum, and director of the Observatorio Astronómico Nacional de Colombia. Back in Paris, he lectured at a school of geography and collaborated with watchmaker Breguet. He died in 1839 in Paris.
