= ROAC =

ROAC may refer to:

- rape of a child, see statutory rape
- Reformed Old Apostolic Church
- Rock of Ages Corporation
- Roosevelt Academy (website roac.nl prior to becoming University College Roosevelt and moving to ucr.nl)
- Russian Orthodox Autonomous Church
- Royal Army Ordnance Corps
- Roäc, a raven character in The Hobbit
