= Apostol =

Apostol may refer to:

== People ==
Apostol is an East European name and name element derived from Ancient Greek ἀπόστολος "apostle", and therefore found mainly in Christian societies and cultures.

== Given name ==
- Apostol Mărgărit (1832–1903), a Romanian school teacher and writer
- Apostol Meksi (born in 1825–date of death unknown) an Albanian doctor, folklorist and patriot
- Apostol Muzac (born 1987), a Romanian football player
- Apostol Petkov (1869–1911), a Bulgarian revolutionary
- Apostol Tnokovski (born 1982), a Macedonian product designer

== Surname ==
- Constantin Apostol (1903–1996), a Romanian equestrian
- Dan Apostol (1957–2013), Romanian writer and researcher
- Danylo Apostol (1654–1734), the Hetman of the Left-bank Ukraine
- Eugenia Duran Apostol (born 1925), a Filipino journalist
- Gheorghe Apostol (1913–2010), a Romanian politician
- Gina Apostol (born 1963), Philippines-born American writer
- Ioan Apostol (born 1959), a Romanian luger
- Iulian Apostol (born 1980), a Romanian professional football player
- Jadwiga Apostoł (1913–1990), Polish resistance leader
- Justin Apostol (1921–1991), a Romanian footballer
- Nicolas Apostol (born 1999), a Canadian professional soccer player
- Ștefan Apostol (born 1974), a Romanian professional football player
- Tom M. Apostol (1923–2016), an American analytic number theorist
- Tyson Apostol (born 1979), an American professional cyclist and four-time Survivor contestant.
- William Apostol (born 1992), an American guitarist and bluegrass musician

== Other ==
- Epistle, a book used in Eastern Orthodox worship
- a barangay in San Felipe, Zambales Province, Philippines

== See also ==
- Apostle (disambiguation)
- El Apóstol
- Apostolic (disambiguation)
- Muravyov-Apostol (disambiguation)
