= Robert Lombard =

Robert William Lombard (18 October 1895 – July 1972) was the first coloured Helper Apostle of the Old Apostolic Church of Africa and founder of the Non-White Old Apostolic Church, that was later renamed to the Reformed Old Apostolic Church.

He was ordained in the New Apostolic Church in 1920, but left that denomination with Carl George Klibbe, who went on to form the Old Apostolic Church; he was ordained into the OAC on May 11, 1958.

In 1972 Lombard was excommunicated from the Old Apostolic Church; he then established the Non-White Old Apostolic Church. The church had to change its name three years later due to a court case.
