= Catholic Apostolic Church (disambiguation) =

Catholic Apostolic Church or Apostolic Catholic Church may refer to:

- Apostolic Catholic Church (Philippines), an Independent Catholic denomination established in 1992
- Catholic Apostolic Church, the movement associated with Edward Irving
  - Our Saviour New York, a church of the Catholic Apostolic Church which is also called as such
- Catholicate of the West, also called Catholic Apostolic Church and Catholic Apostolic Church (Catholicate of the West)
- Argentine Catholic Apostolic Church, an organisation founded in 1971
- Brazilian Catholic Apostolic Church, an organisation founded in 1945
- Mexican Catholic Apostolic Church, an organisation founded in 1925
- Irish Orthodox Catholic and Apostolic Church, founded by the independent bishop Michael Cox
- Catholic Apostolic Church of Antioch, founded in 1958
- Catholic Apostolic Charismatic Church of Jesus the King
- Venezuelan Catholic Apostolic Church

== See also ==
- List of independent Catholic denominations
- Apostolic Catholic Church (Philippines)
- Apostolic Church (disambiguation)
- Catholic Church (disambiguation)
- Apostolic (disambiguation)
- Catholic (disambiguation)
