= Apostolic =

Apostolic may refer to:

== The Apostles ==
An Apostle meaning one sent on a mission:

- The Twelve Apostles of Jesus, or something related to them, such as the Church of the Holy Apostles
- Apostolic succession, the doctrine connecting the Christian Church to the original Twelve Apostles
- The Apostolic Fathers, the earliest generation of post-Biblical Christian writers
- The Apostolic Age, the period of Christian history when Jesus' apostles were living
- The Apostolic Constitutions, part of the Ante-Nicene Fathers collection

== Specific to the Roman Catholic Church ==
- Apostolic Administrator, appointed by the Pope to an apostolic administration or a diocese without a bishop
- Apostolic Camera, or "Apostolic Chamber", former department of finance for Papal administration
- Apostolic constitution, a public decree issued by the Pope
- Apostolic Palace, the residence of the Pope in Vatican City
- Apostolic prefect, the head of a mission of the Roman Catholic Church
- The Apostolic See, sometimes used to refer to the See of Rome; see Apostolic see § Specific reference to Rome
- Apostolic vicariate, a territorial jurisdiction of the Roman Catholic Church
- Chancery of Apostolic Briefs, a historical office charged with preparation of Papal correspondence

== National churches ==
- Church of Our Lord Jesus Christ of the Apostolic Faith, an apostolic organization based in the United States
- Apostolic Catholic Church (Philippines), a church based in the Philippines
- Armenian Apostolic Church, also known as the Armenian Orthodox Church, the national church of Armenia
- Apostolic Brethren, a 13th-century sect in northern Italy
- The Apostolic Church Nigeria, a Lagos-based Pentecostal Christian denomination in Nigeria, affiliated with the Apostolic Church
- Assyrian Church of the East, ancient Christian religious body from Assyria

== Christian denominations ==
- Apostolic Christian Church, an anabaptist branch of Christianity
- Laestadianism, or Apostolic Lutheranism, a pietistic Lutheran movement
- Apostolic Pastoral Congress, an organization consisting of Pentecostal bishops, pastors and other clergy, functioning as a collegiate collective, and founded during the first decade of the 21st century
- Catholic Apostolic Church, a millenarian religious community, related to the Irvingism movement
- Celtic Orthodox Church, also known as the Catholic Apostolic Church (Catholicate of the West), a name adopted in the 1940s by a movement to restore ancient Christianity in Britain and the West
- Christ Apostolic Church, an indigenous African church
- New Apostolic Church, a chiliastic (premillenarian) church
- Oneness Pentecostalism, also known as Apostolic Pentecostalism, a form of Pentecostal Christianity that is non-trinitarian in theology

== Concepts ==
- An apostolic see, any episcopal see whose foundation is attributed to one or more of the Apostles
- Apostolic poverty, a doctrine professed in the 13th century by certain religious orders
- Apostolic King, hereditary title of the King of Hungary

== See also ==
- Apostle (disambiguation)
- Apostolic Church (disambiguation)
- Catholic Apostolic Church (disambiguation)
- Apostol (disambiguation)
