= Apostolos =

Apostolos may refer to:

- The Apostolos (Eastern Orthodox liturgy), a book containing texts traditionally believed to be authored by one of the twelve apostles (disciples) – various epistles and the Acts of the Apostles – from which one is selected to be read during service
- Apostolos (given name)
- The Greek for apostle
