= John Florentine Teruel =

First Patriarch of Apostolic Catholic Church (1950–2021)

John Florentine
- First Patriarch of the Apostolic Catholic Church
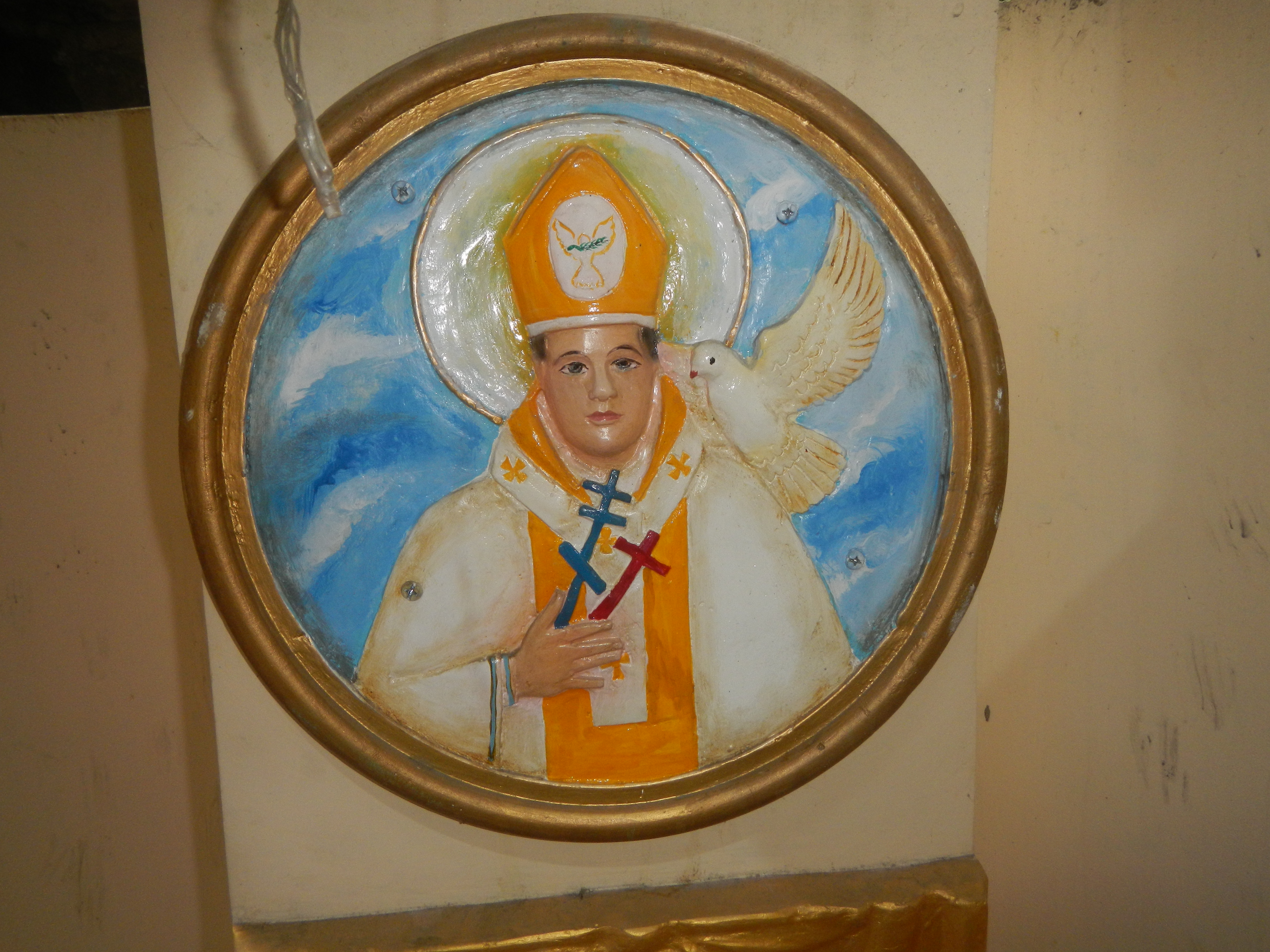
- Image sculpture of Teruel displayed at the National Shrine of Ina Poon Bato
- Church: Apostolic Catholic Church
- Installed: July 13, 1991
- Term ended: January 19, 2021
- Successor: Juan Almario Calampiano

Orders
- Consecration: July 13, 1991 (as Patriarch) by National Conference of Old Catholic and Orthodox Archbishops

Personal details
- Born: July 24, 1950 Malate, Manila
- Died: January 19, 2021 (aged 70)
- Denomination: Apostolic Catholic
- Parents: Maria Virginia Leonzon; Jose Benedicto Teruel
- Education: Philippine College of Health Sciences (PhD); Virgen Delos Remedios College (MAEd); Ateneo de Manila University; University of Santo Tomas

Sainthood
- Venerated in: Apostolic Catholic Church
- Canonized: August 1, 2021; National Shrine of Ina Poon Bato by Patriarch Juan Almario

John Florentine Leonzon Teruel (July 25, 1950 – January 19, 2021) was the first Patriarch and the founding bishop of the Apostolic Catholic Church (ACC). In 1991 the organization schismed with the Roman Catholic Church.

== Biography ==
=== Early life ===
John Florentine Teruel was born in Malate, Manila to Jose Benedicto Teruel and Maria Virginia P. Leonzon.

=== Education and early religious service ===
John Florentine received his Doctor of Philosophy Major in Educational Management in 2002 at the Philippine College of Health and Science.

John Florentine Teruel was a Seminarian at San Jose Major Seminary. He also entered the Blessed Sacrament Seminary (S.S.S. Fathers), Our Lady of Angeles Seminary (OFM Fathers) and San Jose Major Seminary.

=== Consecration as first Patriarch ===
Teruel was consecrated as Patriarch by the National Conference of Old Catholic and Orthodox Archbishops, on July 13, 1991, at St. Paul's German Old Catholic Church. After his consecration as Patriarch, he then ordained several men in the Philippines and America to become priests and deacons.

Teruel was appointed as chairman of the National Social Action Council (NASAC) in 2013, an advisory body under the Office of the President of the Philippines. He also supported the Rotary Club and the Unification Movement. He was also involved in the National Council of Churches in the Philippines, of which the ACC is a member.

Teruel has been credited for all of his initiations on ecumenical missions, during his time as a Patriarch, with various churches throughout the Philippines and North America that has achieved ecumenism with 35 churches.

Before his death on January 19, 2021, he had served as the church's Pontifical Presbyter for three decades. After his death, he was succeeded by his long time Chancellor, Senior Archbishop Juan Almario.

== Canonization ==
The Apostolic Catholic Church canonized John Florentine as a saint by his successor Patriarch Juan Almario on August 1, 2021 at the National Shrine of Ina Poon Bato in Quezon City.
