= Muravyov-Apostol =

Muravyov-Apostol may refer to:

- Ivan Muravyov-Apostol (1762–1851), a Russian statesman and writer, the son of Elena Apostol, a granddaughter of Danylo Apostol
- Matvey Muravyov-Apostol (1793–1886), a Russian Decembrist, lieutenant-colonel of the Tsarist Russian Army, the son of Ivan Muravyov-Apostol
- Sergey Muravyov-Apostol (1796–1826), a Russian Decembrist, lieutenant-colonel of the Tsarist Russian Army, the son of Ivan Muravyov-Apostol
- Ippolit Muravyov-Apostol (1806–1826), a Russian decembrist and warrant officer, the son of Ivan Muravyov-Apostol
