= Apostle of Mercy =

Apostle of Mercy may refer to:

- blessed Michał Sopoćko
- saint Faustina Kowalska
- Józef Andrasz
- Apostoł Miłosierdzia Bożego, a quarterly edited by the Pallottines
