= Juan Almario Calampiano =

Patriarch of the Apostolic Catholic Church

Patriarch Juan Almario
- Second Patriarch of the Apostolic Catholic Church
- Church: Apostolic Catholic Church
- Installed: January 31, 2021
- Predecessor: John Florentine Teruel
- Previous posts: Senior Archbishop and Chancellor to the Patriarch

Orders
- Consecration: January 31, 2021 (as Patriarch)

Personal details
- Born: Elvis Mitra Calampiano
- Denomination: Apostolic Catholic Church (Philippines)

Juan Almario (English: John Almary; Latin: Ioannes Almarius; born Elvis Mitra Calampiano) is the second and current patriarch of the Apostolic Catholic Church.

He was consecrated as patriarch through ceremonies held on 31 January 2021. Before his appointment as head of the church, he served as long-time senior archbishop and chancellor to the patriarch at the National Shrine of Ina Poon Bato in Quezon City, Philippines.
