= Old Apostolic Church =

Former part of the Catholic Apostolic Church

The Old Apostolic Church (OAC) is a church with roots in the Catholic Apostolic Church.

== History ==
The Old Apostolic Church's roots are found in the Catholic Apostolic Church that was established in 1832 as an outflow of the Albury Movement.

=== Expansion in South Africa ===
The evangelist Carl Georg Klibbe, a former Lutheran pastor, arrived in South Africa from Australia in 1889 to undertake missionary work associated with the New Apostolic Church. His initial efforts in Cape Town met with limited success, after which he relocated in 1892 to East London, where a German-speaking community had settled. There, a congregation was established, and a church building was later constructed in Southernwood.

Klibbe was ordained to the apostolic ministry by Apostle H. F. Niemeyer of Queensland, Australia, in a letter dated 8 July 1893.

In 1901, Georg Heinrich Wilhelm Schlapphof, a German immigrant, joined the congregation and was sealed in 1902. Later that year, he was ordained into ministry and sent to Cape Town to re-establish the church. On 4 June 1906, the first church building in Cape Town was dedicated. The congregation became informally known as the German Apostolic Church.

Missionary activity expanded to other cities including Port Elizabeth, Durban, and Johannesburg, with further outreach to surrounding towns such as Grahamstown, King William's Town, and Kimberley.

=== Schism and division ===
A disagreement arose within the South African church leadership between Carl Georg Klibbe and Georg Heinrich Wilhelm Schlapphof. Schlapphof had been appointed to the bishop ministry in 1910, but this appointment was later withdrawn and revised to that of district elder, contributing to tensions between the two leaders.

At the same time, differences developed between Apostle H. F. Niemeyer in Australia and Chief Apostle Hermann Niehaus in Germany, contributing to wider divisions within the apostolic movement.

In 1913, Schlapphof travelled to Germany, where he was ordained as an apostle by Chief Apostle Niehaus. Klibbe was subsequently excommunicated from the New Apostolic Church, although he did not accept this decision.

From 1913 onward, two groups operated in South Africa under the name "New Apostolic Church", one led by Klibbe and the other by Schlapphof.

The dispute was formally addressed in a legal settlement in 1926 in the Supreme Court of South Africa (Witwatersrand Local Division). The agreement recognised the independence of the church under Klibbe and provided that his organisation would no longer use the name "New Apostolic Church", but would instead operate under a distinct name, including "Old Apostolic Church of Africa".

The settlement further acknowledged Klibbe as Apostle of the Old Apostolic Church of Africa, while recognising Schlapphof as Apostle and leader in Africa for the New Apostolic Church under German leadership.

Sources suggest that the dispute may have included disagreements over financial administration, including the handling of tithes.

=== OAC after Apostle Klibbe ===
At the time of Klibbe's death on 22 May 1931, The Old Apostolic Church had more than 1 million adherents. Apostles Ernest Fredrick Willhelm Ninow, Carl Fredrick Willhelm Ninow and William Campbell were appointed by Klibbe as his successors before he died, with EFW Ninow as the Chairman and Leader of the church.

At present, the Old Apostolic Church is estimated to have around 2 million members in Africa. Congregations can be found in South Africa, Eswatini, Namibia, Zimbabwe, Mozambique, Botswana, Zambia, Malawi, USA, Canada, British Isles, Netherlands, Belgium, Australia, New Zealand and the United Arab Emirates. The Old Apostolic Church is independent from the New Apostolic Church and the United Apostolic Church.

=== Schisms from the OAC ===
The following groups broke away from The Old Apostolic Church:

- 1925 "Apostolic Church" under the leadership of Heinrich Velde, the son in law of Apostle Klibbe. This group became part of the Apostolic Church of South Africa - Apostle Unity and the United Apostolic Church.
- 1968 Twelve Apostles Church of Africa, due to doctrinal differences under the leadership of Helper-Apostle Jim Scotch Ndlovu after he was removed from office.
- 1972 Reformed Old Apostolic Church under the leadership of Helper-Apostle Robert Lombard, broke away due to the unwillingness of The Old Apostolic Church leadership to take part in political debate concerning racial segregation, and a leadership dispute with the Apostolate of the OAC concerning revelations received by Lombard. It was first established as the Non-White Old Apostolic Church but forced to change its name in a court case in 1975
- 1993 The Foundation of Apostles and Prophets Church, was founded by Vuyisilile Naborth Vika, a former Helper-Apostle of the OAC who was removed from office in 1990 for actively promoting politics within the church, in contravention to church policy.

== Views ==
=== Doctrine and practice ===
The Old Apostolic Church teaches that the Bible is the Word of God and serves as the primary basis for its doctrine.

The church affirms belief in one God, the Father, and in Jesus Christ as the Son of God, described as fully divine and fully human, as well as in the Holy Spirit.

A central feature of the church is the role of living apostles, who are regarded as having authority within the church for teaching, governance, and the administration of sacraments.

The Old Apostolic Church recognises three principal sacraments: baptism, Holy Communion, and sealing. Baptism is administered with water as a sign of repentance and entry into the Christian life. Holy Communion is understood as participation in the body and blood of Christ. Sealing is administered through the laying on of hands by an apostle and is associated with the reception of the Holy Spirit.

According to church directives, sealing also takes place in connection with the dead. The church's domestic rules state that "the sealing of the souls in the realm of the dead takes place immediately after the sealing of members", and provide guidelines for how such services are conducted.

The church teaches that the Kingdom of God is both a present spiritual reality and associated with the work of the apostles within the church.

=== Politics ===
Members of the Old Apostolic Church are not allowed to become registered members of any political parties, stand for election, or openly declare their political views. The OAC do not support any political parties. Members are however allowed to vote according to their conscience.

Officers are strictly forbidden to endorse any political party and may be removed from office if they do endorse any party.

Members must obey all laws of the countries in which they reside, even if the member is to suffer anguish.

The leadership of the Old Apostolic Church did make some submissions to the Truth and Reconciliation Commission (South Africa), and was the only Apostolic (Irvingist) Church to do so. This submission was not an admission of guilt, and the Church was not accused or found guilty of contravening any laws or international laws. The church policy stipulates that all assistance will be given to government as required by law.

== Bible ==
The Old Apostolic Church recognises and uses the Authorised King James Version. All Bibles used must be comparable to the Authorised King James Version. The Afrikaanse Ou Vertaling (Hersiene Uitgawe) is used in Afrikaans-speaking congregations. In Germany the 1912 Luther Bible is used.

The Old Apostolic Church Confession states: "We believe in the Holy Scriptures, the Old and the New Testament, and in the fulfillment of the promises contained therein".

=== Bibles in use ===
The following Bible translations are officially sanctioned by the Conference of Apostles for use in the church:

- Afrikaans: Bybel in Afrikaans (1933–1953)
- English: King James Version (1611)
- English: New King James Version (Thomas Nelson – 1983)
- Dutch: Staten Generaal (1618 and 1619)
- German: The Bible in German - Bible text translation by Martin Luther - (1912 and 1984 Revision)
- Portuguese: The Bible in Portuguese (A Biblia Sagrada; Contendo o Velho e o Novo Testamento) 1100 Lisbon, Portugal
- Sepedi: The Bible in Northern Sotho (1951 and 1986)
- Sesotho: The Bible in Southern Sotho (Biblele E Halalelang, 1961 and 1983)
- Setswana: The Bible in Tswana (Baebele E E Boitshepo, 1908–1992)
- Xitsonga: The Bible in Xitsonga (Bibele Yi NEA; Testamente Ya Khale Ni Le'yint_ha 1929–1987)
- Xhosa: The Bible in Xhosa (Incwadi Yezibhalo Ezingcwele, 1971)
- Zulu: The Bible in Zulu (First SA Edition, 1977)

All other Bible translations in other languages may be used, with the permission of the local Forum of Apostles if it compares with the Authorised King James Version.
