= María del Carmen Betancourt y Molina =

Spanish inventor

María del Carmen Betancourt y Molina (1758 in Los Realejos – 1824 in Puerto de la Cruz) was a Spanish inventor based in the Canary Islands, best remembered for her first design, an epicyclindrical machine for twining silk, developed alongside her brothers Agustín de Betancourt and Jose de Betancourt y Castro. The siblings presented her design of the epicylindrical machine to the Royal Economic Society of Friends of the Country of Tenerife, in 1778.

In addition, she made the first tape of woven velvet on the island. She also worked on a recipe for dyes, betting on the modernization of the silk industry, thanks to her excellent knowledge of silkworms. For all these reasons, she is considered a science pioneer in the Canary Islands.

== Biography ==
María del Carmen Betancourt y Molina was born the third of eleven siblings and she became a research enthusiast as a child. Her parents were Leonor de Molina y Briones, daughter of the Marquises of Villafuerte, and Agustín de Betancourt y Castro, mayorazgo of her house, knight of the Order of Calatrava and lieutenant colonel of the Royal Armies. The Tenerife Betancourt family can trace their surname to Jean de Béthencourt, who launched colonization of the Canary Islands in 1402, although he himself had no issue (the family name being carried onwards by Native Canarians that were batised with his). Her father was a founding member of the Royal Economic Society of Friends of the Country of Tenerife in La Laguna. In 1778, it was precisely in the newly created Society that she presented her first design, an epicylindrical machine for twining silk, made in collaboration with her brother, Agustín de Betancourt y Molina.

Despite being separated since the age of twenty, she maintained an ongoing epistolary relationship with her second brother, the prestigious Canarian engineer and inventor Agustín de Betancourt y Molina. They were both born in the same year, 1758, and also both died in the same year, 1824. Throughout her life she lived in the family home, directly involved in the problems generated by the silk manufacturing industry and the attempts to improve the quality and production of this practice.

In addition to being co-author of the epicylindrical machine, she also presented to the Sociedad Económica de la Laguna, in 1779, the document entitled Economic method for fine crimson dyes, which includes two recipes for silk dyes together with some samples of fabric dyed following recipe directions.

She died unmarried in Puerto de la Cruz.

=== Questionable research ===
In practically all the relevant studies on the silk manufacturing industry on the island of Tenerife, María has been considered a Poor Clare Nun from La Orotava, but later evidence has been presented of the error of such an affirmation. Very probably her report on how to obtain the crimson color constitutes the first scientific report signed by a woman in the Canary Islands.

== Legacy ==
In March 2018, the Government of the Canary Islands announced the creation of a line of subsidies that bears her name. The María del Carmen Betancourt y Molina research support program aims to encourage female leadership in this area.
