= Józef Andrasz =

Polish Roman Catholic priest (1891 – 1963

Józef Andrasz, SJ (16 October 1891 – 1 February 1963) was a Polish Catholic priest, writer, translator and editor. A member of the Society of Jesus, he was a confessor of Faustina Kowalska. On November 12, 2024, Archbishop Marek Jędraszewski of Krakow announced the initiation of Andrasz' beatification process, granting him the title of Servant of God.

== Career ==
Andrasz worked in the Apostleship of Prayer publishing house in Poland (Wydawnictwo Apostolstwa Modlitwy). He was responsible for the publication of 41 volumes in the series The Library of the Internal Life (Biblioteka Życia Wewnętrznego). They were mostly translations of great works on asceticism that he had worked on himself. He was also the editor-in-chief of the popular Catholic paper "The Messenger of the Heart of Jesus" (Posłaniec Serca Jezusowego). He was also national manager of the Apostleship of Prayer and of Catholic Action for Family Consecration -(Dzieło Poświęcenia Rodzin).

While Faustina Kowalska stayed with her order in Kraków, he became her confessor. She mentioned Andrasz many times in her Diary in terms such as follow:

"It is a strange thing that, until I met Father Andrasz, confessors could neither understand me nor set my mind at rest concerning these matters [the revelations]" (p.111), and
"I am very grateful to the Lord for having given me an enlightened priest" (p. 1596).

== Initiation of Divine Mercy ==
In 1943 Andrasz initiated public devotion to the Divine Mercy in the Divine Mercy Sanctuary in Kraków. The same year, under his direction, a popular version of the Image of Divine Mercy since exhibited in the sanctuary, was painted by Adolf Hyła.

== See also ==
- Michał Sopoćko
