= Greek ship Apostolis =

At least two ships of the Hellenic Navy have borne the name Apostolis (Greek: Αποστόλης) after Greek naval hero Nikolis Apostolis:

- Greek corvette Apostolis, a Flower-class corvette launched in 1940 as HMS Hyacinth and transferred to Greece and renamed in 1943. She was scrapped in 1952.
- Greek destroyer Apostolis (D216), a Gearing-class destroyer launched in 1945 as USS Charles P. Cecil she was transferred to Greece in 1980 and renamed. She was scrapped in 2003.
