= Heinrich Friedrich Niemeyer =

German clergyman

- Born: 11 December 1853; Schladen, Lower Saxony
- Died: 29 February 1920 (aged 66); Hatton Vale, Queensland, Australia
- Occupation: clergyman
- Known for: founder, Apostolic Church of Queensland in Australia
- Children: 3 daughters

Heinrich Friedrich Niemeyer (1853–1920) was a German clergyman. He founded the Apostolic Church of Queensland in Australia in 1883.

== Early life ==
Niemeyer was born on 11 December 1853 in Schladen in the Harz Mountains in Lower Saxony.

Services for the General Christian Apostolic Mission took place in his mother's house. He became a priest in this faith and was appointed as an evangelist, but supported his family through working on the railways.

== Life in Queensland ==
In 1883 at the age of 30, Niemeyer emigrated to Queensland with his wife and three daughters on the ship Almora arriving in Brisbane on 23 June 1883. Despite having no agricultural experience, he purchased land at Grandchester and commenced creating a farm from virgin bushland. On 7 August 1885 he was naturalised as a British subject. He is not known to have evanglised during this period, most likely due to the demands of his farm.

In 1884 Niemeyer was bitten by a death adder (one of the most venomous snakes in the world) and, despite applying a tourniquet, his arm swelled with terrible pain and he believed he was dying. His wife reminded him that the Apostle Paul had survived the bite of a deadly snake. Niemeyer prayed and regarded his subsequent survival as both a miracle but also a sign from God that he had neglected his calling as an evangelist. He began to do missionary work for the apostolic faith and within two years had gathered a congregation, which consisted mainly of German immigrants who were formerly Lutheran. He purchased another farm at Hatton Vale.

Niemeyer was a skilled orator. Being a farmer, he easily formed a common bond with other local farmers, particularly as he acquired a reputation of being able to successfully pray for rain. There were also schisms within the Lutheran Church in Australia at that time, causing many Queensland Lutheran to question their commitment to the Lutheran faith. He is thought to have acquired 2,000 followers in this period. Impressed by his achievements, the General Christian Apostolic Mission invited him to return to Germany (at his own expense) to be ordained as an Apostle within the church, which would enable him to "seal" converts in Australia, an important part of the Apostolic ritual. He was ordained an Apostle in a ceremony at Osterode am Harz on 25 July 1886.

In 1889 a church was built on Niemeyer's farm at Hatton Vale. He actively encouraged his congregations to retain both their German culture and language by celebrating many religious festivals with traditional German hospitality and built halls in conjunction with the church buildings for this purpose. Members of the congregation were encouraged to use these halls for family celebrations such as weddings and birthday, which helped make the church cohesive culturally, socially and spiritually. By 1899 there were nine congregations of the Apostolic Church in Queensland, from Norwell to the south through to Bundaberg to the north, all in districts with a large German immigrant population.

One difficulty that Niemeyer experienced was the Queensland Government's unwillingness to officially recognise the Apostolic Church as a religious denomination and Niemeyer as a clergyman. Niemeyer persisted with petitions and lobbying through prominent German citizens in Queensland, such as the German Consul Eugen Hirschfeld. A visit to the Hatton Vale church by the Queensland Governor Lord Lamington and his wife on Easter Monday 3 April 1899 was a significant moment in the recognition of the Apostolic Church in Queensland, at which the Governor was formally presented with a petition requesting official recognition of their denomination, which was granted on 27 April 1899.

In 1906 Niemeyer visited Germany again where he encouraged members of the General Christian Apostolic Mission to immigrate to Queensland. In response to interest shown in the idea, in 1908 Niemeyer commenced an immigration scheme with the support of the Queensland Premier which resulted in around 600 new Apostolic immigrants being settled in developing districts in Queensland in the years 1908 to 1912, further spreading the Apostolic Church in Queensland. In 1908 Niemeyer's work in maintaining German culture in Queensland was officially recognised with the award of the Kaiser's Order of the Crown.

Niemeyer's success in Queensland created friction with the other Apostles of the General Christian Apostolic Mission in Germany, particularly with Apostle Niehaus, which led to the German church censuring Niemeyer over various allegations. By this time Niemeyer was the longest-serving apostle within the Church and did not accept these criticisms, leading to the Queensland church separating from the German church with the Queensland congregation generally remaining loyal to Niemeyer.

In World War I against Germany, anti-German sentiment led to policies to arrest and intern many German-born or German-descended men of military age as enemy aliens. Naturalisation as British subjects did not protect German-born men, and from February 1916 Australian Government legislation classified the Australian-born German descendents as "aliens" if they had fathers or grandfathers born in Germany. The process of internment was selectively widened to embrace Lutheran pastors and other influential leaders of the German community. Therefore, despite being naturalised and being older (62) than military age, Niemeyer's influential role in the Apostolic Church and his strong commitment to maintaining German culture and language resulted in his internment in the Holsworthy Internment Camp. His son Willy who was born in Queensland was also interned there. There were appeals for the release of Niemeyer and his son, but these were unsuccessful. However, after Niemeyer was beat up in the camp, his health declined. In early 1918, with the support of the Queensland Premier T.J. Ryan, Niemeyer was transferred from the camp to low-security detention in a house in Dubbo where his wife was permitted to join him. He described himself in December 1918 as "your old and broken Apostle". He was finally released in October 1919.

== Later life ==
Niemeyer never fully recovered from his internment. On 29 February 1920, Niemeyer died of mitral stenosis (a heart disease) at Hatton Vale aged 66 years 2 months.

== Legacy ==
In 1950 the church on Niemeyer's Hatton Vale property was replaced with an Apostolic Cathedral designed by Karl Langer. It contains a marble memorial to Niemeyer.

As at May 2021, the Apostolic Church of Queensland continues to operate.
