= Twelve Apostles (disambiguation) =

The Twelve Apostles may refer to:

== Christianity ==
- Twelve Apostles, the twelve chosen followers of Jesus
- Quorum of the Twelve Apostles (LDS Church), a leadership organization in The Church of Jesus Christ of Latter-day Saints
- Council of Twelve Apostles (Community of Christ) a leadership organization in the Community of Christ
- Quorum of the Twelve, a leadership organization in some denominations within the Latter Day Saint movement
- Twelve Apostles of Ireland, twelve Irish saints of the early Celtic Church
- Twelve Apostles of Mexico, missionaries to New Spain

== Stones ==
- The Twelve Apostles (Victoria), a coastal limestone formation in Australia
- Twelve Apostles Stone Circle, stone circle in Dumfries and Galloway, Scotland
- Twelve Apostles, West Yorkshire, stone circle in West Yorkshire, England

== Other ==
- Twelve Apostles (IRA unit) or "The Squad", an Irish Republican Army unit founded by Michael Collins
- Twelve Apostles (Venezuela), a group of businessmen close to President Carlos Andrés Pérez in the 1970s
- "Green Grow the Rushes, O", a song sometimes called "The Twelve Apostles"
- Dvenadsat Apostolov, a Russian pre-dreadnought battleship in commission from 1892 to 1911.
- Twelve galleons built by Spain after the Armada of 1588, considered the pride of the fleet.
- Ajax Amsterdam's team of the early 1970s, see History of AFC Ajax
- The twelve apostles of Mani in Manichaeism
- Apostle (disambiguation)
