= Apostol Tnokovski =

Macedonian product designer (born 1982)

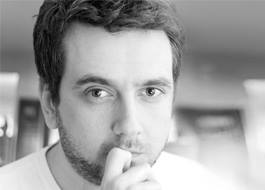
- Born: July 15, 1982 (age 43); Skopje, Macedonia, SFR Yugoslavia
- Education: European University-Republic of Macedonia
- Occupation: Product Designer
- Years active: 2004–present

Apostol Tnokovski is a Macedonian product designer. He often uses organic forms and the main inspiration for his work comes from the sea world. In 2010 he became widely known with his Hydra piano concept, inspired by Lady Gaga.

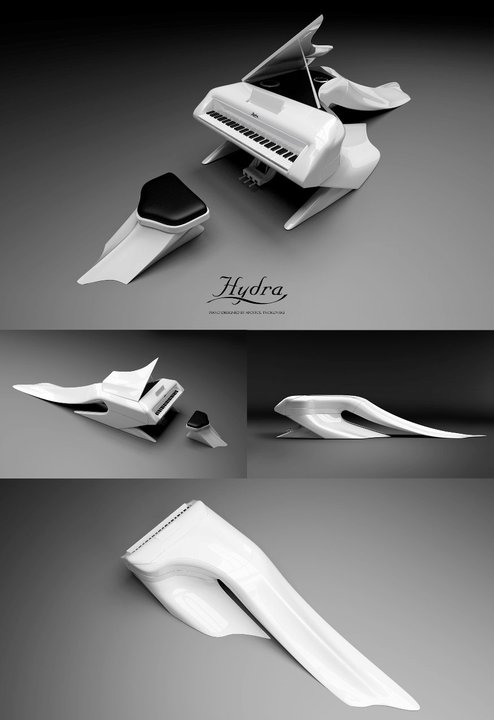
Hydra Piano

His work includes furniture design, shoes, concept cars, consumer products, watches and pianos.
