= Apostolos of Kilkis =

Greek bishop

Metropolitan Apostolos (Papakonstantinou) (1924 – 28 September 2009) was the metropolitan bishop of Kilkis from 1991 until his death. He was ordained a deacon in 1950 and a priest in 1954. He was elected and ordained as Bishop of Zakynthos in 1967.
