= Apostle =

Title given to a messenger or receiver of knowledge, especially in Christianity

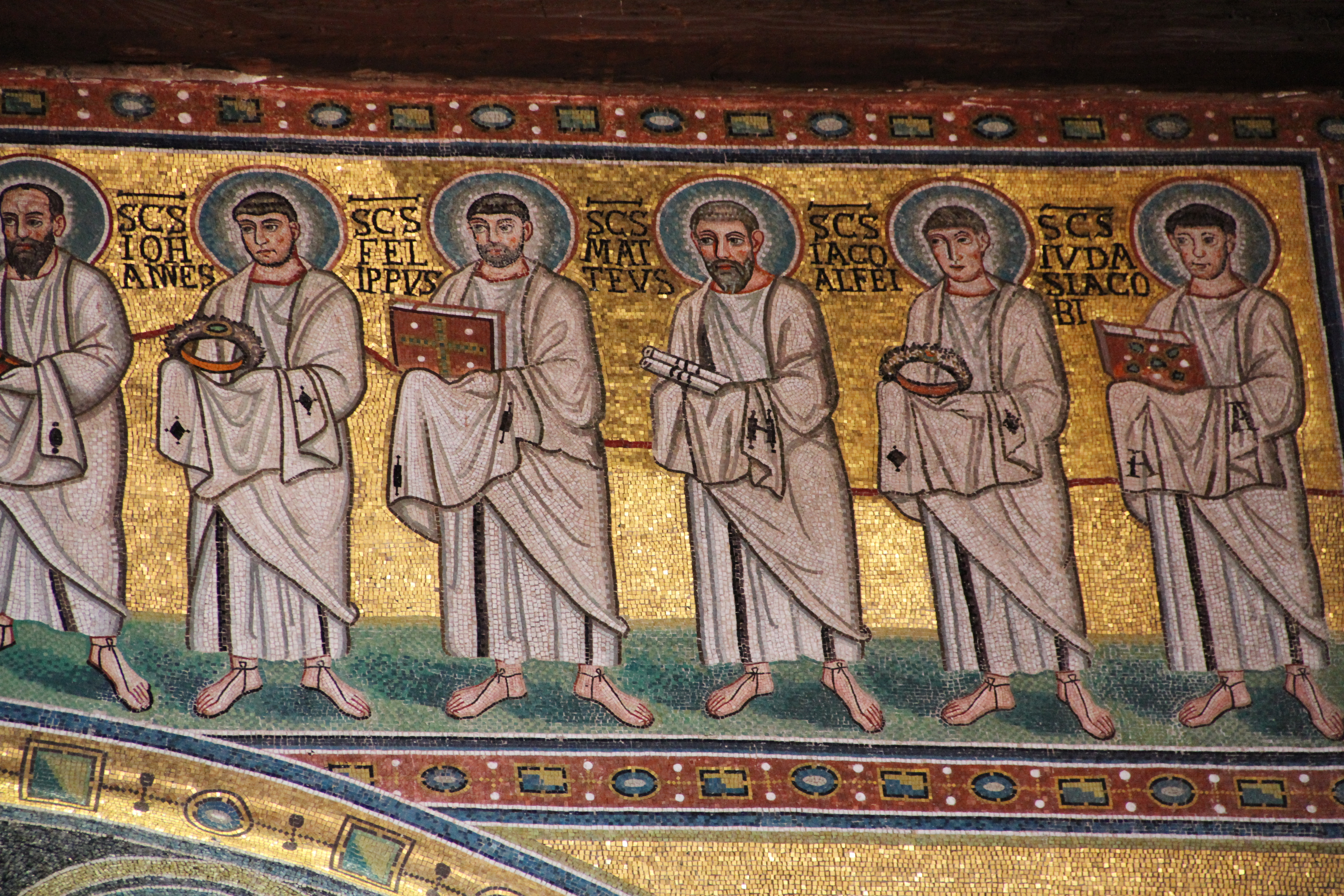
Some of the Twelve Apostles. Mosaic in the Euphrasian Basilica.

An apostle (/əˈpɒsəl/), in its literal sense, is an emissary. The word is derived from Ancient Greek ἀπόστολος (apóstolos), literally "one who is sent off", itself derived from the verb ἀποστέλλειν (apostéllein), "to send off". The purpose of such sending off is usually to convey a message, and thus "messenger" is a common alternative translation; other common translations include "ambassador" and "envoy". The term in Ancient Greek also has other related meanings.

In Christianity, the term was used in the New Testament for Jesus' Twelve Apostles (including Peter, James, and John), as well as a wider group of early Christian figures, including Paul, Barnabas, and Junia. The term is also used to designate an important missionary of Christianity to a region or a group, e.g. Patrick, the apostle of Ireland, or Boniface, the "apostle of the Germans". Some other religions use the term for comparable figures in their history. The word in this sense may be used metaphorically in various contexts, but is mostly found used specifically for early associates of the founder of a religion, who were important in spreading their teachings. The term has also been used to refer to someone who is a strong supporter of something.

== Terminology ==
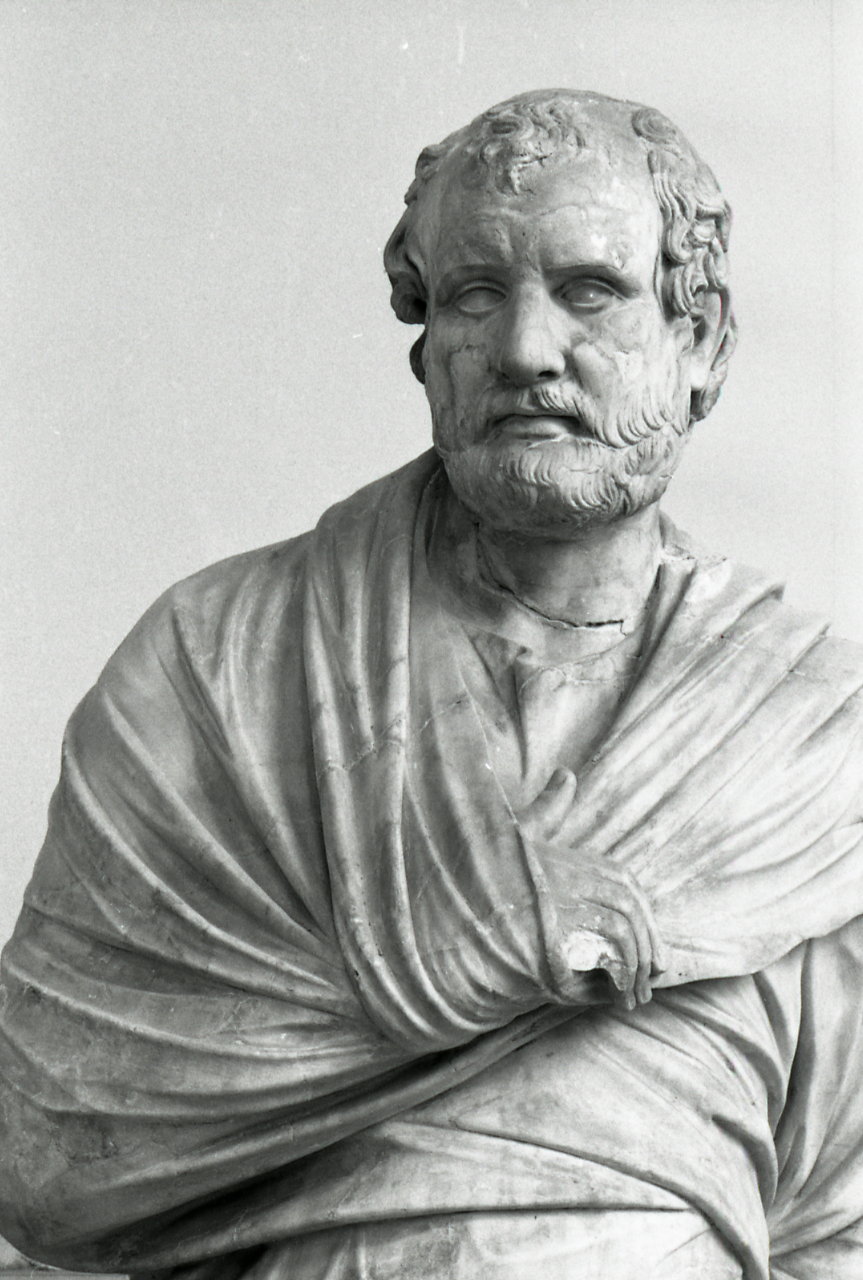
Aeschines (389–314 BC), who throughout his life was sent as member of some embassy missions

The term apostle is derived from Classical Greek ἀπόστολος (apóstolos), meaning "one who is sent off", from στέλλειν ("stellein"), "to send" + από (apó), "off, away from". The literal meaning in English is therefore an "emissary" (from the Latin mittere, "to send", and ex, "from, out, off").

The word apostle has two meanings: the broader meaning of a messenger and the narrower meaning of an early Christian apostle directly linked to Jesus. The more general meaning of the word is translated into Latin as missiō, and from this word we get missionary.

The term only occurs once in the Septuagint. But Walter Bauer in his Greek-English Lexicon relates the term to the rabbinical idea of a Shaliah, or agent: "Judaism had an office known as apostle (שליח)". The Friberg Greek Lexicon gives a broad definition as one who is sent on a mission, a commissioned representative of a congregation, a messenger for God, a person who has the special task of founding and establishing churches. The UBS Greek Dictionary also describes an apostle broadly as a messenger. The Louw-Nida Lexicon gives a very narrow definition of a special messenger, generally restricted to the immediate followers of Jesus, or extended to some others like Paul or other early Christians active in proclaiming the gospel.

The adjective apostolic (/ˌæpəˈstɒlɪk/) is claimed as a continuing characteristic by a number of prominent Christian churches (i.e., that a given church's traditions, practices, and teachings descend directly from the original apostles), and so finds wider modern application. The word is found, for example, in the "Apostolic See", the official name for the Roman Catholic Papacy; in the doctrine of apostolic succession, held by many branches of Christianity; and in the Four Marks of the Church ("one, holy, catholic, and apostolic") found in the Nicene-Constantinopolitan Creed.

== Judaism ==
"Apostoloi" was the official name given to the men sent by the rulers of Jerusalem to collect the half-shekel tax for the Temple, the tax itself being called "apostolé".

== Christianity ==
=== New Testament and early Christianity ===
Before their sending away, the Twelve had been called disciples, or "students" (Latin discipulus; Greek μαθητής mathētḗs; Hebrew לִמּוּד limmûdh; all meaning "one who learns"). Jesus is stated in the Bible to have sent out the Twelve Apostles, "whom he also named apostles" (Luke 6:13), first before his death "to the lost sheep of Israel" (Matthew 10), and after his resurrection, to spread the message of the Gospel to all nations (Matthew 28:16–28:20). There is also a tradition in the Eastern Churches of "Seventy Apostles", derived from the seventy-two disciples mentioned in the Gospel of Luke.

The title apostle from the New Testament was also given to others in the reference to the Apostles in the New Testament. For example, Saint Patrick (373–463 AD) was the "Apostle of Ireland" who also shares that title with the Twelve Apostles of Ireland; Saint Martin of Braga (520–580 AD) who was the "Apostle to the Suevi"; Saint Boniface (680–755) who was the "Apostle to the Germans"; Saint Francis Xavier (1506-1552) who was the "Apostle of the East Indies"; Saint José de Anchieta (1534–1597) who was the "Apostle of Brazil"; and Saint Peter of Betancur (1626–1667) who was the "Apostle of Guatemala".

=== Charismatic-Pentecostal movements ===
In modern usage, missionaries under Pentecostal movements often refer to themselves as apostles, a practice which stems from the Latin equivalent of apostle, i.e. missio, the source of the English word missionary. A modern-day apostle in the tradition of the Apostolic-Prophetic movement is one who is "called and sent by Christ to have the spiritual authority, character, gifts and abilities to successfully reach and establish people in Kingdom truth and order, especially through founding and overseeing local churches”, according to Dr. David Cannistraci. An "apostle" is one who has a call to plant and oversee churches, has verifiable church plants and spiritual sons in the ministry, who is recognized by other apostles and meets the biblical qualifications of an elder.

=== Latter Day Saint movement ===
The Church of Jesus Christ of Latter-Day Saints has always had, among its leadership, at least twelve individuals identified as apostles. Their primary role is to teach and testify of Jesus throughout the world.

In the Church of Jesus Christ of Latter-day Saints (Latter Day Saint movement), an apostle is a "special witness of the name of Jesus Christ who is sent to teach the principles of salvation to the world." In the Church of Jesus Christ of Latter- Day Saint churches, an apostle is a priesthood office of high authority within the church hierarchy.

In the Latter Day Saint churches, apostles are members of the Quorum of the Twelve Apostles of the church. Modern-day apostles are considered to have the same status and authority as the biblical apostles. Apostles and prophets are the foundation of the church, with Jesus as the chief cornerstone. The Articles of Faith, written by Joseph Smith, mentions apostles: "We believe in the same organization that existed in the Primitive Church, namely, apostles, prophets, pastors, teachers, evangelists, and so forth."

=== Irvingism ===
The Catholic Apostolic Church was led by twelve "apostles" until the last one died in 1901. Some of the denominations that descend from the Catholic Apostolic Church, such as the New Apostolic Church, are led by apostles. The Chief Apostle is the highest ranking minister in the New Apostolic Church.

== Islam ==
In Islam, an apostle or a messenger (Arabic: رسول, romanized: rasūl) is a prophet who is sent by God. According to the Qur'an, God has sent many prophets to mankind. The five universally acknowledged messengers in Islam are Ibrahim, Mūsa, Dāwūd, Īsā and Muhammad, as each is believed to have been sent with a scripture. (Note: Muslims believe Ibrahim received the Scrolls of Abraham, Musa received the Torah, Dāwūd received the Psalms, Jesus the Gospel in Islam and Muhammad received the Qur'an) Muslim tradition also maintains that Adam received scrolls as did some of the other patriarchs of the Generations of Adam. The term apostle or messenger is also applied to prophets sent to preach to specific areas; the Qur'an mentions Yunus, Elijah, Ismail, Shuaib and other prophets as being messengers as well.

Sahabah refers to the companions, disciples, scribes and family of the Islamic prophet Muhammad. Later scholars accepted their testimony of the words and deeds of Muhammad, the occasions on which the Qur'an was revealed and various important matters of Islamic history and practice.

== Baháʼí Faith ==
The Apostles of Bahá'u'lláh were nineteen eminent early followers of Bahá'u'lláh, the founder of the Baháʼí Faith. The apostles were designated as such by Shoghi Effendi, the head of the religion in the first half of the 20th century, and the list was included in The Baháʼí World, Vol. III (pp. 80–81).

These individuals played a vital role in the development of Bahá'u'lláh's Faith, consolidating its adherents and bringing its teachings around the world. To Baháʼís, they filled a similar role as the sons of Jacob, the apostles of Jesus, Muhammad's companions, or the Báb's Letters of the Living.

== See also ==
- Apostol (disambiguation), first and family name
- Apostolic (disambiguation)
- Equal-to-apostles
- Letters of the Living, the first eighteen disciples of the Bábí religion.
- Seventy disciples, also known as the "Seventy Apostles" by the Orthodox Church
- Shaliah
- Twelve Apostles (disambiguation)
