= Apostolic Church of Queensland =

Australian Christian denomination

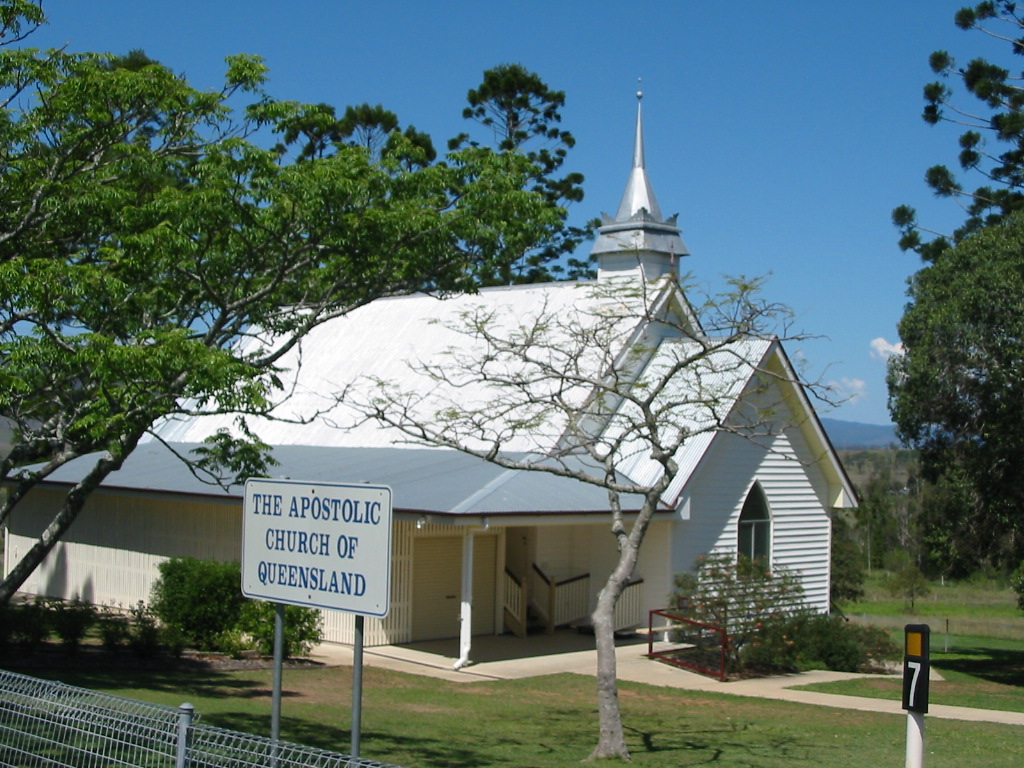
Apostolic Church, Mount Beppo, 2005

The Apostolic Church of Queensland is a Christian denomination in Queensland, Australia. It was founded by Heinrich Friedrich Niemeyer. It operates in two districts with separate administration, Southern District and Northern District.

== History ==
Heinrich Friedrich Niemeyer was ordained as an evangelist of the General Christian Apostolic Mission in Germany. Poor economic conditions in Germany resulted in Niemeyer and his wife and children immigrating to Queensland, Australia in 1883 where he established a farm in Grandchester. In 1884, Niemeyer was bitten by a death adder (one of the most venomous snakes in the world) and, despite applying a tourniquet, his arm swelled with terrible pain and he believed he was dying. His wife reminded him that the Apostle Paul had survived the bite of a deadly snake. Niemeyer prayed and regarded his subsequent survival as both a miracle but also a sign from God that he had neglected his calling as an evangelist. He began to do missionary work for the apostolic faith and within two years had gathered a congregation, which consisted mainly of German immigrants who were formerly Lutheran. He purchased another farm at Hatton Vale.

Niemeyer was a skilled orator. Being a farmer, he easily formed a common bond with other local farmers, particularly as he acquired a reputation of being able to successfully pray for rain. There were also schisms within the Lutheran Church in Australia at that time, causing many Queensland Lutherans to question their commitment to the Lutheran faith. He is thought to have acquired 2,000 followers in this period. Impressed by his achievements, the General Christian Apostolic Mission invited him to return to Germany (at his own expense) to be ordained as an Apostle within the church, which would enable him to "seal" converts in Australia, an important part of the Apostolic ritual. He was ordained an Apostle in a ceremony at Osterode am Harz on 25 July 1886.

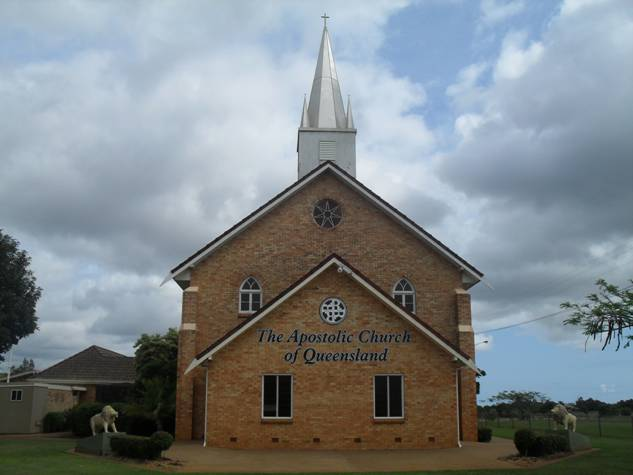
Bundaberg Cathedral, 2011

In 1889 a church was built on Niemeyer's farm at Hatton Vale. He actively encouraged his congregations to retain both their German culture and language by celebrating many religious festivals with traditional German hospitality and built halls in conjunction with the church buildings for this purpose. Members of the congregation were encouraged to use these halls for family celebrations such as weddings and birthday, which helped make the church cohesive culturally, socially and spiritually. By 1899 there were nine congregations of the Apostolic Church in Queensland, from Norwell to the south through to Bundaberg to the north, all in districts with a large German immigrant population.

A visit to the Hatton Vale church by the Queensland Governor Lord Lamington and his wife on Easter Monday 3 April 1899 was a significant moment in the recognition of the Apostolic Church in Queensland, at which the Governor was formally presented with a petition requesting official recognition of their denomination, which was granted on 27 April 1899. In 1908, Niemeyer commenced an immigration scheme with the support of the Queensland Premier which resulted in around 600 new Apostolic immigrants from Germany being settled in developing districts in Queensland in the years 1908 to 1912, further spreading the Apostolic Church in Queensland. In 1908, Niemeyer's work in maintaining German culture in Queensland was officially recognised with the award of the Kaiser's Order of the Crown.

The connection with the German church ended in 1912. In 1930, the name Apostolic Church of Queensland (ACQ) was adopted. In 1961, the church was divided into two circuits in response to the ordination of joint apostles of equal authority. These circuits became two districts in 1990 with the installation of two independent apostles of equal authority.

The southern district has its cathedral in Hatton Vale, while the northern district has its cathedral in Bundaberg.

== Church logo ==
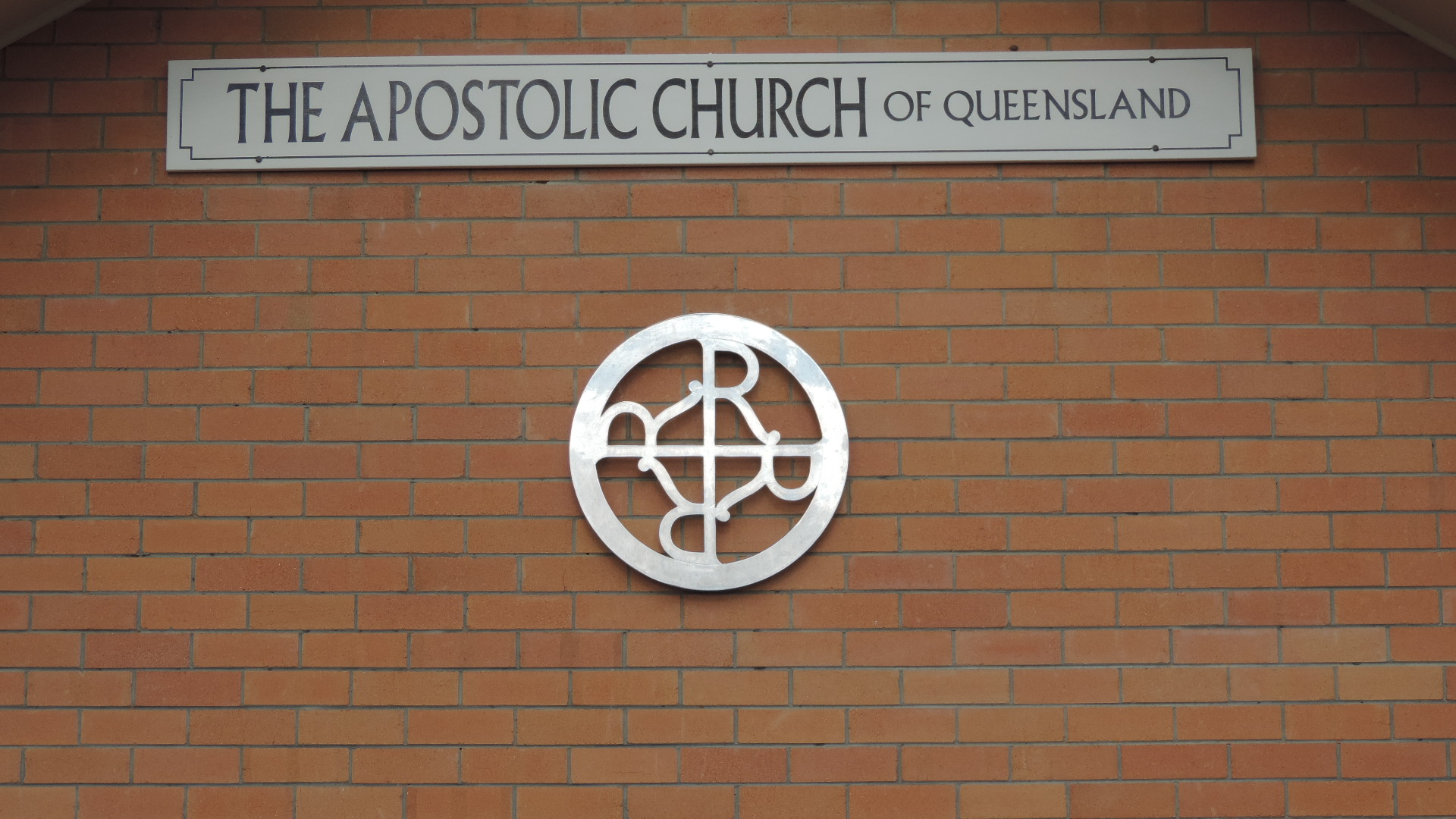
Logo of the Apostolic Church of Queensland

The church's logo is a 4R-symbol. The four "R"s stand for:

- Right
- Royal
- Righteous
- Rich

which are interpreted as:

- RIGHT according to the bible
- ROYAL as the Bride to have membership with Christ the King
- RIGHTEOUS in partaking of the body and blood of Christ
- RICH in the promises Christ gave to his apostles
