= Ann Fenwick =

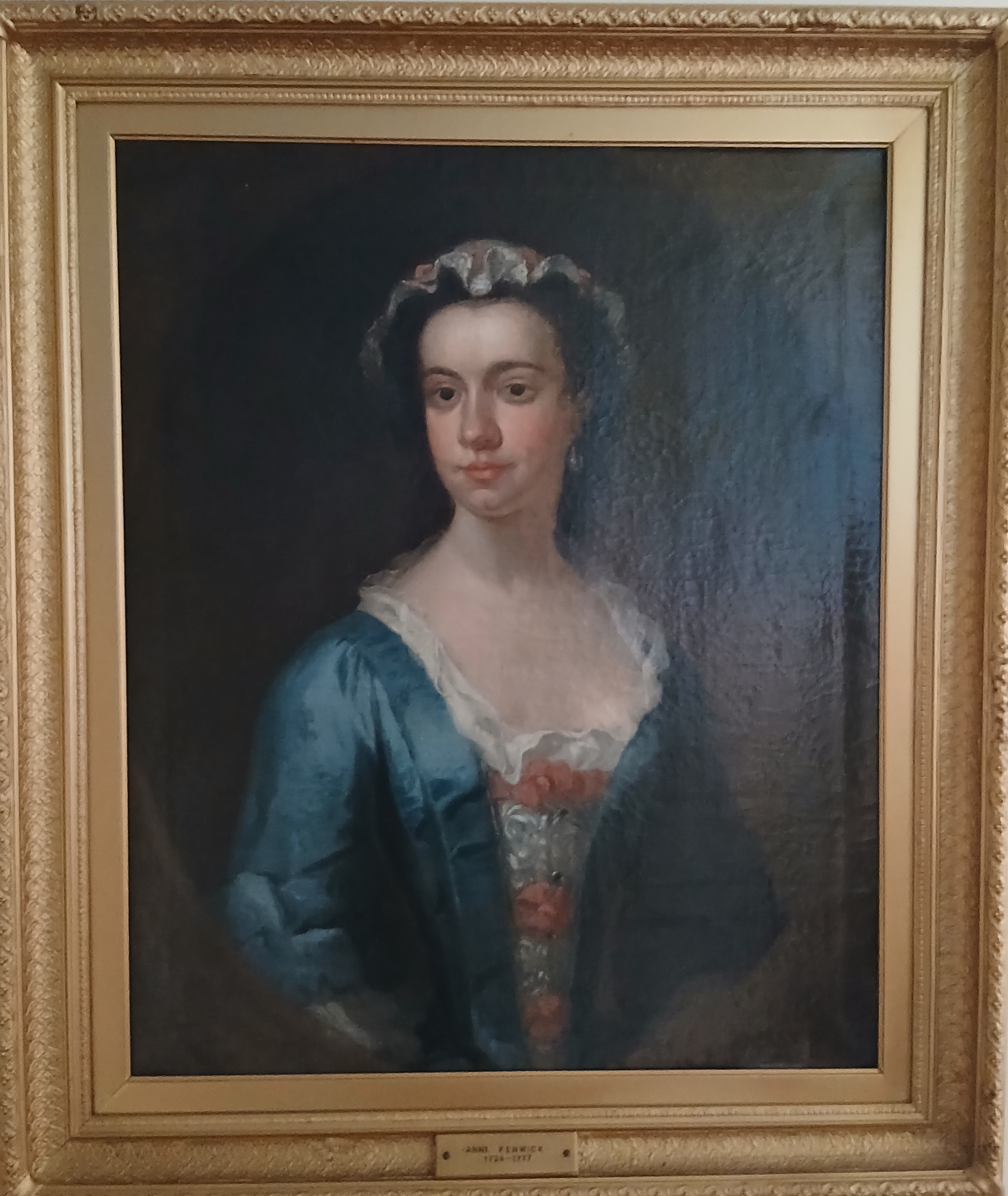
- Born: Ann Benison; 1724; Hornby
- Died: 28 April 1777 (aged 52–53); Hornby Hall And Barns Adjoining
- Known for: Court case, Catholic recusant
- Spouse: John Fenwick (1752-1757)
- Parent(s): Thomas and Ann Bennison

Signature
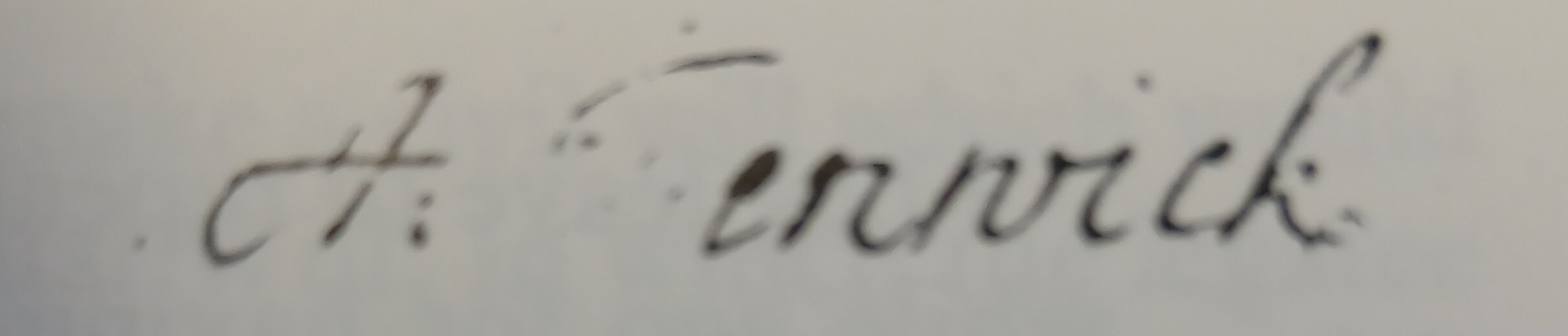

Ann Fenwick (1724 – 28 April 1777) was a British Roman Catholic litigant and heir. She was left great wealth and defended her rights at the House of Lords when her brother-in-law tried to take advantage of the fact that she was neither male nor Protestant. She became a Catholic champion in Lancashire. She was described by Bishop Bernard Charles Foley as "an indomitable woman whose courageous fight for her inheritance, which as a papist she had forfeited, brought to light some of the disabilities under which Catholics were living and so helped to create a climate for toleration."

== Life ==
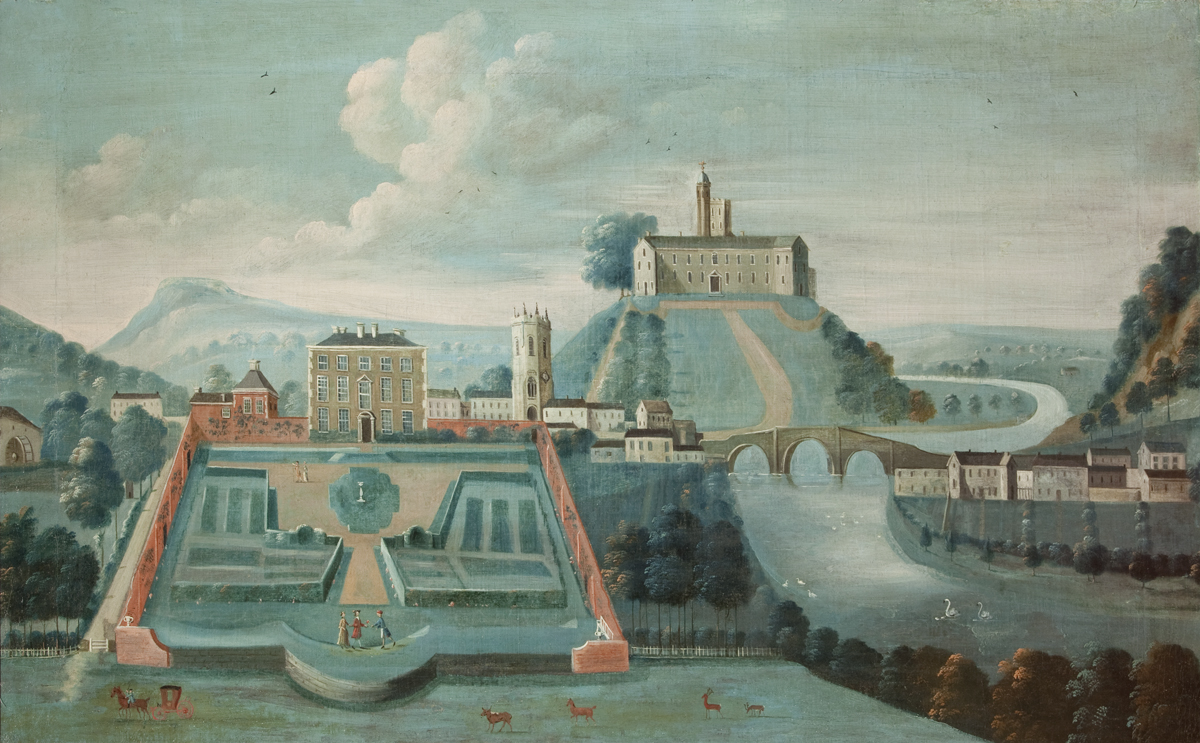
Hornby Hall and Castle (and Fenwick's parents) by Arthur Devis

Fenwick was born into a wealthy family. Her parents were Thomas and Ann (Dowbiggin) Bennison. They had moved into Hornby Hall in 1735. An early picture by Arthur Devis records them arriving in their new home. Thomas died soon after it was built and his will left his house and fortune to his daughter Ann. His wife and Ann's mother was the executor. In 1737 her fortune increased when an uncle died and left her a share in the ship True Love.

Her mother was Catholic and an educated woman whose father had been a leading lawyer. Her mother looked after the property until her daughter was twenty-one. She married a Protestant named John Fenwick in 1752 and her fortune was assigned temporarily to her husband to increase his collateral. However, in 1757, her husband died whilst hunting and the property was still in his name. Meanwhile, Ann was dying of cancer in her home of Hornby Hall. However, the property was destined for her brother-in-law, Thomas Wilson, who was a Gray's Inn barrister and took his brother's surname of Fenwick. The ownership of Hornby Hall was in dispute and Ann accepted an offer from her brother-in-law in 1759. He offered to let her have the use of the hall for her lifetime, a sum of £3,000 and an annuity of £400 per year. Her brother-in-law's career went well and in 1768 he became a Member of Parliament for Westmorland.

However, the £400 per year failed to arrive on time, or at all, and Ann Fenwick went to the courts to enforce the agreement in 1770 since she faced debtor's prison. Her case was undermined because Thomas Fenwick used his status as an MP and she was a Catholic – the law discriminated against litigants who were not Protestants. Despite this, Ann won her case and was awarded £18,000. Her brother-in-law objected to the decision, invoking the penal code against papists and obtained a stay of execution. The Lord Chancellor advised Ann that he would take the matter to the House of Lords to seek a private bill to remedy the situation, and Lord Camden's speech was heard with a unanimous burst of applause. Soon the case had become known not just to the Catholic body but generally. Despite the bill stating it "cannot operate as a precedent to weaken any of the provisions made by the law against Popery" it is commonly held that this case acted as a catalyst in changing public opinion and paving the way for the First Catholic Relief Act of 1778. Her brother-in-law lost the support that had enabled him to be an MP. He was not reelected.

== Religion ==
Fenwick's mother was Catholic, and it was a major part or her life that she greatly enjoyed. She was educated at the secret Catholic school at the Bar Convent in York. In 1762 when her mother died, she lost her good health and she brought a Douai trained priest named Thomas Butler to Hornby where he celebrated Mass. Butler celebrated Mass in Claughton. Despite marrying a Protestant, she reached out to Catholics such as Richard Challoner who gave her books. She accepted her widowhood as a kind of religious state, according to the tradition of the Catholic Church, copying out Instructions for Widows from the Introduction to the Devout Life by St. Francis de Sales. She was known for her works of charity, particularly to poor children and those with learning disabilities. She established a chapel of Claughton and money from her estate provided for the building of the presbytery at Hornby. Her relationship with her brother remained cordial, she wrote following his election to congratulate him. Foley concludes in his life of Ann Fenwick, "Such was the life of one who was a true "confessor". Her example and steadfast faith did much to encourage and sustain not only the small Catholic community in which she lived at Hornby but the widespread Catholic body at large".

== Death ==
Fenwick died in Hornby Hall on 28 April 1777. She was buried with her parents in St Wilfrid's Church, Melling. She left behind detailed wills, writing a civil will on 12 September 1767 and a spiritual one on 19 September the same year. She wrote a second set of wills, a civil one on 10 April 1775 and a spiritual one the following day. Some key elements from her spiritual will include:

"I give leave & bequeath a thousand pounds for the incumbent of Hornby and Claughton for ever. He being a secular Secular Priest & complieing with the obligations annext to it, that is say Mass every Sunday & Holiday throughout the year at either Hornby or Claughton. £500 I leave upon my dear Mothers account & £500 upon my own, and that they remember our Anniversarys, and twice a month to say Mass for us and daily to remember us in their memento, that they be diligent in preaching, catechising & instructing their flock, for the Honour & Glory of God; I also join the sum of £1000 wth: the money left by Mr. Morley & Parkinson, so that the income together may make a comfortable maintenance for a Priest... I recommend the Poor to be his Chief & only care & seriously to consider the great Charge he has undertaken... I sincerely forgive all that injur'd me & humbly beg pardon of all I have injur'd. I hope to die a true tho' an unworthy Member of ye Catholic Church; I beg the Pious Prayers of the Bishop, Grand Vicar & all Priests for the repose of my poor Soul: & I hope they will duly execute the aforesaid Trusts; but if anything be neglected according to my intentions & meaning of having Hornby & Claughton Constantly & regularly supplied on all Sundays & Holidays by an Incumbent resident upon the places; then it is my Will that the sum of one thousand pounds be Given up to the College of Douay for a Fund towards educating Boys for the English Mission, Lancashire Boys to have preference before others" (spelling and grammar as she wrote it)

The second set of wills largely reiterates what she said in her first will but asks that if anything remains from her bequests they should go to the mission of Hornby and its incumbent. Historian John Lingard began an association with Hornby in 1811.
