= Apostolic Catholic Church (Philippines) =

Philippine-based religious organisation

Apostolic Catholic Church
- Classification: Western Christian
- Orientation: Independent Catholic, Protestant
- Polity: Episcopal
- Patriarch: Juan Almario E. M. Calampiano
- Associations: National Council of Churches in the Philippines; Canadian Council of Churches; Christian Conference of Asia; World Council of Churches (through NCCP)
- Region: Philippines, United States of America, Canada, Australia, Hong Kong, Japan, Singapore, Cambodia, United Kingdom, Europe, Middle East, Russia and the Pacific Islands.
- Headquarters: Shrine of the Paraclete
- Founder: John Florentine L. Teruel and Maria Virginia Peñaflor Leonzon
- Origin: 1991; Philippines
- Separated from: Roman Catholicism
- Congregations: 192
- Members: 5,000,000 (2009 estimate)
- Tertiary institutions: College of the Most Holy Trinity and Colegio de Santa Maria Virginia Leonzon

The Apostolic Catholic Church (ACC) (Filipino: Apostolika't Katolikang Simbahan or Simbahang Apostolika Katolika; Spanish: iglesia católica apostólica) is an Independent Catholic denomination established in 1992 by John Florentine L. Teruel. The ACC has its origin as a Catholic organization founded in the 1970s in Hermosa, Bataan.

== History ==
The Apostolic Catholic Church started as a mainstream Catholic lay organization that was founded in Hermosa, Bataan in the early 1970s by Maria Virginia P. Leonzon Teruel.

In 1991 the organization schismed with the Roman Catholic Church; due to varying issues, it formally separated itself from the Roman Catholic Church, when John Florentine Teruel was consecrated as a patriarch and registered the church as both a Protestant and Independent Catholic denomination. But by that time, the movement had already spread throughout the Philippines, Hong Kong, Australia, Canada and the United States of America.

John Florentine Teruel was consecrated as patriarch by the National Conference of Old Catholic and Orthodox Archbishops, on July 13, 1991, at St. Paul's German Old Catholic Church. Florentine ordained several men throughout the Philippines and America to become priests and deacons. Teruel died on 19 January 2021.

Patriarch Juan Almario (born as Elvis Mitra Calampiano) became the second patriarch of the Apostolic Catholic Church. He was consecrated as patriarch through ceremonies held on 31 January 2021. Before his appointment as head of the church, he served as long-time senior archbishop and chancellor to the patriarch at the National Shrine of Ina Poon Bato in Quezon City, Philippines.

== Organization ==
The Apostolic Catholic Church is autocephalous and headed by a patriarch. The church's two ecclesiastical centers, the National Shrine of Ina Poon Bato and the Shrine of the Queen of Patriarchs, are located in Quezon City.

According to the church, one of its initial goals was to unite the Western Rite or the Roman Catholic Church and the Eastern Rite or the Eastern Orthodox Church to form a single catholic church.

The Apostolic Catholic Church currently has three main religious orders and congregations: the Order of the Missionaries of the Holy Spirit, the Order of the Missionaries of John Florentine, and the Congregation of St. Maria Virginia.

The members of the congregations are the archbishops, bishops, priests, deacons, subdeacons, nuns, and third order members, bound by their evangelical vows of chastity, poverty, obedience, acceptance of their immediate superiors to the patriarch and to God the Holy Spirit, whom adherents address as Ingkong (an archaic Tagalog honorific often glossed as "grandfather", used to refer to any elderly man).

The church currently has 32 dioceses worldwide, located all over the Philippines as well as in various key cities of the United States of America, Canada, Australia, Hong Kong, Japan, Singapore, Cambodia, United Kingdom, Europe, Middle East, Russia and the Pacific Islands. The Apostolic Catholic Church is claimed to have more than 5 million members and 192 congregations all over the world.

=== National Shrine of Ina Poon Bato ===
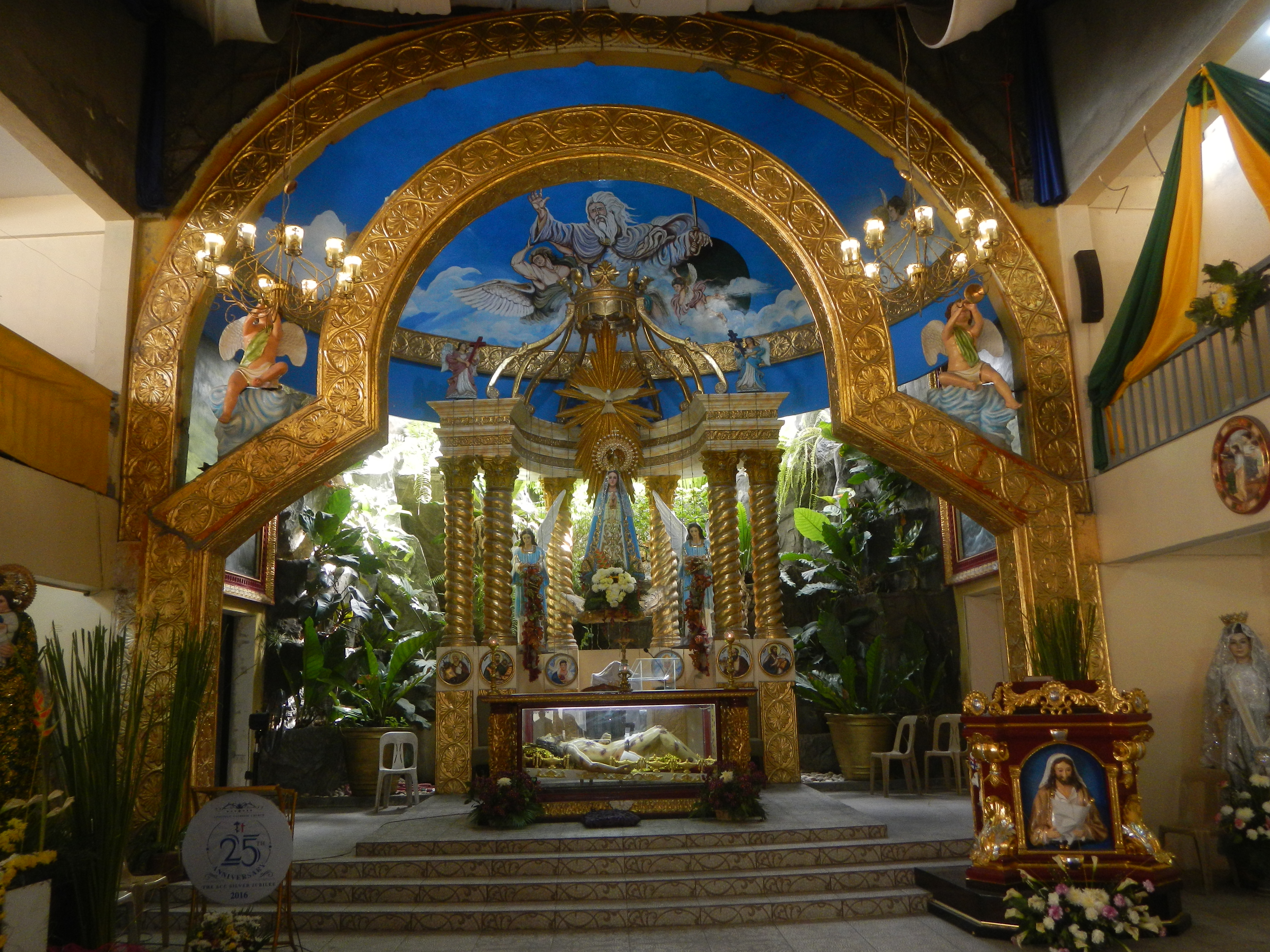
National Shrine of Ina Poon Bato in 2017

The National Shrine of Ina Poon Bato (Filipino: Pambansang Dambana ng Ina Poon Bato) is one of the main cathedrals of the Apostolic Catholic Church and serves as the pontifical seat of Patriarch Juan Almario E.M. Calampiano. The shrine also houses multiple administrative offices of the church.

The shrine was preceded by a chapel built in the 1980s at the northern end of the EDSA dedicated to Our Lady of Ina Poon Bato. The chapel was demolished during the construction of the MRT-3 and its last train station, but a shrine was constructed as a replacement. Although the shrine was initially intended only as a temporary replacement, it became the national shrine and headquarters of the Apostolic Catholic Church in the subsequent years. The canonization of Patriarch John Florentine occurred at the shrine on 1 August 2021.

=== Shrine of the Paraclete ===
The Shrine of the Paraclete is one of the main cathedrals of the Apostolic Catholic Church and serves as the pontifical seat of Patriarch Juan Almario E.M. Calampiano. The shrine also houses multiple administrative offices of the church.

The Shrine of the Paraclete was established as an important secondary church within the Apostolic Catholic Church and was built in early 2022.

== Doctrine ==
The Apostolic Catholic Church treats the Sacrament of Holy Sealing as the Baptism of Fire and Spirit. All members of the church undergo this sealing in order to be recognized as full-fledged members. The church believes that by divine revelation, the third person of the Trinity called himself with the name Ingkong and manifested himself in the Philippines through Maria De Teruel. Members are referred to as apo or tinatakan.

== Ecumenical relations ==
The ACC is part of the National Council of Churches in the Philippines, and the Canadian Council of Churches.

== See also ==
- Christianity in the Philippines
- Religion in the Philippines
- Philippine Independent Church
