= Jean Nicolas Pierre Hachette =

French mathematician (1769–1834)

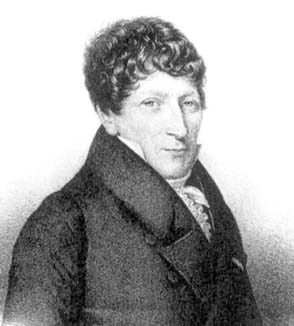
- Born: 6 May 1769; Mézières, France
- Died: 16 January 1834 (aged 64); Paris, France
- Scientific career
- Fields: Mathematics

Jean Nicolas Pierre Hachette (6 May 1769 – 16 January 1834), French mathematician, was born at Mézières, where his father was a bookseller.

For his early education he proceeded first to the college of Charleville, and afterwards to that of Reims. In 1788 he returned to Mézières, where he was attached to the school of engineering as draughtsman to the professors of physics and chemistry. In 1793 he became professor of hydrography at Collioure and Port-Vendre. While there he sent several papers, in which some questions of navigation were treated geometrically, to Gaspard Monge, at that time minister of marine, through whose influence he obtained an appointment in Paris.

Towards the close of 1794, when the École polytechnique was established, he was appointed along with Monge over the department of descriptive geometry. There he instructed some of the ablest Frenchmen of the day, among them SD Poisson, François Arago and A Fresnel. Accompanying Guyton de Morveau in his expedition, earlier in the year, he was present at the battle of Fleurus, and entered Brussels with the French army.

In 1816, on the accession of Louis XVIII, he was expelled from his chair by government. He retained, however, until his death the office of professor in the faculty of sciences in the École normale, to which he had been appointed in 1810. The necessary royal assent was in 1823 refused to the election of Hachette to the Académie des Sciences, and it was not until 1831, after the July Revolution, that he obtained that honour. He died at Paris on 16 January 1834.

Hachette was held in high esteem for his private worth, as well as for his scientific attainments and great public services. His labours were chiefly in the field of descriptive geometry, with its application to the arts and mechanical engineering. It was left to him to develop the geometry of Monge, and to him also is due in great measure the rapid advancement which France made soon after the establishment of the École Polytechnique in the construction of machinery.

Hachette's principal works are:

- Deux Suppléments à la Géométrie descriptive de Monge (1811 and 1818)
- Éléments de géométrie à trois dimensions (1817)
- Collection des épures de géométrie, etc. (1795 and 1817)
- Applications de géométrie descriptive (1817)
- Traité de géométrie descriptive, etc. (1822)
- Traité élémentaire des machines (1811)
- Correspondance sur l'École Polytechnique (1804–1815)

He also contributed many valuable papers to the leading scientific journals of his time. For a list of Hachette's writings see the Catalogue of Scientific Papers of the Royal Society of London; also F Arago, Œuvres (1855); and Silvestre, Notice sur J. N. P. Hachette (Brussels, 1836).
