= Ivan Muravyov-Apostol =

Russian statesman and writer (1762–1851)

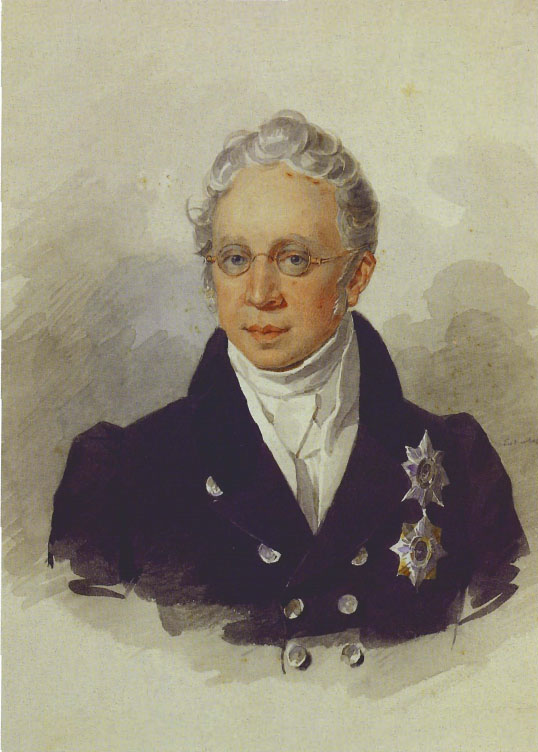
- Portrait of Ivan Muravyov-Apostol by Pyotr Sokolov

Ivan Matveyevich Muravyov-Apostol (Russian: Ива́н Матве́евич Муравьёв-Апо́стол; 12 October [O.S. 1 October] 1762 – 23 March [O.S. 11 March] 1851) was a Russian statesman and writer.

Ivan Muravyov-Apostol came from an old noble family. His father was military engineer Matvei Muravyov and his mother was Elena Apostol, granddaughter of a Zaporozhian hetman Danylo Apostol) (Ivan adopted the last name Muravyov-Apostol at solicitation of his cousin in 1800). Ivan Muravyov-Apostol himself was the father of three Decembrists (besides seven other children) – lieutenant colonel Matvey Muravyov-Apostol (1793-1886), lieutenant colonel Sergey Muravyov-Apostol (1796–1826), and warrant officer Ippolit Muravyov-Apostol (1806–1826).

Ivan Muravyov-Apostol was born near the town of Borovichi in Novgorod guberniya. In 1773, he was turned soldier of the Izmaylovsky Regiment. In 1776–1777, Ivan Muravyov-Apostol attended Leonhard Euler's boarding school and then was home-schooled after its closing. In October 1784, he joined the staff of Saint Petersburg Governor-General Yakov Bruce first as a legal adviser, then as an aide-de-camp (1785), and second major (1788). Also, Muravyov-Apostol served at the Ministry of Foreign Affairs at the Purveyance Department and supervised the Schlisselburg canal as a Premier Major. In 1792, Muravyov-Apostol was introduced to the court of Catherine the Great as a tutor of Grand Duke Alexander Pavlovich and Konstantin Pavlovich. He was then appointed a marshal of ceremonies. Muravyov-Apostol managed to gain the affection of Catherine the Great and even Pavel Petrovich (future emperor), which would affect his further career quite favorably. In December 1796, Ivan Muravyov-Apostol (already Grand Duke Konstantin Pavlovich's chamberlain) was sent as a resident minister to Eutin to represent Russia at the court of Duke Peter of Holstein-Gottorp and Bishop of Lübeck. He combined this post with a similar post in Hamburg (1798) and Copenhagen (late 1799). As a diplomat, Ivan Muravyov-Apostol applied efforts to intensify the activity of the Second Coalition against France. He was a polyglot and was able to speak eight foreign languages, including a few ancient ones. In 1800, Ivan Muravyov-Apostol was recalled to Russia and promoted to privy councilor. In 1801, he was appointed vice president of the Collegium of Foreign Affairs (Ministry of Foreign Affairs). Ivan Muravyov-Apostol never supported Paul I (despite the latter's benevolence towards him) and took part in the 1801 conspiracy against the emperor, becoming the author of one of the unrealized draft laws on legal restriction of sovereign power. In 1802, he was appointed Russia's envoy to Spain, only to be dismissed four years later for some obscure reasons. Ivan Muravyov-Apostol was not in the service until 1824. That same year he became a member of the Governing Senate and a member of the General Board of Educational Institutions (Главное училищ правление). In the 1820s, Ivan Muravyov-Apostol's liberal views on certain issues received much public attention and gained him prominence. For example, he made a stand for Vasili Popov, the director of the Department of Public Education, who had taken part in the translation of a mystical book by Johannes Gossner banned in Russia. Also, Ivan Muravyov-Apostol asserted the right of universities and professors to make use of books disregarding the official censorship. He stood for the teaching of philosophy at the universities, contravening the official stance of a powerful statesman, Mikhail Magnitsky, who had been overseeing the educational affairs at that time.

In 1826, the family of Ivan Muravyov-Apostol suffered through an immense tragedy. After the suppression of the Decembrist Revolt, his youngest son Ippolit Muravyov-Apostol shot himself, not wanting to surrender to the authorities. His older son Sergey Muravyov-Apostol was hanged with four other leading Decembrists. His oldest son Matvey Muravyov-Apostol was sentenced to 15 years of katorga, which would later be changed to exile in Siberia. Ivan Muravyov-Apostol left the service after the revolt and was then officially discharged in May 1826. He was registered as an "absent" senator up until 1847, all that time living mainly in Vienna and Florence. Ivan Muravyov-Apostol's name completely disappeared from the mainstream Russian press from 1826 until the late 1850s (even though he returned to Russia in the 1840s).

Ivan Muravyov-Apostol died in Saint Petersburg in March 1851 and was interred at the Georgiyevskoye Cemetery.

Ivan Muravyov-Apostol is also known to have been a litterateur. He participated in the proceedings of a literary club called Conversations of the Admirers of the Russian Language ("Беседы любителей русского слова"). Also, Ivan Muravyov-Apostol was a member of the Free Society of the Admirers of the Russian Literature (Вольное общество любителей российской словесности). He was an active member of the Russian Academy of Sciences (since 1811) and honorary member of Saint Petersburg Academy of Sciences. Ivan Muravyov-Apostol's most significant work was a book called Journey Across the Tauride in 1820. It contains valuable information on archaeology, flora and fauna of the Crimea, unique features of urban, rural and monastic life of this region, and colorful depictions of its customs.

According to testimonies of Ivan Muravyov-Apostol's contemporaries (such as Konstantin Batyushkov, Nikolai Grech and others), he was a man of a brilliant mind, esthete, polyglot, and bibliophile. Ivan Muravyov-Apostol ranged almost all of Europe and met many prominent people, such as Immanuel Kant, Friedrich Gottlieb Klopstock, Vittorio Alfieri, and George Byron. He is known to have been a tyrant to his family members, an epicurean, and a squanderer (dissipated several millions of rubles of fortune).
