= Reformed Old Apostolic Church =

Christian denomination

The Reformed Old Apostolic Church is a chiliastic denomination with roots in the Catholic Apostolic Church and the Old Apostolic Church. It has approximately 180,000 members.

== History ==
The Reformed Old Apostolic Church broke away from the Old Apostolic Church.

The ROAC was initially called the Non-White Old Apostolic Church but was forced to change its name after a 1975 court case Old Apostolic Church of Africa v. Non-White Old Apostolic Church of Africa which decided in favour of the Old Apostolic Church, on the basis of the law of passing off.
