= United Apostolic Church =

The member churches of the United Apostolic Church are independent communities in the tradition of the Catholic Apostolic revival movement.
