= Americana (Leon Russell album) =

Studio album by Leon Russell
- Released: 1978
- Recorded: 1978
- Studios: Paradise (Burbank, California)
- Length: 32:30
- Label: Paradise
- Producer: Leon Russell

Leon Russell chronology
Make Love to the Music (1977)	Americana (1978)	One for the Road (1979)

Professional ratings
Review scores
Source	Rating
AllMusic	3.5/5 stars
Christgau's Record Guide	C−

Americana is an album by singer and songwriter Leon Russell. The album peaked at number 115 on the US Billboard 200. The album was first released as a vinyl LP Album by Leon's new label Paradise Records. Americana was re-released on CD by Wounded Bird Records in 2007 and again in 2012 by Ais. The album was by produced by Leon Russell.

The new releases were after Leon recordings earned six gold records. He received two Grammy Awards from seven nominations. In 2011, Leon was inducted into both the Rock and Roll Hall of Fame and the Songwriters Hall of Fame. One of his biggest early fans, Elton John, said Russell was a "mentor" and an "inspiration". They recorded their album The Union in 2010, which earned them a Grammy nomination.

== Track listing ==
Side one

1. "Let's Get Started" (Kim Fowley, Leon Russell) – 4:12
2. "Elvis and Marilyn" (Dyan Diamond, Kim Fowley, Leon Russell) – 3:04
3. "From Maine to Mexico" (Kim Fowley, Leon Russell) – 3:09
4. "When a Man Loves a Woman" (A. Wright, C. Lewis) – 3:22
5. "It's Only Me" (Dyan Diamond, Leon Russell) – 2:20

Side two

1. "Midnight Lover" (Kim Fowley, Leon Russell) – 4:08
2. "Housewife" (Dyan Diamond, Kim Fowley, Leon Russell) – 3:02
3. "Ladies of the Night" (Kim Fowley, Leon Russell) – 3:03
4. "Shadow and Me" (Leon Russell) – 3:06
5. "Jesus on My Side" (Kim Fowley, Leon Russell) – 3:04

== Personnel ==
- Leon Russell – guitars, keyboards and piano, bass, vocals
- Joe Chemay – bass, vocals, backing vocals
- Marty Grebb – guitar, saxophone, trumpet
- Wornell Jones – vocals, backing vocals
- Joe Chemay – backing vocals
- Lee Loughnane – horn arrangements, trumpet
- Mike Meros – keyboards, organ, synthesizer
- Brent Nelson – drums, main personnel, backing vocals
- James Pankow – trombone
- Walter Parazaider – tenor saxophone, saxophone, vocals
- Mark Peters – orchestral arrangements
- Jon Woodhead – guitar
- Frank Latouf – technician
- Mike Johnstone – technician
- Steve Marr – technician
- Tom Kemp – technician
- Paul Hodara – photography
- Gene Meros and Steve Ripley – recording
- Scott Goddard – other

== Charts ==
Chart performance for Americana
Chart (1978)	Peak position
Australian Albums (Kent Music Report)	95
US Billboard 200	115
