= One for the Road (Willie Nelson and Leon Russell album) =

1979 album by Willie Nelson and Leon Russell

Studio album by Willie Nelson and Leon Russell
- Released: 1979
- Recorded: 1979
- Studio: Paradise (Burbank, California)
- Genre: Country; pop standards
- Length: 56:57
- Label: Columbia
- Producer: Willie Nelson, Leon Russell

Willie Nelson and Leon Russell chronology
Americana (1978)	One for the Road (1979)	Life and Love (1979)

One for the Road is an album by the American musicians Willie Nelson and Leon Russell, released in 1979 as a double vinyl LP by Columbia Records. Produced by the pair, the album was recorded in Leon's new facility, Paradise Studios, in Burbank, California. The album peaked at No. 25 on the US Billboard 200 chart, No. 3 on US country albums chart, No. 28 on the Canada albums chart, No. 1 on the Canada country albums chart and No. 11 on the New Zealand albums chart. The album has gold certification for sales of over 500,000 albums in the US and Canada . It was re-released on CD in 1989, 2008 and 2017.

== Critical reception ==
Professional ratings
Review scores
Source	Rating
AllMusic	4/5 stars
Christgau's Record Guide	B−
MusicHound Folk: The Essential Album Guide	3/5 stars
The Rolling Stone Album Guide	3/5 stars

The Boston Globe noted that "Nelson and Russell do have a few years, perhaps even a generation, on much of their audience, but this kind of lead weighted schmaltz is enough to make anyone old before his or her time."

== Track listing ==
1. "Detour" (Paul Westmoreland) - 2:24
2. "I Saw the Light" (Hank Williams) - 3:04
3. "Heartbreak Hotel" (Mae Boren Axton, Tommy Durden, Elvis Presley) - 3:00
4. "Let the Rest of the World Go By" (Ernest Ball, J. Keirn Brennan) - 3:46
5. "Trouble in Mind" (Richard M. Jones) - 2:40
6. "Don't Fence Me In" (Cole Porter) - 2:25
7. "The Wild Side of Life" (Arlie Carter, William Warren) - 3:21
8. "Ridin' Down the Canyon" (Gene Autry, Smiley Burnette) - 3:20
9. "Sioux City Sue" (Dick Thomas, Ray Freedman) - 3:15
10. "You Are My Sunshine" (Charles Mitchell, Jimmie Davis) - 2:49
11. "Danny Boy" (Frederic Weatherly) - 3:58
12. "Always" (Irving Berlin) - 2:16
13. "Summertime" (Dudley Heyward, George Gershwin) - 2:27
14. "Because of You" (Dudly Wilkinson) - 2:04
15. "Am I Blue?" (Grant Clarke, Harry Akst) - 2:16
16. "Tenderly" (Jack Lawrence, Walter Gross) - 3:58
17. "Far Away Places" (Alex Kramer, Joan Whitney Kramer) - 3:08
18. "That Lucky Old Sun" (Beasley Smith, Haven Gillespie) - 2:38
19. "Stormy Weather" (Harold Arlen, Ted Koehler) - 2:35
20. "One for My Baby (and One More for the Road)" (Harold Arlen, Johnny Mercer) - 2:32

== Charts ==
Chart (1979)	Peak position
Australia (Kent Music Report)	85
United States (Billboard 200)	25

== Personnel ==
- Leon Russell: guitar, keyboards, piano, primary artist, vocals
- Willie Nelson: guitar, performer, primary artist, producer, vocals
- Jim Boatman: vocals (background)
- Ambrose Campbell: percussion
- Paul English: drums
- Chris Ethridge: bass
- John Gallie: organ
- Marty Grebb: saxophone
- Rex Ludwick: drums
- Maria Muldaur: guest artist, vocals (background)
- Jody Payne: guitar, vocals (background)
- Bonnie Raitt: guest artist, slide guitar
- Mickey Raphael: guest artist, harmonica
- Bernie Grundman: engineer
