= Life and Love (Leon Russell album) =

Studio album by Leon Russell
- Released: 1979
- Recorded: 1979
- Studios: Paradise (Burbank, California)
- Length: 34:13
- Labels: Paradise and Warner
- Producer: Leon Russell

Leon Russell chronology
One for the Road (1979)	Life and Love (1979)	The Live Album (Leon Russell and New Grass Revival) (1981)

Life and Love is an album by singer and songwriter Leon Russell. The album was recorded in Russell's new studios, Paradise Studios in Burbank, California, and produced and written by Russell. The album was first released as a vinyl LP, 8-track tape and cassette tape by Paradise Records and Warner Records in 1979, and re-released on CD in 2007 and 2012.

Russell used electronic drums on this album for the first time, courtesy of Roger Linn who had invented the Linn LM-1, a pioneering version of the drum machine, making Russell an early user of this new instrument. Roger Linn started a company Moffett Electronics to sell his electronic drums at the same time as Leon's Life and Love album in 1979.

After releasing Life and Love Leon Russell went on tour with the group New Grass Revival for two years. From that tour Leon released two live albums with New Grass Revival, The Live Album with The New Grass Revival and Live And Pickling Fast.

== Critical reception ==
The Globe and Mail determined that "there is nothing here to compare with the tender charm of 'A Song For You' (which obviously was a lucky fluke) just a bevy of tedious tunes drawled in an irritating manner... Leon Russell should have been placed in a time capsule in 1970."

Country Music: The Encyclopedia reviewed Life and Love: "A new collection of Leon's came out on Paradises titled Life and Love, that was consistently strong in music and performance. The album present both sides of Leon – several fine country and country rock tracks and a number of blues rockers that harked back to his work in the early 1970."

== Track listing ==
All songs composed by Leon Russell.

Side one

1. "One More Love Song" – 4:01
2. "You Girl" – 3:26
3. "Struck by Lightning" – 2:51
4. "Strange Love" – 4:06
5. "Life and Love" – 3:21

Side two

1. "On the First Day" – 4:21
2. "High Horse" – 4:41
3. "Sweet Mystery" – 5:13
4. "On the Borderline" – 2:15

== Charts ==
Chart (1979)	Peak position
United States (Billboard 200)	204

== Personnel ==
- Leon Russell – guitar, keyboards, piano, vocals, producer, composition
- Roger Linn – co-producer, drums, Moffett Electronics, engineer, guitar
- Marty Grebb – guitar, saxophone
- Jody Payne, Roger Linn – guitar
- Mickey Raphael – harmonica
- Bernetta Rand – backing vocals
- Frances Pye – backing vocals
- Joe Chemay – backing vocals
- Lena Luckey – backing vocals
- Wornell Jones – backing vocals
- Tom Kemp – photography
