= Looking Back (Leon Russell album) =

Studio album by Leon Russell
- Released: 1973
- Length: 23:46
- Label: Olympic Records

Leon Russell chronology
Carney (1972)	Looking Back (1973)	Leon Live (1973)

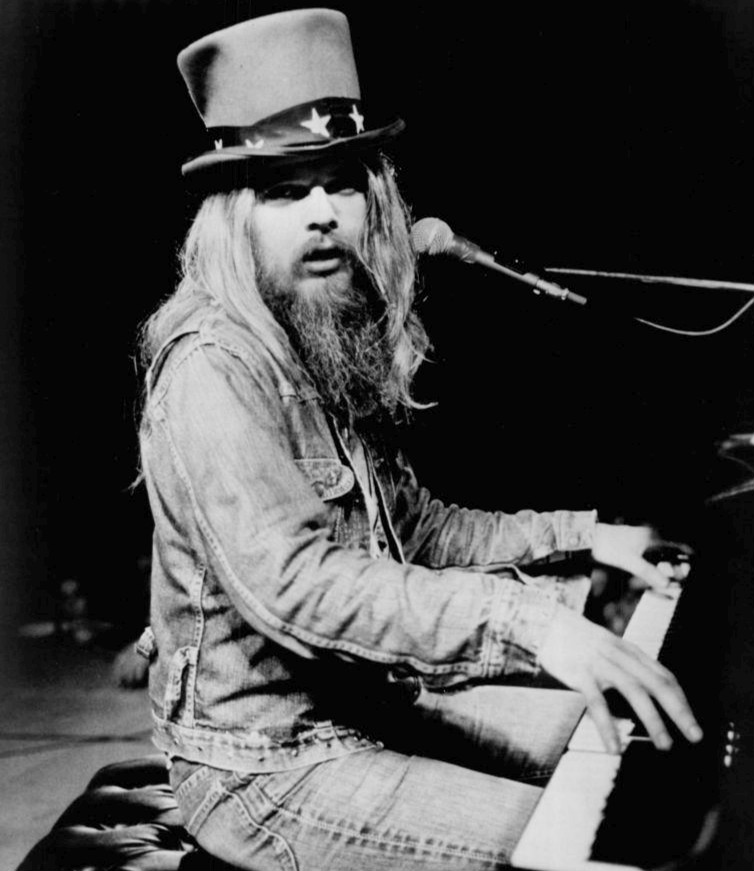
Leon Russell in 1973, Shelter Records file photo

Looking Back is the fourth solo studio album by Leon Russell. The album was released in 1973, shortly after the success of his single song "Tightrope". The album is not an official release: it features instrumental tracks that were recorded in the mid-1960s. Some of the songs feature Russell playing the harpsichord. The record and album sleeve do not have any credits for the songs. Released on Olympic Records Corporation label. There was short issue new CD reissue in 1991 on the Japanese Jimco label, with three bonus tracks.

Professional ratings
Review scores
Source	Rating
Allmusic	2/5 stars

== Track listing ==
Side One

1. "If I Had a Hammer" (Pete Seeger/ Lee Hays) - 2:49
2. "Gospel Harp" - 2:05
3. "Greenfields" (Miller/Dehr/Gilkyson) - 2:15
4. "Virginia" - 2:27
5. "Our Winter Love" (Johnny Cowell) - 2:37

Side Two

1. "Cotton Fields" (Huddie Ledbetter) - 2:27
2. "Cherry Beat" - 2:31
3. "Greenback Dollar" (Hoyt Axton) - 2:02
4. "Man with the Golden Gun" - 2:14
5. "Tender and Fair" - 2:19

The 1991 Jimco reissue contains the following bonus tracks:

1. "Barbados"
2. "Ridin' West"
3. "Walk Right In"

The album contains instrumental tracks that were recorded in the mid-1960s, featuring Russell on harpsichord. Neither the record nor album sleeve give writing credits for any of the songs. Songwriting credits are listed here where applicable.

== Personnel ==
- Leon Russell – harpsichord, bass guitar, guitar, keyboards, piano, producer
- Tommy Tedesco – guitar
- Jimmy Bend – bass guitar
- Earl Palmer – drums
- Joe Chemay – bass
- Marty Grebb – guitar, saxophone
- Roger Linn – guitar, percussion
- Jody Payne – guitar
- Mickey Raphael – harmonica
