= In Your Dreams (Leon Russell album) =

Studio album by Leon Russell
- Released: January 22, 2008
- Recorded: 2003
- Genre: Rock
- Length: 42:24
- Label: Leon Russell Records

Leon Russell chronology
Almost Piano (2008)	In Your Dreams (2008)	A Mighty Flood (2008)

In Your Dreams is an album by singer, multi-instrumentalist and songwriter Leon Russell. Produced by Russell, the album was released on January 22, 2008, by his label, Leon Russell Records. The album was recorded in 2003, but not released until 2008. The song Big Lips, on In Your Dreams, Russell also included on his Life Journey Album released by Tommy LiPuma-produced in 2014. Rock critic Nick DeRiso wrote: "Nothing quite matches Russell interpreting Russell, as heard on Big Lips — which also features Chris Simmons on slide, Abe Laboriel Jr. on drums and Willie Weeks on bass." In Leon's Life Journey album which also has Big Lips, Leon renewed his song writing after his 2010 collaboration album with Elton John, The Union.

== Track listing ==
All songs written by Leon Russell.

1. "I Love the Way You Love Me" – 4:54
2. "Oklahoma Boogie" – 3:19
3. "Lover's Hideaway" – 2:56
4. "Big Lips" – 3:45
5. "End of a Love Affair" – 3:23
6. "Love Can Hurt You So" – 4:30
7. "I Wanna Make Love to You" – 3:44
8. "Down in Louisiana" – 3:00
9. "Perfect Love" – 3:48
10. "A Little Thing Called Love" – 3:29
11. "Last Dance" – 2:40
12. "Down in Dixieland" – 2:56
