= Rhythm & Bluegrass: Hank Wilson, Vol. 4 =

Studio album by Leon Russell and New Grass Revival
- Released: October 23, 2001
- Recorded: 1980s
- Studios: Paradise Studios, Burbank, CA
- Genre: Bluegrass
- Length: 30:27
- Label: Leon Russell Records
- Producer: Leon Russell

Leon Russell and New Grass Revival chronology
Guitar Blues (1995)	Rhythm & Bluegrass: Hank Wilson, Vol. 4 (2001)	Moonlight & Love Songs (2002)

Professional ratings
Review scores
Source	Rating
Allmusic	3.5/5 stars

Rhythm & Bluegrass: Hank Wilson, Vol. 4 is an album by singer and songwriter Leon Russell and the band New Grass Revival with Russell singing under the pseudonym Hank Wilson. Produced by Russell, the album was recorded in the 1980 but was not released until October 23, 2001. This is Russell's second album with New Grass Revival, who became his backup group and opening act in 1979.

== Background ==
Leon Russell was born in Oklahoma, had a home in Tulsa, and grew up around country and blues music. After making successful rock albums, touring, and releasing the concert album Leon Live, he returned to his roots under the name of a fictional musical personality: Hank Wilson. Leon Russell and some of his close friends from both Los Angeles and Nashville recorded the honky tonk songs between February 26 and February 28, 1973.

- Russell made a total of four Hank Wilson albums:
  - Hank Wilson's Back Vol. I (1973)
  - Hank Wilson, Vol. II (1984)
  - Legend in My Time: Hank Wilson Vol. III (1998)
  - Rhythm & Bluegrass: Hank Wilson, Vol. 4 (2001)
    - In 2009 Russell released the album Best of Hank Wilson

== Track listing ==
1. "I've Just Seen a Face" (Paul McCartney, John Lennon) – 1:43
2. "Footprints in the Snow" (Bill Monroe) – 2:47
3. "Columbus Stockade Blues" (Jimmie Davis, Leon Russell, Traditional) – 2:51
4. "I Believe My Soul" (Ray Charles) – 3:12
5. "Rough and Rocky Road" (Russell, Traditional) – 3:12
6. "Mystery Train" (Junior Parker, Sam Phillips) – 2:46
7. "When My Blue Moon Turns to Gold Again (Wiley Walker, Gene Sullivan) – 2:06
8. "In the Pines" (Huddie Ledbetter, Alan Riggs, Russell) – 2:32
9. "Open Up the Door" (Russell, Traditional) – 2:09
10. "Bluebirds Are Singing for Me" (Mac Wiseman, Lester Flatt) – 1:49
11. "Rhythm and Bluegrass" (Russell) – 2:34
12. "Pilgrim Land" (Russell) – 2:39

== Personnel ==
- Leon Russell – guitar, keyboards, piano, vocals
- Courtney Johnson – banjo, backing vocals
- John Cowan with New Grass Revival – bass, backing vocals
- Sam Bush with New Grass Revival – mandolin, fiddle, backing vocals
- Curtis Burch with New Grass Revival – guitar, Dobro, backing vocals
- Bill Kenner – mandolin
- Ambrose Campbell – percussion
