= The Union (Elton John and Leon Russell album) =

Studio album by Elton John and Leon Russell
- Released: 19 October 2010
- Recorded: 20 November 2009 – March 2010
- Studios: The Village Recorder (Los Angeles, California); Quad Studios (Nashville, Tennessee); Silent Sound Studios (Atlanta, Georgia)
- Genres: Rhythm and blues; rock; country rock; blues rock
- Length: 63:12 (standard album); 66:28 (iTunes deluxe LP); 71:22 (deluxe CD and vinyl)
- Labels: Decca (US); Mercury (UK)
- Producer: T Bone Burnett

Elton John chronology
Rocket Man: The Definitive Hits (2007)	The Union (2010)	Gnomeo & Juliet (Original Soundtrack) (2011)

Leon Russell chronology
A Mighty Flood (2008)	The Union (2010)	Life Journey (2014)

The Union is a collaboration studio album by singer-songwriters Elton John and Leon Russell, released on 19 October 2010 in the US and on 25 October in the UK. This is John's second collaboration album, after 1993's Duets. This is the first studio release by John since 1979's Victim of Love without any of his regular Elton John Band members. It is also his highest charting studio album on the Billboard 200 since 1976's Blue Moves, debuting at No. 3, as well as Russell's highest charting studio album since 1972's Carney. The Union was No. 3 on Rolling Stone magazine's list of the 30 Best Albums of 2010.

The album features appearances by Booker T. Jones (on Hammond B-3), Neil Young (vocals), Robert Randolph (pedal steel), and Brian Wilson (vocal harmonies). This album was dedicated to Guy Babylon, John's keyboard player who died a year before its release. "If It Wasn't for Bad" was nominated for the 53rd Annual Grammy Awards for Best Pop Collaboration with Vocals and "Hey Ahab" became a staple in John's concert tours.

== Reception ==
Professional ratings
Aggregate scores
Source	Rating
Metacritic	76/100
Review scores
Source	Rating
Allmusic	3.5/5 stars
Clash	8/10 stars
Consequence of Sound	4/5 stars
Contactmusic.com	4/5 stars
Daily Mirror	4/5 stars
Financial Times	4/5 stars
The Guardian	4/5 stars
The Independent	5/5 stars
Los Angeles Times	3/4 stars
Rolling Stone	5/5 stars
Uncut	4/5 stars

The Union received mostly positive reviews with critics praising it as some of the pair's best work to date. It reached No. 3 on Rolling Stone magazine's list of the 30 Best Albums of 2010.

=== Accolades ===
==== Grammy Awards ====
Nominations for The Union
Year	Nominee / work	Award	Result
2011	"If It Wasn't for Bad"	Best Pop Collaboration with Vocals	Nominated

== Track listing ==
No.	Title	Writer(s)	Length
1.	"If It Wasn't for Bad"	Leon Russell	3:43
2.	"Eight Hundred Dollar Shoes"	Elton John, Bernie Taupin	3:23
3.	"Hey Ahab"	John, Taupin	5:39
4.	"Gone to Shiloh" (featuring Neil Young)	John, Taupin	4:50
5.	"Hearts Have Turned to Stone" (moved to twelfth track on some CD copies)	Russell	3:47
6.	"Jimmie Rodgers' Dream"	John, Taupin, T Bone Burnett	3:42
7.	"There's No Tomorrow"	John, Russell, Burnett, James Timothy Shaw	3:45
8.	"Monkey Suit"	John, Taupin	4:46
9.	"The Best Part of the Day"	John, Taupin	4:45
10.	"A Dream Come True"	John, Russell	5:07
11.	"I Should Have Sent Roses"	Russell, Taupin	5:21
12.	"When Love Is Dying"	John, Taupin	4:51
13.	"My Kind of Hell" (bonus track on iTunes digital deluxe LP, deluxe CD and vinyl only)	John, Taupin	3:16
14.	"Mandalay Again" (bonus track on deluxe CD and vinyl only)	John, Taupin	4:54
15.	"Never Too Old (To Hold Somebody)"	John, Taupin	4:58
16.	"In the Hands of Angels"	Russell	4:43

== Personnel ==
Musicians and vocalists

- Elton John – vocals (1–15), acoustic piano (2–4, 6–15)
- Leon Russell – vocals, acoustic piano
- Keefus Ciancia – keyboards (1–15)
- Booker T. Jones – Hammond B3 organ (1, 5, 9, 11)
- Marty Grebb – keyboards (7, 16)
- Marc Ribot – guitars (1–4, 6, 7, 9, 10, 13–15), acoustic guitar (8)
- T Bone Burnett – electric guitar (3, 6, 12)
- Doyle Bramhall II – guitars (5, 11)
- Jason Wormer – dulcimer (4), handclaps (10)
- Russ Pahl – pedal steel guitar (6)
- Robert Randolph – pedal steel guitar (7)
- Dennis Crouch – acoustic bass (1–4, 6–10, 12–15)
- Davey Faragher – bass (5)
- Don Was – bass (5, 11)
- Drew Lambert – electric bass (16)
- Jay Bellerose – drums (1–15), percussion (1–9, 12–15)
- Jim Keltner – drums (1–9, 11–15), percussion (1–9, 12–15)
- Mike Piersante – tambourine (3, 8), handclaps (10)
- Debra Dobkin – beaded gourd (6)
- Kyle Ford – handclaps (10)
- Tom Peterson – saxophones (5, 8, 11, 13)
- Joe Sublett – saxophones (5, 8, 11, 13)
- Jim Thompson – saxophones (5, 8, 11, 13)
- George Bohanon – trombone (1, 4, 11), baritone horn (1, 4, 11)
- Ira Nepus – trombone (1, 4, 11)
- Maurice Spears – trombone (1, 4, 11)
- Darrell Leonard – trumpet (1, 4, 5, 8, 11, 13), bass trumpet (1, 11, 13)
- William Roper – tuba (1, 4, 11)
- Judith Hill – backing vocals (1, 3, 5, 7, 8, 10, 13, 14, 16)
- Alfie Silas-Durio – backing vocals (1, 3, 5, 7, 8, 10, 12–16)
- Rose Stone – backing vocals (1, 3, 8, 10, 12, 16), tambourine (10)
- Tata Vega – backing vocals (1–3, 5–10, 12–16)
- Jean Witherspoon – backing vocals (1, 3, 5, 7, 8, 10, 12, 16)
- Bill Cantos – backing vocals (2, 3, 6, 8, 9, 12–16)
- Lou Pardini – backing vocals (2, 6, 9, 12, 15)
- Jason Scheff – backing vocals (2, 6, 9, 12, 15)
- Tanya Balam – backing vocals (3, 8, 16)
- Kellye Huff – backing vocals (3, 8, 16)
- Perry Morgan – backing vocals (3, 8, 16)
- Tiffany Smith – backing vocals (3, 8, 16)
- Neil Young – vocals (4)
- Brian Wilson – backing vocals (12)

Music arrangements

- Darrell Leonard – horn arrangements and conductor (1, 4, 5, 8, 11, 13)
- Bill Maxwell – BGV conductor (1–3, 5–10, 12–16), BGV arrangements (2, 3, 6, 8, 9, 13–15), additional BGV arrangements (12)
- Leon Russell – BGV arrangements (1, 5, 7, 10, 16)
- Brian Wilson – BGV arrangements (12)

== Production ==
- Johnny Barbis – executive producer, management for Leon Russell
- Elton John – executive producer, liner notes
- T Bone Burnett – producer
- Adrian Collee – production coordinator
- Jon Howard – production coordinator
- Ivy Skoff – production coordinator
- Julie Eidsvoog – music transcription
- John Eidsvoog – music transcription
- Peacock – design
- Annie Leibovitz – cover art photography, booklet back cover photography, photography (p. 12 & 13)
- Joseph Guay – additional photography (gatefold, inside left)
- Frank W. Ockenfels 3 – photography of T Bone Burnett (p. 23)
- Steve Todoroff – photography of Leon Russell (gatefold, inside right)
- Rocket Music Entertainment Group – management for Elton John
- Leroy Jenkins – management for T Bone Burnett
- Jessica C. Mitchell – personal assistant to T Bone Burnett

Technical credits

- Gavin Lurssen – mastering at Lurssen Mastering (Hollywood, California)
- Mike Piersante – recording, mixing
- Jason Wormer – recording, editing
- Ben McAmis – additional engineer
- Kyle Ford – additional engineer
- Mark Lambert – additional engineer
- Kory Aaron – assistant engineer
- Brett Lind – assistant engineer
- Chris Owens – assistant engineer
- Vanessa Parr – assistant engineer
- Paul Ackling – guitar technician

== Charts ==
Chart performance for The Union
Chart (2010)	Peak position
Australian Albums (ARIA)	28
Austrian Albums (Ö3 Austria)	28
Belgian Albums (Ultratop Flanders)	66
Belgian Albums (Ultratop Wallonia)	91
Canadian Albums (Billboard)	7
Danish Albums (Hitlisten)	15
Dutch Albums (Album Top 100)	60
French Albums (SNEP)	51
German Albums (Offizielle Top 100)	23
Greek Albums (IFPI)	62
Irish Albums (IRMA)	52
Italian Albums (FIMI)	28
New Zealand Albums (RMNZ)	24
Norwegian Albums (VG-lista)	5
Scottish Albums (Official Charts)	12
Spanish Albums (Promusicae)	30
Swedish Albums (Sverigetopplistan)	24
Swiss Albums (Schweizer Hitparade)	27
UK Albums (Official Charts)	12
US Billboard 200	3

== Certifications and sales ==
Certifications and sales for The Union
Region	Certification	Certified units/sales
Canada (Music Canada)	Gold	40,000^{^}
United Kingdom (BPI)	Silver	60,000^{^}
United States	—	329,000
^{^} Shipments figures based on certification alone.
