= Legend in My Time: Hank Wilson Vol. III =

My Time: Hank Wilson Vol. III

Studio album by Hank Wilson
- Released: 1998
- Genre: Country
- Length: 40:10
- Label: Leon Russell Records - Ark 21 Records
- Producer: Leon Russell

Hank Wilson chronology
Hymns of Christmas (1995)	My Time: Hank Wilson Vol. III (1998)	Face in the Crowd (1999)

Professional ratings
Review scores
Source	Rating
Allmusic	3.5/5 stars

Legend in My Time: Hank Wilson Vol. III is an album by singer and songwriter Leon Russell singing as Hank Wilson. The album was recorded in 1995. The album has classic country and bluegrass tunes and was produced by Leon Russell. CD was released by Ark 21 Records. The CD includes a 21-minute conversation between Russell and Harold Bradley about the songs on the album and stories they remembered.

== Background ==
Leon Russell was born in Oklahoma, had a home in Tulsa, and grew up around country and blues music. After making successful rock albums, touring, and releasing the concert album Leon Live, he returned to his roots under the name of a fictional musical personality: Hank Wilson. The first Hank Wilson album called Hank Wilson's Back Vol. I was made by Leon Russell and some of his close friends from both Los Angeles and Nashville, and recorded the honky tonk songs between February 26 and February 28, 1973.

- Russell made a total of four Hank Wilson albums:
  - Hank Wilson's Back Vol. I (1973)
  - Hank Wilson, Vol. II (1984)
  - Legend in My Time: Hank Wilson Vol. III (1998)
  - Rhythm & Bluegrass: Hank Wilson, Vol. 4 (2001)
    - In 2009 Russell released the album Best of Hank Wilson

== Track listing ==
1. "Sixteen Tons" (Merle Travis) – 2:46
2. "Night Life" (Paul Buskirk, Walter Breeland, Willie Nelson) – 3:39
3. "Act Naturally" (John Russell, Voni Morrison) – 3:08
4. "Sweet Dreams" (Don Gibson) – 3:58
5. "Daddy Sang Bass" (Carl Perkins) – 2:28
6. "He Stopped Loving Her Today" (with Willie Nelson) (Claude Putnam, Robert Braddock) – 3:46
7. "Mammas Don't Let Your Babies Grow Up to Be Cowboys" (Ed Bruce, Patsy Bruce) – 2:40
8. "Funny How Time Slips Away" (Willie Nelson) – 3:12
9. "Okie From Muskogee" (Merle Haggard, Roy Burris) – 3:02
10. "Crazy" (Willie Nelson) – 3:47
11. "Love's Gonna Live Here" (Buck Owens) – 2:05
12. "He'll Have to Go" (Audrey Allison, Joe Allison) – 2:45
13. "A Legend in My Time" (Don Gibson) – 2:40
14. Audio Liner Notes by Leon Russell and Harold Bradley – 21:35

== Personnel ==
- Leon Russell - lead vocals, piano
- Harold Bradley, Pat Flynn - acoustic guitar
- Jackie Wessel - backing vocals
- Butch Robins - banjo
- Eddie Bayers, Harry Stinson - drums
- David Smith, Pete Wade - electric guitar
- Mickey Raphael - harmonica
- Marty Stuart - mandolin
- Leroy Roselle - piano
- Sonny Garrish - steel guitar
