= Make Love to the Music =

Studio album by Leon & Mary Russell
- Released: 1977
- Studios: Paradise, Tia Juana, Oklahoma
- Length: 33:36
- Label: Paradise
- Producer: Leon Russell

Leon & Mary Russell chronology
Wedding Album (1976)	Make Love to the Music (1977)	Americana (1978)

Make Love to the Music is an album by Leon & Mary Russell, released in 1977 by Paradise Records. There were two CD re-releases one in 2007 by Wounded Bird Records and a second in 2012 by AIS Records.

== Critical reception ==
The Los Angeles Times wrote that Mary "is a convincing individual singer, but her soulful wailings have yet to mix naturally with her husband's own brand of rambling boogie fever."

== Track listing ==
All tracks composed by Leon Russell, except where indicated
Side 1

1. "Easy Love" – 3:58
2. "Joyful Noise" – 3:38
3. "Now Now Boogie" (Gary Ogan, Russell) – 2:55
4. "Say You Will" (Ogan, Russell) – 3:38
5. "Make Love to the Music" – 3:54

Side 2

1. "Love Crazy" – 2:58
2. "Love Is in Your Eyes" – 2:49
3. "Hold On to This Feeling" – 3:51
4. "Island in the Sun" – 5:55

== Personnel ==
- Karl Himmel (2, 8), Greg Thomas (1, 7), Gary Ogan (3, 4, 6, 9), Teddy Jack Eddy (5) – drums
- Marty Grebb – saxophone
- Mickey Raphael – harmonica
- Ben Keith – dobro
- Dave Miner (7) – percussion
- Gary Ogan (4) – bass guitar

Technical

- Gary Ogan – production assistant
- Greg Branson – engineer
- Jim McCrary – photography

== Charts ==
Chart (1977)	Peak position
United States (Billboard 200)	142
