= Wedding Album (Leon and Mary Russell album) =

Studio album by Leon and Mary Russell
- Released: April 1976
- Recorded: Tulsa, Oklahoma; Encino, California
- Length: 35:39
- Label: Paradise
- Producers: Leon and Mary Russell, Bobby Womack

Leon Russell chronology
Will O' the Wisp (1975)	Wedding Album (1976)	Make Love to the Music (1977)

Professional ratings
Review scores
Source	Rating
AllMusic	2/5 stars

Wedding Album is a studio album by Leon Russell and his then wife, Mary Russell, otherwise known as Mary McCreary. It was the first album released on Leon Russell's record label, Paradise Records, which was distributed by Warner Bros. Records. Leon and Mary Russell are also credited as producers of the album, with the exception of the final track, "Daylight", which was produced by its writer, Bobby Womack.

Russell and Mary Russell performed "Satisfy You" on Saturday Night Live on May 15, 1976.

== Track listing ==
All songs written by Leon Russell except as indicated.

=== Side one ===
1. "Rainbow in Your Eyes" 4:08
2. "Like a Dream Come True" 2:14
3. "Love's Supposed to Be that Way" (L. & M. Russell) 3:15
4. "Fantasy" 3:58
5. "Satisfy You" 4:39

=== Side two ===
1. "You Are on My Mind" 2:42
2. "Lavender Blue (Dilly Dilly)" (Eliot Daniel, Larry Morey) 4:34
3. "Quiet Nights" (L. Russell, Julius Wechter) 3:16
4. "Windsong" 3:32
5. "Daylight" (Bobby Womack) 3:21

== Charts ==
Chart (1976)	Peak position
United States (Billboard 200)	34

== Personnel ==
- Leon Russell - lead and background vocals, synthesizer, piano, bass, RMI Electra Piano, guitar, percussion, vibes, electronic pipe organ
- Mary Russell - lead and background vocals, synthesizer, percussion, piano
- Teddy Jack Eddy (Gary Busey) drums, handclaps
- Steve Douglas - flute ensemble
- Dennis Mansfield - drums
- Richard Torrance - acoustic guitar
- Roger Linn - electric, acoustic and slide guitars
- David Miner - bass guitar
- Robert Wilson - bass guitar (on "You Are on My Mind")
- Jim Horn - saxophone
- Marty Grebb - saxophone
- Julius Wechter - marimba ensemble, piano (on "Quiet Nights")
- Gregg Thomas - bird of paradise mating call (on "Quiet Nights"), drums
- Ambrose Campbell - congas, Nigerian folklore (on "Windsong")
- Willie Weeks - bass guitar (on "Daylight")
- Nigel Olsson - drums (on "Daylight")
- Gary Rowles - guitar (on "Daylight")
- Truman Thomas - electric piano (on "Daylight")
- Bobby Womack - electric and acoustic guitars (on "Daylight")
