= On a Distant Shore =

Studio album by Leon Russell
- Released: September 22, 2017
- Recorded: 2016
- Studio: ThirtySeventeen studio in Nashville, Tennessee
- Length: 45:41
- Label: Palmetto
- Producer: Mark Lambert and Leon Russell

Leon Russell chronology
Life Journey (2014)	On a Distant Shore (2017)

On a Distant Shore is an album by singer, multi-instrumentalist and songwriter Leon Russell. Produced by Mark Lambert and Leon Russell, the album was released on September 22, 2017, Leon's 38th album on Palmetto Records. On a Distant Shore is Leon's last album, as he died in November 2016, aged 74. The album was recorded at ThirtySeventeen studio in Nashville, Tennessee in 2016. Leon Russell's daughter, Coco Bridges, performs backing vocals on the album and also did the album cover painting. Leon Russell's daughter, Sugaree Noel Bridges, performs backing vocals on the album. Russell reinterpreted "This Masquerade", "Hummingbird" and "A Song for You", three of his best-known songs, and also added an orchestral arrangement by Larry Hall.

In 2010, Sugaree Noel Bridges released her first album The American Dream on Leon Russell Records. Sugaree and CoCo are children from Leon's marriage to Janet Lee Constantine, whom he married on February 6, 1983. They had three daughters together, Sugaree Noel (born October 9, 1982), Honey (born January 19, 1986), and Coco (born April 29, 1990).

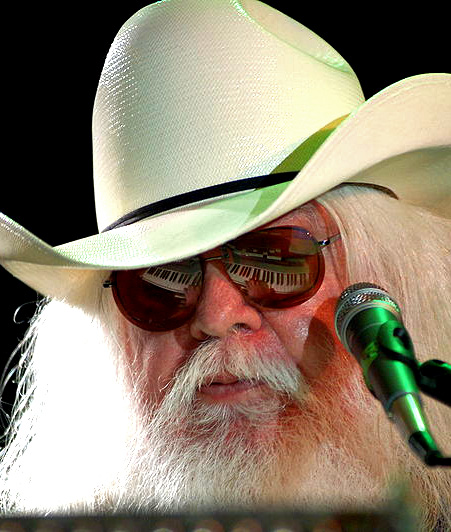
Russell in 2009

== Critical reception ==
Professional ratings
Review scores
Source	Rating
AllMusic	3/5 stars
American Songwriter	3.5/5 stars

Hal Horowitz with American Songwriter reviewed the album: "Russell wrote 13 new songs, clearly in the style of those sung by Sinatra, Mel Torme and the crooners of the '30s-'50s. Co-producer Mark Lambert then worked with arranger Larry Hall to add full orchestral backing to the songs, including harps, swelling strings, bold horns and even angelic background vocalists. This is the album he wanted to leave as his legacy. As such, it's a significant, often impressive work from one of rock and roll's true icons who has chosen a unique and, to many, surprisingly starry-eyed way to say goodbye."

== Track listing ==
All songs performed and written by Leon Russell (with Matt Harris joining Leon on track 3)

1. "On a Distant Shore" – 3:16
2. "Love This Way" – 3:50
3. "Here Without You" – 3:51
4. "This Masquerade" – 4:41
5. "Black and Blue" – 3:16
6. "Just Leaves and Grass" – 5:02
7. "On the Waterfront" – 3:31
8. "Easy to Love" – 4:07
9. "Hummingbird" – 3:10
10. "The One I Love Is Wrong" – 3:27
11. "Where Do We Go from Here" – 3:35
12. "A Song for You" – 3:35

== Personnel ==
- Leon Russell – bass, composer, keyboards, primary artist, producer, vocals
- Coco Bridges – cover painting, vocals
- Sugaree Noel Bridges – vocals
- Mike Brignardello – bass
- Ray Goren – featured artist
- Larry Hall – guitar, horn, keyboards, orchestral arrangements, strings
- Tony Harrell – keyboards
- Drew Lambert – bass
- Mark Lambert – engineer, Guitar, liner notes, mixing, producer, vocals
- Chris Leuzinger – guitar
- Greg Morrow – drums
- Russ Pahl – guitar (steel)
- Andre Reiss – guitar
- Eddie Kramer – engineer, mixing
- Shawn Davies – graphic design

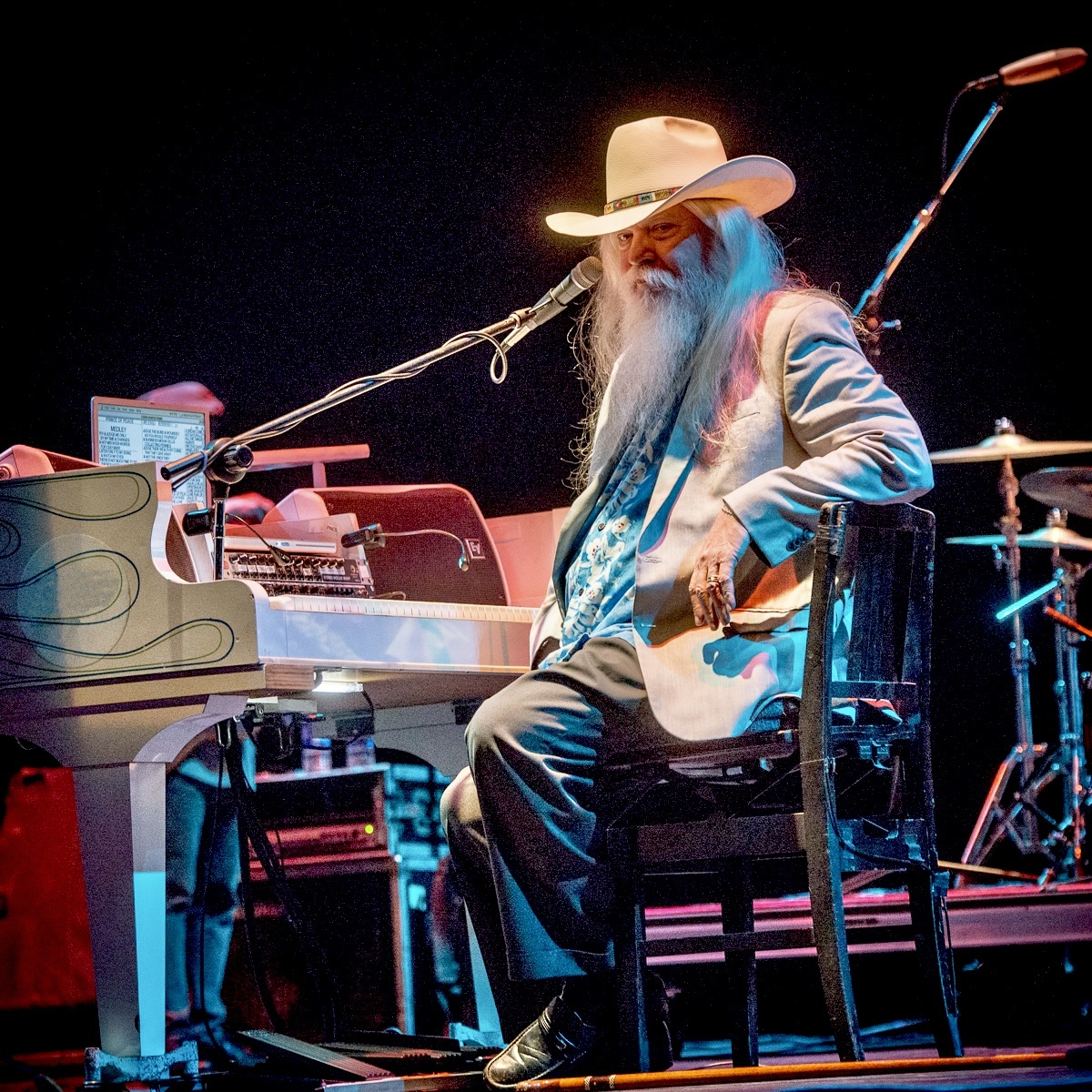
Leon Russell taking time out to tell a story in 2016
