= Solid State (Leon Russell album) =

Studio album by Leon Russell
- Released: 1984
- Recorded: 1984
- Studio: Paradise Studios
- Length: 43:26
- Label: Paradise
- Producer: Leon Russell

Leon Russell chronology
Hank Wilson, Vol. II (1984)	Solid State (1984)	Anything Can Happen (1994)

Solid State is an album by singer and songwriter Leon Russell released in 1984. It was solely produced by Russell. The album was recorded in Paradise Studios in Burbank, California. The album was re-released on CD in 2011. Most of the songs were written by Russell and Douglas A. Snider, who later write songs for Tom Jones ("From the Vaults", "Love is on the Radio", and "Don't Let Our Dreams Die Young") and B.J. Thomas ("Back Against the Wall").

The songs "Rescue My Heart", and "Good Time Charlie's Got The Blues" on this album were release as singles in 1984. Jack Wessel played bass and did backing vocals for Solid State. Wessel would continue and be in Leon's band for 35 years. Leon took the album into a US tour in 1984.

== Reception ==
People reviewed the album on November 19, 1984. The magazine wrote of the album: "There’s also a nicely mournful version of the Danny O'Keefe country standard Good Time Charlie's Got the Blues. Russell's delivery is honest and plaintive. This is an ideal LP for a slow, dreamy fall evening."

== Track listing ==
All songs written by Leon Russell and Douglas A. Snider, excluding A6 Side one

1. "The Rock 'N' Roll Part of My Heart" 2:58
2. "Lost Love" 4:57
3. "All The Love Is On The Radio" 3:55
4. "Deeper" 4:20
5. "There's No Understanding The Heart" 3:42
6. "Good Time Charlie's Got the Blues" (Danny O'Keefer) 3:19

Side two

1. "Rescue My Heart" 7:09
2. "To See You Again" 4:58
3. "A New Kind of Fire" 3:22
4. "Like a Thief in the Night" 5:05
5. "If You Go Away" 4:01

== Personnel ==
- Vocals, Guitar – Leon Russell
- Backing Vocals – Trudy Fair
- Bass guitar, Backing Vocals – Jack Wessel
- Cello – Byron Bach
- Guitar – Bob Britt
- Percussion – Ambrose Campbell (tracks: B1, B4), Shamsi Sarumi (tracks: B4)
- Saxophone – Billy Puett (tracks: A3, A6, B1, B3)
- Vibraphone – Kirby Shelstad (tracks: B3)
- Viola – Claude O'Donnell
- Violin – Alan Umstead, Byron Groner, Joann Cuthirds, Paul Tobias
- Arranged By – Bill Dekle (tracks: A4, B2, B5)
