= Life Journey =

Studio album by Leon Russell
- Released: April 1, 2014
- Recorded: 2013–2014
- Studio: Capitol (Hollywood)
- Genre: Rock, blues rock
- Length: 48:13
- Label: Universal Records
- Producer: Tommy LiPuma, Elton John

Leon Russell chronology
The Union (2010)	Life Journey (2014)	On a Distant Shore (2017)

Professional ratings
Allmusic Best of 2014
Review scores
Source	Rating
AllMusic	4/5 stars

Life Journey is an album by singer, multi-instrumentalist and songwriter Leon Russell produced by Tommy LiPuma (with Elton John credited as executive producer) released on April 1, 2014. It was recorded in 2013 and 2014. In this album, Russell renewed his songwriting after his 2010 collaboration album with John, The Union. Leon has two original songs on the album, "Big Lips" and "Down in Dixieland".

Leon Russell took this ‘Life Journey’ on tour in 2014 and 2015. Touring with him was multi-instrumentalist Beau Charron, longtime bassist Jackie Wessel and drummer Brandon Holder.

Life Journey was the last album by Russell to be released before his death in November 2016. On a Distant Shore, recorded in 2016 and released on September 22, 2017, was Leon's last album. Clayton-Hamilton Jazz Orchestra played on "Georgia On My Mind", "I Got It Bad & That Ain’t Good", and "New York State Of Mind."

== Reception ==
The album received general positive reviews. Rock critic Nick DeRiso wrote: "Nothing quite matches Russell interpreting Russell, as heard on Big Lips — which also features Chris Simmons on slide, Abe Laboriel Jr. on drums and Willie Weeks on bass." AllMusic reviewer, Stephen Thomas Erlewine, wrote about the album: "This small list suggests how Life Journey touches upon much of the music Russell has sung over the years -- it's heavy on R&B, blues, jazz, and swing, but strangely lacking in much country." AllMusic rated the Life Journey album as one of the Best of 2014.

== Track listing ==
- All songs performed by Leon Russell
  - Title – Composer – run time
1. "Come On in My Kitchen" – Robert Johnson 2:20
2. "Big Lips" – Leon Russell 3:12
3. "Georgia on My Mind" – Hoagy Carmichael and Stuart Gorrell 4:52
4. "That Lucky Old Sun" – Haven Gillespie and Beasley Smith 4:09
5. "Fever" – Eddie Cooley and John Davenport 4:19
6. "Think of Me" – Mike Reid 3:28
7. "I Got It Bad (and That Ain't Good)" – Duke Ellington and Paul Francis Webster 4:29
8. "The Masquerade Is Over" – Herb Magidson and Allie Wrubel 5:44
9. "I Really Miss You" – Paul Anka 4:12
10. "New York State of Mind" – Billy Joel 5:27
11. "Fool's Paradise" – Johnny Fuller, Bob Geddins and Dr. David Rosenbaum 2:54
12. "Down in Dixieland" – Leon Russell - 3:07

== Personnel ==
- Leon Russell - Composer, Liner Notes, Piano, Primary Artist, Vocals, Vocals (Background)
- Elton John - Executive Producer
- Tommy LiPuma - Producer
- Shari Sutcliffe - Music Contractor, Production Coordination
- Clayton-Hamilton Jazz Orchestra - Featured Artist
- George Bohanon - Trombone
- Lee Callet - Sax (Tenor)
- William Cantos - Vocals (Background)
- Gilbert Castellanos - Trumpet
- Alvin Chea - Vocals (Background)
- Jeff Clayton - Clarinet, Sax (Alto)
- John Clayton - Arranger, Bass, Conductor
- Sal Cracchiolo - Trumpet
- Graham Dechter - Guitar (Acoustic)
- Dixieland Band - Featured Artist
- Keith Fiddmont - Sax (Alto)
- James Ford - Trumpet
- Robben Ford - Guitar
- Larry Goldings - Hammond B3
- James Gordon - Clarinet
- Jeff Hamilton - Drums
- Clay Jenkins - Trumpet
- Abe Laboriel Jr. - Drums
- Greg Leisz - Pedal Steel, Pedal Steel Guitar
- Darrell Leonard - Flugelhorn, Trumpet
- Christoph Luty - Bass
- Hugh McCracken - Guitar, Soloist
- Perry Morgan - Vocals (Background)
- Ira Nepus - Trombone
- Charles Owens - Sax (Tenor)
- Ryan Porter - Trombone
- Louis Price - Vocals (Background)
- Chris Simmons - Slide Guitar
- Maurice Spears - Trombone (Bass)
- Bijon Watson - Trumpet
- Willie Weeks - Bass
- Anthony Wilson - Guitar
- Rickey Woodard - Sax (Tenor)
- Elena Barere - Concert Master
- Alan Broadbent - String Arrangements
- Jill Dell'Abate - String Contractor
- Chandler Harrod - Engineer, Pro-Tools
- Mark Lambert - Piano Engineer, Vocal Engineer
- Ryan Roth - Design, Photography
- Doug Saks - Mastering
- Elliot Scheiner - String Engineer
- Al Schmitt - Engineer, Mixing
- Mike Diehl - Design
