= A Mighty Flood =

Studio album by Leon Russell
- Released: 2008
- Recorded: 2008
- Genre: Gospel; rock
- Length: 42:00
- Label: Leon Russell Records

Leon Russell chronology
In Your Dreams (2008)	A Mighty Flood (2008)	The Union (2010)

A Mighty Flood is an album by singer, multi-instrumentalist and songwriter Leon Russell. Billboard magazine on October 2, 2010, called a A Mighty Flood "a recent treat" and a "buoyant 2008 gospel album". The album was produced by Russell and released in 2008 by Leon Russell Records. After A Mighty Flood Leon's next album was his 2010 collaboration album with Elton John, The Union.

== Track listing ==
All songs written and performed by Leon Russell:

1. "A Mighty Flood" – 3:11
2. "I See the Light" – 3:28
3. "Golden Wings" – 3:53
4. "Inside the Angels" – 4:05
5. "Jesus Is Watching" – 4:33
6. "Judge Not" – 3:40
7. "The Road to Jerico" – 3:40
8. "Say Yes to Jesus" – 2:25
9. "Slow Train" – 3:34
10. "When Jesus Comes" – 2:48
11. "Unforgiven" – 4:48
