= Bad Country (album) =

Studio album by Leon Russell
- Released: 2008
- Recorded: 2003
- Genre: Rock; country
- Length: 29:29
- Label: Leon Russell Records

Leon Russell chronology
Angel in Disguise (2006)	Bad Country (2008)	Almost Piano (2008)

Professional ratings
Review scores
Source	Rating
AllMusic	3/5 stars

Bad Country is an album by singer, multi-instrumentalist and songwriter Leon Russell. The album was recorded in 2003 and released in 2008 by Leon Russell Records. It was by produced with all new songs written and performed by Leon.

Rachel Leibrock with Sacramento News & Review, newsreview.com, reviewed Bad Country on Nov. 11, 2009, writing: "2008's Bad Country, a collection of honky-tonk-influenced tracks on which the 67-year-old musician plays with the skill of a veteran but with the enthusiasm of that energetic teen who first discovered the power of live music."

== Track listing ==
1. "A Little Bit of Love" – 2:12
2. "Honkytonk Dream" – 2:12
3. "Oklahoma Girl" – 3:18
4. "California Dreams" – 2:59
5. "Hungry Eyes" – 2:25
6. "Real Love" – 2:47
7. "Rio Grande" – 3:01
8. "Sweet Magic Love" – 3:01
9. "Tennessee Hayride" – 0:59
10. "Come Lay with Me" – 3:00
11. "Bad Country" – 3:35
