= Hank Wilson, Vol. II =

Hank Wilson Vol. II

Studio album by Hank Wilson
- Released: 1982 and new in 1984
- Recorded: Paradise Studios
- Studio: Paradise Studios, Burbank, CA
- Genre: Neotraditional country
- Length: 33:10
- Label: Paradise Records
- Producer: Leon Russell

Hank Wilson chronology
The Live Album (Leon Russell and New Grass Revival) (1981)	Hank Wilson Vol. II (1982)	Solid State (1984)

Hank Wilson Vol. II, 1982 album cover

Hank Wilson Vol. II, 2001 album cover

Professional ratings
Review scores
Source	Rating
AllMusic	3/5 stars

Hank Wilson Vol. II is an album by singer and songwriter Leon Russell singing as Hank Wilson. The album was recorded in 1981 at Russell's Paradise Studios in Burbank, California. The album was produced by Russell.

There were two vinyl LP released of this album, Hank Wilson Vol. II, one in 1982 and one in 1984. The 1982 cover's original art, a self portrait of Leon Russell, is located at Russel's former recording studio The Church Studio. The two Hank Wilson Vol. II vinyl LP albums have different track listings and different cover photos. The 1982 version has artwork of Russell with eyes closed and a microphone to his lips. The 1984 cover has him standing with his guitar. Hank Wilson Vol. II was re-released on CD on October 23, 2001. The 1982 release was sold in limited quality at Russell's live shows.

== Background ==
Russell was born in Oklahoma, had a home in Tulsa, and grew up around country and blues music. After making successful rock albums, touring, and releasing the concert album Leon Live, he returned to his roots under the name of a fictional musical personality: Hank Wilson. The first Hank Wilson album called Hank Wilson's Back Vol. I was made by Russell and some of his close friends from both Los Angeles and Nashville, and recorded the honky tonk songs between February 26 and February 28, 1973.

- Russell made a total of four Hank Wilson albums:
  - Hank Wilson's Back Vol. I (1973)
  - Hank Wilson, Vol. II (1984)
  - Legend in My Time: Hank Wilson Vol. III (1998)
  - Rhythm & Bluegrass: Hank Wilson, Vol. 4 (2001)
    - In 2009, Russell released the album Best of Hank Wilson

== Track listing 1982 ==
All songs performed by Russell, excluding A1. All tracks composed by artist listed.

- A1 Wabash Cannonball : Vocals – Willie Nelson and Leon Russell 2:43
- A2 Oh Lonesome Me : Written-By – Don Gibson 2:32
- A3 Tennessee Waltz : Lyrics by Redd Stewart and music by Pee Wee King 2:30
- A4 "Heartaches by the Number" : Written-By – Harlan Howard 2:44
- A5 If You've Got The Money Honey, I've Got The Time : Written-By – Jim Beck, Lefty Frizzell 2:19
- A6 Tumbling Tumbleweeds : Written-By – Bob Nolan 3:30
- B1 I'm Movin On : Written-By – Clarence E. Snow 2:26
- B2 Waltz Across Texas : Written-By – Talmadge Tubb 2:55
- B3 Don't Let The Stars Get In Your Eyes : Written-By – Slim Willet 2:45
- B4 On The Wings Of A Dove : Written-By – Bob Ferguson 3:02
- B5 I'll Be There : Written-By – Ray Price and Rusty Gabbard 2:52
- B6 I Saw The Light : Written-By – Hank Williams 2:21

== Track listing 1984 release and 2001 CD ==
All songs performed by Russell. All tracks composed by artist listed.

- A1 Oh Lonesome Me : Written-By – Don Gibson 2:27
- A2 Tennessee Waltz : Lyrics by Redd Stewart and music by Pee Wee King 2:43
- A3 Heartaches By The Number : Written-By – Harlan Howard 2:21
- A4 My Cricket Written By – Leon Russell 3:03
- A5 If You've Got The Money Honey, I've Got The Time: Written-By – Jim Beck, Lefty Frizzell 2:15
- A6 Tumbling Tumbleweeds : Written-By – Bob Nolan 3:30
- B1 I'm Movin On : Written-By – Clarence E. Snow 2:22
- B2 Waltz Across Texas : Written-By – Talmadge Tubb 2:55
- B3 Don't Let The Stars Get In Your Eyes : Written-By – Slim Willet 2:43
- B4 On The Wings Of A Dove : Written-By – Bob Ferguson 3:03
- B5 I'll Be There Written-By : Ray Price and Rusty Gabbard 2:50
- B6 I Saw The Light : Written-By – Hank Williams 2:21

== Personnel ==
- Leon Russell – Bass, Guitar, Keyboards, Piano, Producer, Vocals
- Willie Nelson – Vocals on "Wabash Cannonball"
- The Band: Trudy Fair, John "Juke" Logan, Billy West, Bob Britt, Jack Wessel, Shamsi Sarumi and Ambrose Campbell
- Artwork By – Robert Jones Designs
- Photography By – Myrell Gilliam
