= Face in the Crowd =

Studio album by Leon Russell
- Released: 1999
- Recorded: 1998
- Genre: Blues rock
- Length: 45:20

Leon Russell chronology
| Legend in My Time: Hank Wilson Vol. III (1998) | Face in the Crowd (1999) | Blues: Same Old Song (1999) |

Professional ratings
Review scores
| Source | Rating |
|---|---|
| AllMusic | 3/5 stars |

Face in the Crowd is an album by singer and songwriter Leon Russell. The album was first released as a CD on January 26, 1999. Album was by produced by Leon Russell and released by Sagestone Entertainment Records. Most of the songs were written by Russell, with two songs co-written by Jack Wessel. In Face in the Crowd, Russell returns to the style he is known for his unique Tulsa sound. Jack Wessel, a bass player, was a long time Leon Russell band member, starting in 1981.

On May 19, 1999 Leon promoted his album Face in the Crowd on The David Letterman Show live.

== Track listing ==
All tracks composed by Leon Russell, except as noted.

1. "Love Is a Battlefield" – 2:58
2. "Dr. Love" (Leon Russell, Jack Wessel) – 4:25
3. "Down in the Flood" – 4:07
4. "So Hard to Say Goodbye" – 2:36
5. "Betty Ann" – 4:19
6. "This Heart of Mine" – 3:37
7. "Message from My Baby" – 3:41
8. "Blue Eyes and a Black Heart" – 4:06
9. "What Will I Do Without You" – 4:41
10. "Mean and Evil" – 2:52
11. "The Devil Started Talking" – 4:17
12. "Don't Bring the Blues to Bed" (Russell, Wessel) – 3:51

== Personnel ==
- Leon Russell
- The Band: Jackie Wessel, Bass; Brandon Holder, Drums; and Beau Charron, Keyboards, Lap Steel Guitar, and Mandolin.
