= Live at Gilley's =

Live album by Leon Russell
- Released: 2000
- Recorded: 1981
- Venue: Gilley's Club
- Genre: Folk rock
- Length: 37:20
- Producer: Leon Russell

Leon Russell chronology
Blues: Same Old Song (1999)	Live at Gilley's (2000)	Guitar Blues (2001)

Live at Gilley's, cover used by Q Records/Atlantic Records

Professional ratings
Review scores
Source	Rating
Allmusic	3/5 stars

Live at Gilley's is a live album by singer and songwriter Leon Russell. The album was recorded on September 17, 1981, at Gilley's Club in Pasadena, Texas. The recording was first released on April 25, 2000. The second release was in 2019 by Leon Russell Records with Varèse Sarabande.

== Track listing ==
1. "Mystery Train" (Junior Parker, Sam Phillips) – 2:46
2. "One More Love Song" (Leon Russell) – 4:23
3. "Truck Drivin' Man" (Terry Fell) – 1:51
4. "Cajun Love Song" (Eddie Miller, Russell) – 3:05
5. "My Cricket" (Russell) – 2:39
6. "I'm Movin' On" (Hank Snow) – 2:13
7. "Lady Blue" (Russell) – 3:23
8. "In the Pines" (Huddie Ledbetter, Alan Riggs, Russell) – 3:29
9. "A Song for You" (Russell) – 3:54
10. "Uncle Pen" (Bill Monroe) – 2:10
11. "Prince of Peace" (Greg Dempsey, Russell) – 4:40
12. "Rollin' in My Sweet Baby's Arms" (Lester Flat) – 2:59

== Personnel ==
- Leon Russell – vocals
- Elise Brown – Project Manager
- Teddy Jack – Engineer, Mixing
- Alan Rubens – Producer
- Janine Silvers – Production Coordination
