= Leon Russell =

American singer-songwriter (1942–2016)

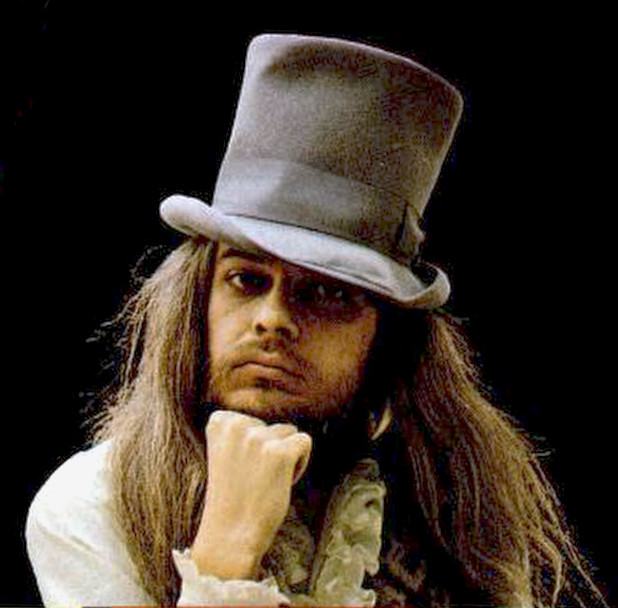
- Russell in an ad in Billboard, February 1970
- Born: Claude Russell Bridges; April 2, 1942; Lawton, Oklahoma, U.S.
- Died: November 13, 2016 (aged 74); Mt. Juliet, Tennessee, U.S.
- Burial place: Memorial Park Cemetery; Tulsa, Oklahoma, U.S.
- Other names: Hank Wilson, Russell Bridges, C. J. Russell, Lew Russell
- Occupations: Musician; arranger; conductor; record producer; record executive; singer-songwriter
- Years active: 1956–2016
- Spouses: Mary McCreary (m. 1975; div. 1980) Janet Lee Constantine (m. 1983)
- Children: 6
- Musical career
- Genres: Rock; country; gospel; R&B
- Instruments: Keyboards; vocals; bass guitar; guitar; baritone horn
- Labels: Viva; Olympic Records; Perspective Sound; Robbins; Capitol; Shelter; Paradise; Leon Russell Records; Virgin Records; Warner Bros.
- Website: leonrussell.com

Leon Russell (born Claude Russell Bridges; April 2, 1942 – November 13, 2016) was an American musician and songwriter who was involved with numerous bestselling records during his 60-year career that spanned multiple genres, including rock and roll, country, gospel, bluegrass, rhythm and blues, southern rock, blues rock, folk, surf and the Tulsa sound. His recordings earned six gold records and he received two Grammy Awards from seven nominations. In 1973 Billboard named Russell the "Top Concert Attraction in the World". In 2011, he was inducted into both the Rock and Roll Hall of Fame and the Songwriters Hall of Fame.

Russell collaborated with many notable artists and recorded 33 albums and 430 songs. He wrote "Delta Lady," recorded by Joe Cocker, and organized and performed with Cocker's Mad Dogs & Englishmen tour in 1970. His "A Song for You," which was named to the Grammy Hall of Fame in 2018, has been recorded by more than 200 artists, and his song "This Masquerade" by more than 75.

As a session pianist with The Wrecking Crew, Russell played in his early years on albums by the Beach Boys, the Ventures, Dick Dale, and Jan and Dean. On his first album, Leon Russell, in 1970, the musicians included Eric Clapton, Ringo Starr, and George Harrison. One of his early fans, Elton John, said that Russell was a "mentor" and an "inspiration". They recorded their album The Union in 2010, earning them a Grammy nomination.

Russell produced and played in recording sessions for Bob Dylan, Frank Sinatra, Ike & Tina Turner, the Rolling Stones, and many other artists. He wrote and recorded the hits "Tight Rope" and "Lady Blue". He performed at The Concert for Bangladesh in 1971, along with Harrison, Dylan, and Clapton; for this, he earned a Grammy Award.

== Early life and education ==
Russell was born on April 2, 1942, the second of John Griffith and Hester Evel (née Whaley) Bridges' two sons at Southwestern Hospital in Lawton, Oklahoma. Russell's mother said that he started talking later than most children. She said while he was "watching the birds, and something was going on with the birds," his first words were "What's the matter, little birdie — you cry?" His mother said she was "shocked, because he never spoke".

Russell said he "was born with 'spastic paralysis,' now called cerebral palsy". An injury at birth damaged his second and third vertebrae, causing a slight paralysis in the right side of his body, most notably affecting three fingers on his right hand which caused Russell to favor his left hand and develop his signature left-hand-dominant piano playing style. He said "My chops have always been sort of weak.... I have damaged nerve endings on the right side, so my piano style comes from designing stuff I can play with my right hand." He said that the condition helped him become "very aware of the duality involved in our plane of existence here". He also had a limp caused by the same condition that was once thought to be due to polio. Russell said, "I felt like the world had cheated me big time" but added, "If I hadn't had the problem, I probably wouldn't have gotten into music at all and would have been an ex-football player, selling insurance in Des Moines."

Both of Russell's parents played upright piano, and when he was four years old his mother heard him picking out the melody to "Trust and Obey," a hymn he had heard at church. He then began piano lessons in Anadarko, Oklahoma, a 38-mile (61 km) trip each way. While still taking piano lessons, Russell learned the alto saxophone and cornet in his elementary school band. He then learned to play the baritone horn. After impressing the high school band director in Maysville, Russell was invited to join the high school marching band while in the fifth grade. Russell said he learned to fake a classical piano style, saying "I studied classical music for a long time, maybe ten years, and I realized, finally, I was never going to have the hands to play that stuff. It was too complicated. I invented ways to play in a classical style that was not the real deal."

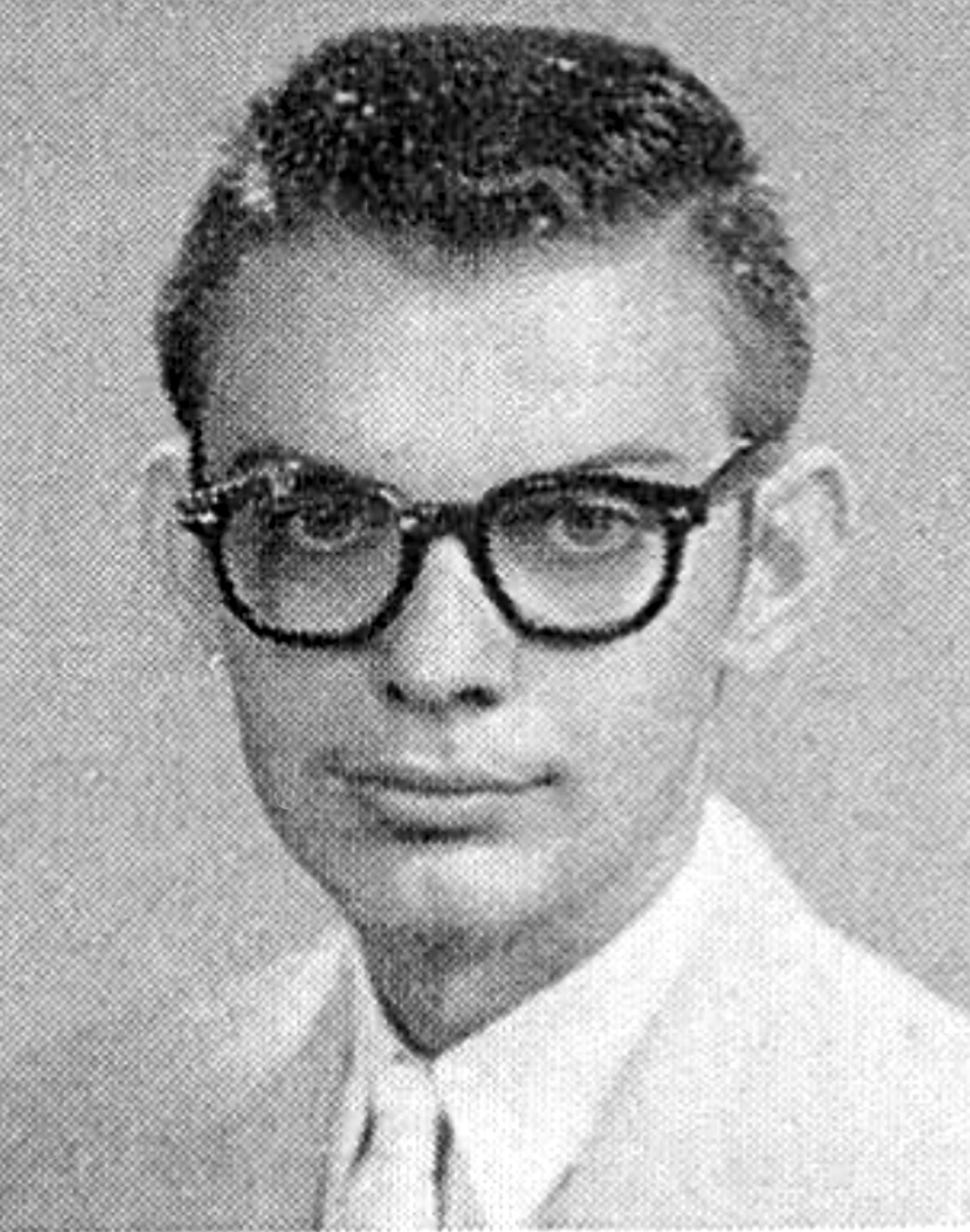
Claude Russell Bridges, 1958 yearbook photo, Will Rogers High School

=== High school ===
Russell attended Will Rogers High School in Tulsa, Oklahoma. His classmates included Elvin Bishop, Gailard Sartain, Anita Bryant, and David Gates. Russell's first record appearance was in 1957 age 15 years old, when he played piano on "Jo-Baby," a song written by 16-year-old Gates. Originally attributed to "the Accents," it was released on the Tulsa-based Perspective Sound label and then re-released a year later and distributed nationally by Marty Robbins on his Robbins Records record label under the band name "David Gates & the Accents". Russell collaborated later with Gates after high school in the band the Fencemen. Russell credited his awareness of the precursors of American soul music to a homemade AM crystal radio. He was offered a chance to tour with Jerry Lee Lewis after graduating. Explaining his decision to not attend college, Russell said, "I figured this was my chance to eat in a lot of restaurants and travel around, play some rock and roll music, which I decided was easier and better."

Performing while underage in clubs and bars, Russell assumed the name "Leon Russell" from a fake ID he used to enter clubs even though he was a high school student. At the time, Oklahoma was a "dry" state, so teenagers were able to perform in clubs that ordinarily would have only been open to those over 21 years of age.

Although still in high school, Russell performed at area supper clubs, bars and nightclubs with his group "the Starlighters" (Russell, J.J. Cale, Leo Feathers, Johnny Williams, and Chuck Blackwell). Blackwell said that Russell was "especially good at playing Erroll Garner-style jazz during dinner, but then, after everybody got through eating, he'd break into Jerry Lee Lewis". Russell also backed groups in Tulsa including Ronnie Hawkins and the Hawks, often until early morning, after having worked through the night. Russell said "I worked six or seven nights a week till I left Tulsa at 17. I'd work 6 to 11 (pm) at a beer joint, then 1 to 5 (am) at an after-hours club. It was a hard schedule to do when going to school. I slept in English a lot."

=== Los Angeles ===
Russell said "I got out to California, and they were more serious about their liquor laws. I about starved to death because it was so much harder to find work at my age." Settling in Los Angeles, he studied guitar with James Burton.

Russell was primarily a session musician in his early career. During session work he played for and with artists as varied as Jan and Dean, Ricky Nelson, Gary Lewis & the Playboys, George Harrison, Delaney Bramlett, Freddy Cannon, Ringo Starr, Doris Day, Elton John, Ray Charles, Eric Clapton, the Byrds, Barbra Streisand, the Beach Boys, the Ventures, Willie Nelson, Badfinger, the Tijuana Brass, Frank Sinatra, the Band, Bob Dylan, J. J. Cale, B.B. King, Dave Mason, Glen Campbell, Lynn Anderson, Joe Cocker, the Rolling Stones, and the Flying Burrito Brothers.

As Russell developed his solo artist career, he crossed genres to include rock and roll, blues, bluegrass, and gospel music.

== 1960s - Session musician, solo artist, and record executive ==
In Los Angeles, Russell played as a studio musician for many of the popular artists of the 1960s, including the Byrds, Gary Lewis & the Playboys, Bobby Pickett, and Herb Alpert. He played piano on Phil Spector productions including recordings by the Ronettes, the Crystals, and Darlene Love and in the 1963 A Christmas Gift for You from Phil Spector album.

Alpert said of Russell, "Leon was on several sessions that I produced with the Tijuana Brass. He was always dressed in a suit and tie, with short hair and no beard! This was soon after he arrived in Los Angeles from Oklahoma. We would go through the same routine each time I started rehearsing the music. He would sit at the piano and he would always say, 'I don’t know what to play'. And I would say, 'Just wait and see if you feel something, and if you don’t it’s okay. I just like your energy at the sessions.' Well, he would always chime in with something special and affect the groove in a very Leon Russell way that was always unique. Leon was a wonderful musician and had a major effect on all of my recordings. His touch can be heard on many Tijuana Brass records, including 'Whipped Cream' and 'A Taste of Honey.' To top it off, Leon was a true gentleman with a special talent and he was a person that I had a great feeling for." In 1962 Russell played piano on Walter Brennan's LP Old Rivers, produced by Snuff Garrett. Garrett said "I could talk style with him (Russell) and he'd do it. I'd name a record. I'd go, 'I like the piano on this...' and he'd go, 'Okay', and do the piano part.... I fell in love with his playing."

Credited as Russell Bridges, he contributed to the Canadian Sweethearts' (Bob Regan and Lucille Starr) first A&M Records recording session with Dorsey Burnette in 1963. The LP Introducing The Canadian Sweethearts was released in 1964. Glen Campbell's 1967 album Gentle on My Mind credited him as Russell Bridges on piano.

=== Early media appearances ===
In 1962 a 20-year-old Russell appeared on Los Angeles TV station KCOP leading the Leon Russell Trio on the rock 'n' roll show Stepping Out. Airing at 11:00 at night, the live broadcast often aired multiple times per week. He was in the 1964 concert film T.A.M.I. Show playing piano with the Wrecking Crew sporting short, dark, slicked-back hair, in contrast to his later look.

=== Early recordings ===
In 1962 a 20-year-old Russell once again collaborated with David Gates, releasing the 45 rpm single "Sad September / Tryin’ To Be Someone" which featured session guitarist James Burton. Credited to David & Lee and later to Dave & Lee, the record was produced by Gary Paxton and first released on Paxton's G.S.P. Records label.

=== Composer ===
In the mid-1960s, he wrote or co-wrote songs, including two hits for Gary Lewis and the Playboys: "Everybody Loves a Clown" (which reached the Billboard Top 40 on October 9, 1965, remaining on the chart for eight weeks and reaching number 4) and "She's Just My Style" (which entered the Billboard Top 40 on December 18, 1965, and rose to number 3).

=== Hired by Snuff Garrett ===
Russell was hired by Snuff Garrett and together they formed a production company, Snuff Garrett Productions in 1964. Russell was a production assistant, arranger and creative developer for the company. Russell played on many number-one singles, including "This Diamond Ring" by Gary Lewis & the Playboys. Russell also acted as Garrett's arranger and conductor of the Midnight String Quartet's debut album Rhapsodies For Young Lovers. The album was planned as a solo Leon Russell LP, but was instead marketed as a Midnight String Quartet production.

Russell and Al Capps arranged Brian Hyland's 1966 single "The Joker Went Wild," written by Bobby Russell (no relation to Leon). Russell also played xylophone and bells on the record. Jason Ankeny of AllMusic said "Russell's evocative arrangements lend 'The Joker Went Wild' much of its appeal, however, channeling the lessons of Phil Spector and Brian Wilson to create rich, bold pop far greater than the sum of its parts." The track reached No. 20 on the Billboard Hot 100.

Two years later, Garrett and Russell started Viva Records. Russell was the record label's initial A&R representative as well as producer for many of the label's recordings, including the Shindogs' 1966 "Who Do You Think You Are / Yes, I’m Going Home" (Viva V-601). Viva Records also had a number of music publishing divisions. In 1969, it was reported Russell had been the vice-president of Viva.

Russell said the music he created while collaborating with Garrett motivated him to leave. "That wasn't my cup of tea...it wasn't the kind of thing I liked. I was anxious to not do that very much anymore, it just seemed too fluffy."

=== The Shindogs ===
Russell was an arranger and songwriter as well as a piano and guitar player in the Shindogs, the house band on the ABC-TV dance show series Shindig! Fellow musicians Glen Campbell, Delaney Bramlett, and Billy Preston were among the Shindogs' alumni.

=== Released first solo record ===
Russell released his first solo record, the single "Everybody's Talking 'Bout the Young," for Dot Records in 1965. Produced by Russell and Snuff Garrett, the folk-rock, anti-Vietnam war protest song was co-written by Russell, T. Lesslie (Snuff Garrett) and J. J. Cale.

=== Skyhill Studios ===
In 1965 Russell built his first recording studio, Skyhill Studios inside his 2,900 sq. ft., 4 bedroom home at 7709 Skyhill Drive in the Hollywood Hills. Russell had seen and worked in similar home recording studios owned by Les Paul, Ernie Kovacs and others. He hired fellow Tulsan J.J. Cale as his in-home studio manager. Cale said "the neighbors thought the Hell’s Angels lived at Skyhill because of all the cars, motorcycles, and loud music at all hours of the day and night." Russell and his friends referred to the studio as "the home for unwed musicians".

Russell's recording studio home featured sound proofing, double walls and extensive wiring. Different rooms throughout the house were used to record various instruments, with a bathroom dedicated for use as an echo-chamber. The first recording session in the studio was an August 1965 Glen Campbell session. Russell's Skyhill Studios was often used by up-and-coming artists to record demos to attract recording companies' attention.

=== Hired by Lenny Waronker ===
Russell was hired as an arranger and producer in 1967 by Lenny Waronker, then a junior A&R representative for the Reprise and Warner Bros. record labels. Russell's early work for Waronker included arranging and producing Harpers Bizarre's 1967 debut album Feelin' Groovy which featured a cover of "The 59th Street Bridge Song (Feelin' Groovy)". Russell also played piano on the track.

Russell also co-produced and arranged recordings by Canadian folk-rock singer Tom Northcott, including a cover version of Donovan's "Sunny Goodge Street".

=== The Asylum Choir ===
In 1968 Russell formed The Asylum Choir, a two-man group with Marc Benno. Benno, a Texan, sang and played guitar and bass. Russell sang and played guitar, piano, and drums. The duo had met in LA. Their twenty-six minute long LP Look Inside the Asylum Choir was released on Smash Records.

=== Shelter Records ===
Russell and music producer Denny Cordell established Shelter Records in 1969. The company operated from 1969 to 1981, with offices in Los Angeles and Tulsa. Shelter Records released "Duppy Conqueror," reggae artist Bob Marley's first American single.

In 1972, DC Comics sued the record label for copyright infringement. The Shelter Records logo included an upside down version of the well-known Superman logo. Shelter Records obscured the logo with an overstamped black rectangle in response to the lawsuit and later settlement. Later versions of the logo replaced the Superman artwork with a scrawled letter "S" inside an outline of an egg.

=== Delaney & Bonnie ===
Russell performed as a member of Delaney & Bonnie and Friends in 1969 and 1970, playing guitar and keyboards on their albums and as part of the touring band. Through this group, he met George Harrison and others with whom he would work over the next couple of years. With Bonnie Bramlett, Russell co-wrote "Superstar," which was originally released as a Delaney & Bonnie B-side in 1969 under the title "Groupie (Superstar)". "Superstar" would be recorded by many others, including by Rita Coolidge for Joe Cocker's 1970 Mad Dogs & Englishmen concert album, and by The Carpenters for a 1971 single that peaked at No. 2 on the Billboard Hot 100 chart.

=== Joe Cocker! LP ===
Russell was the co-producer, arranger, a songwriter and performer on Joe Cocker's 1969 LP Joe Cocker! Russell wrote the song "Delta Lady" on the album. The album reached number 11 on the Billboard 200.

== 1970s - "Superstar" status ==
=== Mad Dogs & Englishmen tour and album ===
In March 1970 Russell was hired by Joe Cocker to help quickly mount a concert band and rehearse a 48 date tour. Cocker said he had been told by United States immigration authorities he had to perform "right away" or lose his visa and be deported from the United States. Rita Coolidge claimed the real reason was due to threats that Cocker would be physically harmed if he did not comply with demands to tour.

Russell had only a week to locate, audition, hire and rehearse a ten-piece band and the Space Choir which would consist of ten backup singers. Russell said Cocker, reportedly using copious illicit drugs at the time, "was pretty wrecked when we started out". Asking Cocker "Does it sound good to you?" during an audition, Cocker said, "It never sounds right to me." I didn't know how to take that. So I said, 'Shit, I'll just do whatever I want.'" Russell hired many of the musicians from Delaney and Bonnie Bramlett's band. He both conducted and performed in the tour, playing either piano or lead guitar. Singer and former Ikette Claudia Lennear, who performed during the tour, said Russell had the unique musical talent of being able to fuse together "White gospel and Black gospel",

After watching the Mad Dogs & Englishmen concert film, Elton John said of Russell, "There are some people who are born to be leaders of musicians and he is. It was Leon I was watching. He had the feel for that music. Joe was an amazing singer. But you could tell it was Leon's band."

Russell purchased the top hat and Holy Trinity basketball jersey shirt he wore on the tour at a used clothing store near his Skyhill Studios in Los Angeles. He explained "I’m an actor - I was just trying to make a show."

=== Leon Russell (solo album) ===
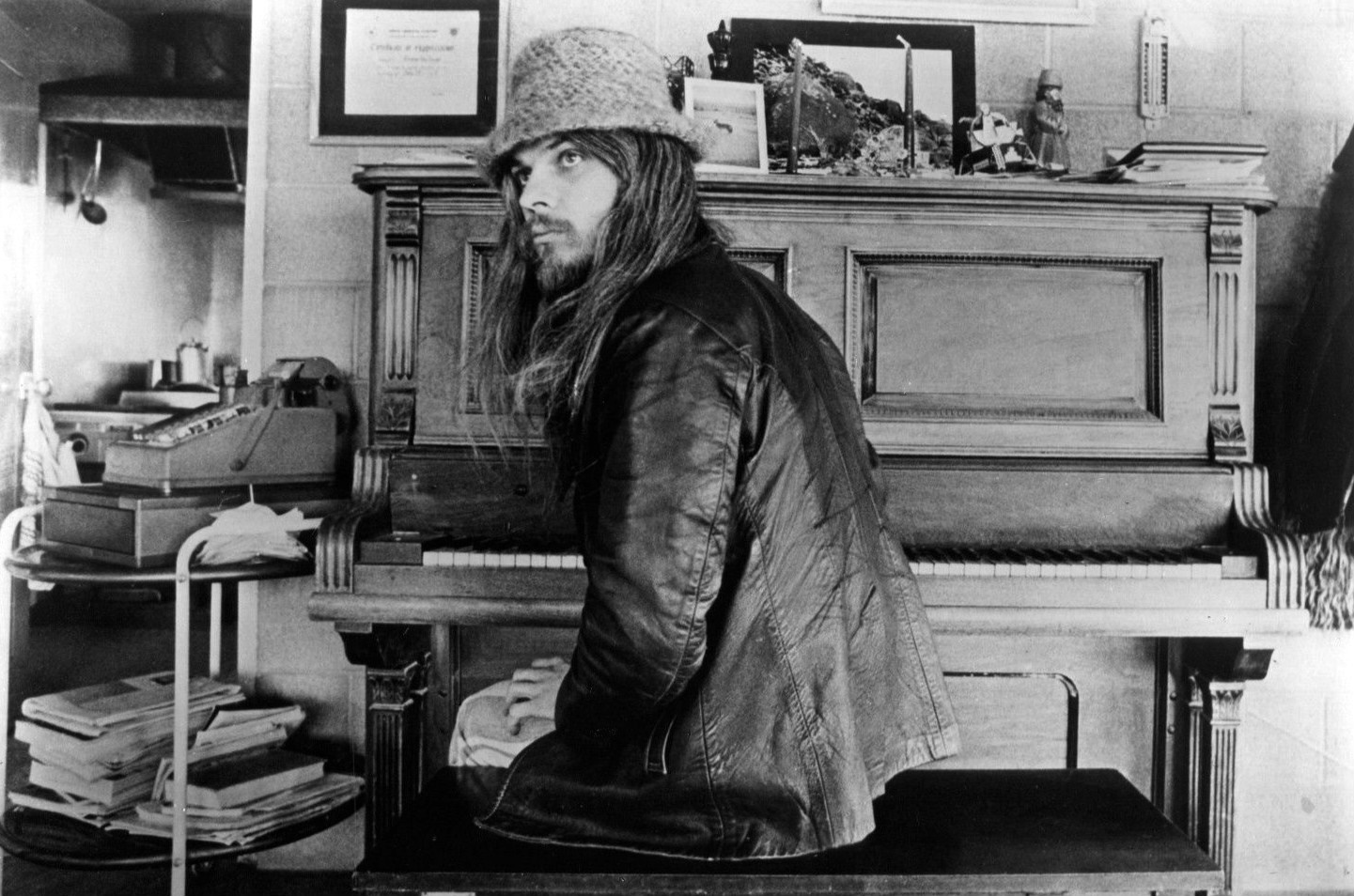
Leon Russell at home in his studio, October 1970; he became a solo recording artist that year

Russell released his 1970 solo album, Leon Russell on his Shelter Records label during the Mad Dogs & Englishmen tour. The album, recorded at Sunset Sound Recorders in Los Angeles featured a number of guest vocalists and musicians, including Marc Benno, Bonnie Bramlett, Eric Clapton, Merry Clayton, Joe Cocker, Greg Dempsey, George Harrison, Mick Jagger, Keith Richards, Chris Stainton, and Ringo Starr. The album included two Russell compositions that have become best-selling standards, "A Song for You" and "Delta Lady".

=== "A Song For You" ===
Russell explained how he wrote "A Song for You," saying "I was in my studio in Hollywood and actually I was trying to write a standard. I was trying to write a blues song that Frank Sinatra and Ray Charles both could sing.... I wrote it in 10 minutes. It was for a specific occasion. And I went in there and wrote it very quickly...that happens sometimes. Sometimes they're very quick. It's almost as if one is not writing them, you know? Like they're coming from another place."

"A Song for You" has become one of Russell's best-known songs, with versions released by more than 40 different artists, including Elkie Brooks, The Carpenters, Ray Charles, Billy Eckstine, Donny Hathaway, Peggy Lee, Carmen McRae, Willie Nelson, Freda Payne, Helen Reddy, and The Temptations. Both the Carpenters and The Temptations named an album after the song. Ray Charles' version earned him the 1994 Grammy Award for Best Male R&B Vocal Performance. "A Song For You" was inducted into Grammy Hall Of Fame in 2018.

=== "Delta Lady" ===
Russell's "Delta Lady" was first performed by Joe Cocker, released in 1969 on Joe Cocker! and in 1970 on Mad Dogs & Englishmen. Cocker's version changes Russell's original lyric from "I'm over here in England" to "when I'm home again in England" as Cocker was British. Bobbie Gentry performed the song under the title "Delta Man" on her 1970 album Fancy.

=== 1970s recordings and concerts ===
In 1970, Russell played piano on Dave Mason's album Alone Together, notably on the song "Sad and Deep as You". The song "The Letter" performed by Joe Cocker with Leon Russell & the Shelter People peaked at No. 7 on the Hot 100 on May 30, 1970; this was Russell's first hit song.

In November 1970, Russell performed at the Fillmore East, with Elton John on the same bill. Those performances have been bootlegged. Russell and John appeared on The David Frost Show with Fillmore owner Bill Graham on December 3, 1970. Russell's album Prince of Peace: Radio Broadcast 1970 is a soundboard recording of a concert at Fillmore East in late 1970. Leon Russell and Friends recorded the Homewood Sessions, broadcast as an "unscripted and unrehearsed" one-hour TV special on KCET (Los Angeles) that aired in December 1970 and was later re-broadcast several times on PBS.

Also in December 1970, Rolling Stone magazine carried an interview with Russell. It opened with a characterization of his sound as "those driving, lurchy, churchy rock and roll songs". Russell produced some tracks for Bob Dylan in March 1971 when Dylan was experimenting with his new sound. The sessions produced the single "Watching the River Flow" and "When I Paint My Masterpiece," both of which prominently featured Russell's gospel-flavored piano.

At the invitation of George Harrison, Russell played piano on Badfinger's third album, Straight Up in the summer of 1971. Russell performed piano, vocals, bass and backing vocals at the two shows of the war-refugees' benefit (Concert for Bangladesh) on August 1, 1971. He was featured performing a medley of the songs "Jumpin' Jack Flash" and "Young Blood" and singing a verse on Harrison's "Beware of Darkness". Bob Dylan surprised Russell by asking him to play bass for some of Dylan's portion of the concert; Russell and Harrison sang harmonies on the chorus of "Just Like a Woman". The Concert for Bangladesh benefit album released in late 1971 was a major critical and commercial success. The release topped album charts in several countries, and went on to win the Grammy Award for Album of the Year in March 1973. The concert also became a concert benefit film directed by Saul Swimmer and released in the spring of 1972.

In 1971, Shelter Records released Leon Russell and the Shelter People and Asylum Choir II (co-produced by Marc Benno) and recorded at Russell's Skyhill Studios. Leon Russell and the Shelter People went on to be Russell's first U.S. gold album. In the same year, Russell played on recording sessions with B. B. King, Eric Clapton, and Bob Dylan.

Russell helped the blues guitarist Freddie King revive his career by collaborating on three of King's albums for Shelter Records during the early 1970s. During those same years, Russell profited from what was then called the "country and western" market by recording and performing under the moniker Hank Wilson, and was a regular performer at Gilley's Club, a honkytonk in Pasadena, Texas, made famous by the film Urban Cowboy.

Russell recorded the song "Get a Line on You" at Olympic Studios in October 1969, with contributions from Mick Jagger (lead vocal), Ringo Starr (drums), and probably also Bill Wyman (bass) and Mick Taylor (guitar). It was shelved until 1993, when it was issued as a bonus track on the 24K gold re-release by DCC Compact Classics (DCC Compact Classics GZS 1049). The Rolling Stones included the song, under the title "Shine a Light" on their 1972 album Exile on Main St..

In 1972, Russell did a concert tour with his Shelter People entourage. One performance was recorded in California at the Long Beach Arena on August 28, 1972, and was released as a three-record set in 1973 as Leon Live. It became his third U.S. gold album. In November 1972, Billboard cited Russell as a top concert draw and reported the 1972 tour gross at almost $3 million. Also in 1972, he released his Carney album, which was his third solo studio album. The album peaked at number two on the Billboard 200. The album featured "Tight Rope" and "This Masquerade" (songs released on a 45 as the A side and B side respectively), and became his second gold album.

Looking Back was released by Russell on Olympic Records in 1973, shortly after the success of his single "Tight Rope". It contains instrumental tracks recorded in the mid-1960s, featuring Russell playing the harpsichord. In 1975 Russell released Live In Japan on Shelter Records. The album was recorded live at Budokan Hall, in Tokyo, on November 8, 1973. Russell made it into the 1975 Top 40 with "Lady Blue," from his album Will o' the Wisp. It was his fourth gold album.

Helen Reddy recorded Russell's song "Bluebird" as a single and on her 1975 album No Way to Treat a Lady. The song debuted on the Billboard Hot 100 in the July 5 issue of the magazine and eventually peaked at number 35. That same issue also marked its debut on the magazine's Easy Listening chart, where it spent eight weeks and peaked at number 5; on the RPM singles chart it reached number 51. Reddy said, "I love Leon Russell's writing and I love this song. It was an integral part of my repertoire for nearly 30 years, and I never tired of singing it."

=== "This Masquerade" ===
Russell's song "This Masquerade," the B-side of his 1972 hit single "Tight Rope" was later recorded by many artists, including Reddy and the Carpenters. George Benson's version of the song reached number 10 on the Billboard Hot 100 and won Record of the Year at the 1977 Grammy Awards. As the songwriter, Russell was nominated for Song of the Year in 1977 but lost to Bruce Johnston, who wrote "I Write the Songs". Russell's version of "This Masquerade" was used for the soundtrack for the psychological thriller film Bug, which was directed by William Friedkin. The Bug soundtrack was released on May 22, 2007. The song was also used in the movie The Pursuit of Happyness.

=== A Star Is Born ===
In 1976, Russell and Barbra Streisand wrote the song "Lost Inside of You" for the film soundtrack of A Star Is Born. During a songwriting session at her house, Streisand began playing an original composition on her piano, and Russell was inspired to hum a countermelody which surprised and impressed Streisand. The interplay between the two songwriters was fictionalized for a scene in the film showing Streisand and Kris Kristofferson writing the song together. The A Star Is Born soundtrack received a Grammy Nomination for Best Album of Original Score written for a Motion Picture or Television Special.

In 1976, Russell released the Wedding Album, a studio album with his then wife, Mary Russell, otherwise known as Mary McCreary. It was the first release by Paradise Records, and it was distributed by Warner Bros. Records. Leon and Mary were the album producers, except for the final track "Daylight," which was produced by its writer, Bobby Womack. On May 15, 1976, Leon and Mary performed "Satisfy You" and "Daylight" with John Belushi impersonating Joe Cocker on Saturday Night Live. Make Love to the Music is the second album by Leon & Mary Russell released in 1977 on Paradise Records. In 1978, Russell released his Americana album on the Warner Bros. label.

After touring with Willie Nelson, Russell and Nelson in 1979 had a No. 1 hit on Billboards country music chart with their duet of "Heartbreak Hotel". This single was nominated for Best Country Vocal Performance by a Duo or Group at the 1979 Grammy Awards (presented on February 27, 1980), with the award going to the Charlie Daniels Band for "The Devil Went Down to Georgia". They also released their duet country pop-rock studio album, One for the Road, that year. It was Russell's fifth gold album. The album was nominated for 1979's Album of the Year awarded by the Country Music Association, which went to Kenny Rogers for The Gambler. The track "I Saw the Light" was nominated for Best Inspirational Performance at the 1979 Grammy Awards, which instead went to B. J. Thomas for his album You Gave Me Love (When Nobody Gave Me A Prayer).

Russell released Life And Love, an album on Paradise Records, in 1979. Life and Love has country, rock, and blues songs which hark back to his work in the early 1970s.

=== Building The Church Studio ===
Russell purchased multiple properties in the early 1970s in his home state of Oklahoma, including the historic The Church Studio in 1972 located on the corner of 3rd Street and Trenton in Tulsa, Oklahoma. The Church was also home to Shelter Records. Many musicians recorded at The Church including Willie Nelson, Eric Clapton, Bonnie Raitt, Dwight Twilley, Dr. John, JJ Cale, the Gap Band, Freddie King, Phoebe Snow, and Peter Tosh. Tom Petty, with his early band Mudcrutch, signed his first record deal with Shelter Records there.

=== A Poem Is a Naked Person ===
In 1972, after viewing the Les Blank film, The Blues Accordin' to Lightnin' Hopkins, Russell and Cordell hired Blank to film a documentary of the activities at the Shelter Records studio in Russell's compound at the Grand Lake o' the Cherokees in Oklahoma. Blank shot film footage for two years. Russell did not care for the finished film, and during the breakup of Shelter Records, traded his forgiveness of some of Cordell's loans in exchange for full ownership of the film. Russell would not allow the finished film to be shown, saying, "This film will never be seen in public."

Forty years later, a Disney movie changed Russell's mind. He explained: "After Les Blank died, his son, Harrod, came to see me, offering to recut the film and also digitize it to enhance the quality. Plus, I had recently seen a Disney movie, Saving Mr. Banks. After watching that, I realized sometimes we just say no to be just saying no, and I realized I was being selfish about it." Harrod Blank remastered and released the film, editing out 14 minutes of the original film. Russell said to Harrod Blank, "I don’t know how you did it, but this is so much better than what I remembered."

=== "Hank Wilson" persona ===
In 1973 Russell created the fictional musical personality Hank Wilson, and recorded the album Hank Wilson's Back Vol. I at producer Owen Bradley's Bradley's Barn studio in Nashville. He said "'Hank Wilson' came about on a road trip. "I was bringing a car back from L.A., and I stopped at a truck stop that had about 500 country tapes for sale. I bought a bunch and listened to them on the way home (to Tulsa). I don't really listen to records very much, except for research. I liked some of that stuff, though, and thought it would be fun to do a record like that."

The album reached No. 28 on the Billboard chart in 1973. The first track, "Roll in My Sweet Baby's Arms," was a minor hit. In 2010, a BBC review called the album "one of the most joyful sidebars of his career...a deeply entertaining album that, like all great country, turns melancholy and gloom into melody and dancing."

=== The Gap Band ===
Russell helped the Gap Band, a trio of Tulsa brothers, kick off their chart success in 1974. The group went on to produce several funk-disco hits. The Gap Band backed Russell on his album Stop All That Jazz.

=== Helped develop Linn drum machines ===
As a teenager, Roger Linn played guitar in Russell's band. In 1977 Linn created the first programmable drum machine that used actual drum beat samples. Russell suggested that Linn also add longer-length loops as well as sampled hand claps, explaining a recording session that included clapping quickly becomes a burden for performers during multiple takes. Russell used Linn's drum machine for all of the percussion on his Life and Love album.

In 1984 Linn created the pressure sensitive Linn9000 drum machine and credited Russell with the inspiration to add "sloppy" or shuffle timing. Linn said, "It was Leon who taught me about swing timing, which he called 'shuffle'. He explained that one of the big factors in a drummer’s feel was the degree of shuffle timing in his playing.... I added the code to delay—by a variable amount.... This allowed me to dial in the exact groove I wanted."

=== Paradise Records ===
Russell departed Shelter Records in 1976 to start his own record label, Paradise Records.

=== Paradise Studios ===
Russell built and owned Paradise Studios in Burbank, California; the recording studio had two audio sound stages and a television production stage. The studio complex also had a mobile audio recording bus and a remote television production bus which supported the stages or could travel. Paradise Records was headquartered at the studio. The studio aired a weekly live television music show New Wave Theatre shown on the USA cable network. The studio was used to make music videos for James Taylor and Randy Meisner and also long format videos for Willie Nelson, J.J. Cale, Bonnie Raitt, and Russell.

== 1980s - Concert tours ==
=== ABC Network "We Belong Together" campaign ===
Russell and Aretha Franklin were the singers on the ABC Television Network 1985-1986 Fall promotional campaign. The three and a half minute song "We Belong Together" was written by Brock Walsh. The commercial first aired on July 6, 1986.

=== 1980s recordings and concerts ===
Russell toured with the New Grass Revival in 1980 and 1981, releasing two more albums with Paradise Records before the label folded. On May 1, 1982, Russell played at Joe Ely's Third Annual Tornado Jam in Lubbock, Texas to a crowd of 25,000. The Jam included Joan Jett and the Crickets. On May 15, 1980, Russell joined with New Grass Revival to record a live album at Perkins Palace in Pasadena, California, released in 1981 as The Live Album (Leon Russell and New Grass Revival).

In 1982, Russell played piano and percussion on New Grass Revival's Commonwealth album. Continuing with a country theme he made a second Hank Wilson album, Hank Wilson, Vol. II released in 1984, Hank Wilson being Russell's self-styled country music alter-ego since the early 1970s. It was released on Leon Russell Records. Russell released a country blues album, recorded in Hendersonville, Tennessee at his Paradise Studios, called Solid State. It was released by Paradise Music in 1984.

In 1985, Russell toured the United States. He released the compilation album Best of Leon Russell: A Song for You. In 1988 and 1989 Edgar Winter and Russell went on a tour of the United States and Canada. Winter is a multi-instrumentalist, songwriter, and record producer. In 2002 the DVD Edgar Winter – Live on Stage, Featuring Leon Russell was released.

== 1990s - 2000s - recording and touring ==
Russell released Delta Lady on Del Rack Records in 1991. Many of the songs are remixes of early recordings. He released a new album Anything Can Happen recorded at Paradise Studios, released on Virgin Records in 1991. Pianist Bruce Hornsby produced this comeback album. During the late 1980s and early 1990s Hornsby worked extensively as a producer and sideman with Russell. In 1993, Paradise Records released the Leon Russell 24k Gold Disc album. It was a remix of recordings done at Olympic Sound in London in 1969.

Russell started Leon Russell Records, an independent record label, in 1995. Russell released his Hymns of Christmas album with ten instrumental hymns by Leon Russell Piano and Orchestra on Leon Russell Records in 1995. Capitol/EMI Records in 1996 released the album Gimme Shelter! The Best of Leon Russell, a two-CD album set with 40 tracks covering 1969–1992. Capitol/Right Stuff Records released in 1997 the album Retrospective, an album with Russell's 18 all-time best-selling songs.

Russell released a new album under his country artist name Hank Wilson, Legend in My Time: Hank Wilson Vol. III, on Ark 21 Records, in 1998 . Russell released Face in the Crowd in 1999, a blues album on Sagestone Entertainment Records. Blues: Same Old Song CD was released on Paradise Records in 1999.

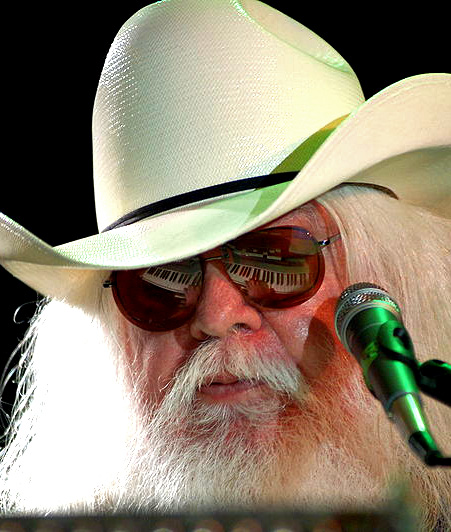
Russell performing in Ft. Lauderdale, Florida, April 2009

In 2000, Russell and Q Records released Live at Gilley's, a performance from September 17, 1981, at Gilley's Club. Also in 2000, Leon Russell Records released the rock album Crazy Love on CD. In 2001, Russell teamed up with multi-instrumentalist Matt Harris to make the latter's album Slightly Elliptical Orbit. They wrote 10 songs for the 12-track album, and Russell sang on the "This Train" track. The album was released in 2002 on Leon Russell Records.

Signature Songs was released in 2001 on Leon Russell Records. It has Russell playing his top songs from his career. It was re-released in 2007 by MRI Associated Labels. Russell returned as Hank Wilson, but this time with a twist of bluegrass, in Rhythm & Bluegrass: Hank Wilson, Vol. 4, released in 2001 on Leon Russell Records. The songs are with New Grass Revival from the 1980s. Russell and the others who played on the "Foggy Mountain Breakdown" track each won Grammy Awards for Best Country Instrumental Performance at the 2001 Grammy Awards, which were presented on February 27, 2002. Moonlight & Love Songs, an album Russell made with the Nashville Symphony, was released on Leon Russell Records in 2002.

In 2002, Russell released a 95-minute DVD titled A Song for You, that features 25 Russell classic songs from the Shelter People to 2001. There is biographical commentary throughout the DVD. The video is of both concerts and studio sessions. The DVD album Live And Pickling Fast was released in the same year. This was a new album of the live Perkins Palace event on May 15, 1980. It had all the original songs from The Live Album (with New Grass Revival), plus all the other songs from the event and bonus tracks. In 2006, Russell did a 12-city concert tour of the United States. On April 23, he received the Living Legend award at Bare Bones International Film Festival and in October he was inducted into the Oklahoma Music Hall of Fame.

Also in 2006, Russell released the Okie rock album Angel in Disguise on his Leon Russell Records label. Bad Country released on Leon Russell Records in 2007, with 12 original songs by Russell. Russell played at Diversafest, Tulsa's music conference and festival, in 2007.

Almost Piano was released in 2007 by Leon Russell Records. It is a synthesizer piano collection of ten instrumentals from Russell. In Your Dreams was released on CD by Leon Russell Records in 2008, as was A Mighty Flood, a gospel album with original songs by him. Billboard magazine described the latter as "a recent treat" and "buoyant".

== 2010s - Sixth gold album ==
On January 31, 2010, Russell joined the Zac Brown Band to play the song "Chicken Fried" at the Grammy Awards. Zac Brown Band won the Best New Artist award. After years of reduced prominence, Russell's career was rejuvenated when Elton John sought him for a new project. In November 2009, Russell worked with John and Bernie Taupin on The Union, a double album record credited equally to Russell and John. Recorded in February 2010 and produced by T Bone Burnett, the CD was released on October 19, 2010.

I wanted to give Elton something. But what do you give a guy who has six fully stocked houses? So I thought the only thing I could give him is a song. "In the Hands of Angels," retelling of the story of the album [The Union], thanks Mr. John ("the guv'ner" in the lyrics), who knew all the places I needed to go and made me feel the love down deep inside.

— Leon Russell

The Union was Russell's sixth gold album. The recordings were interrupted in January 2010 when Russell was hospitalized and underwent surgery for a brain fluid leak, as well as treatment for heart failure and pneumonia. A couple of months later, Russell announced plans for a solo LP, although no specifics were given, and in October 2010 Russell and John embarked on The Union Tour. John and Russell also appeared on the Late Show with David Letterman.

Russell and John were nominated for their track "If It Wasn't for Bad," from their The Union album, for Best Pop Collaboration with Vocals at the 2010 Grammy Awards, which were presented on February 13, 2011. In 2011, the documentary film The Union by Cameron Crowe was released. It explored the creative process of John and Russell in the making of the 2010 album The Union. On April 2, 2011, Russell and John performed together as the musical guests on Saturday Night Live. Rolling Stone placed the album in third place on its list of the 30 Best Albums of 2010.

In 2012, Russell and Vince Gill sang the song "A Way to Survive" on the Living for a Song: A Tribute to Hank Cochran studio album by Jamey Johnson. Russell played in Willie Nelson's Fourth of July Picnic in Fort Worth, Texas, in 2013. He had first played at the picnic in 1973. On June 23, 2013, Russell performed on the CMT Crossroads broadcast with Willie Nelson, Sheryl Crow, Jamey Johnson, Norah Jones, Ashley Monroe and Neil Young.

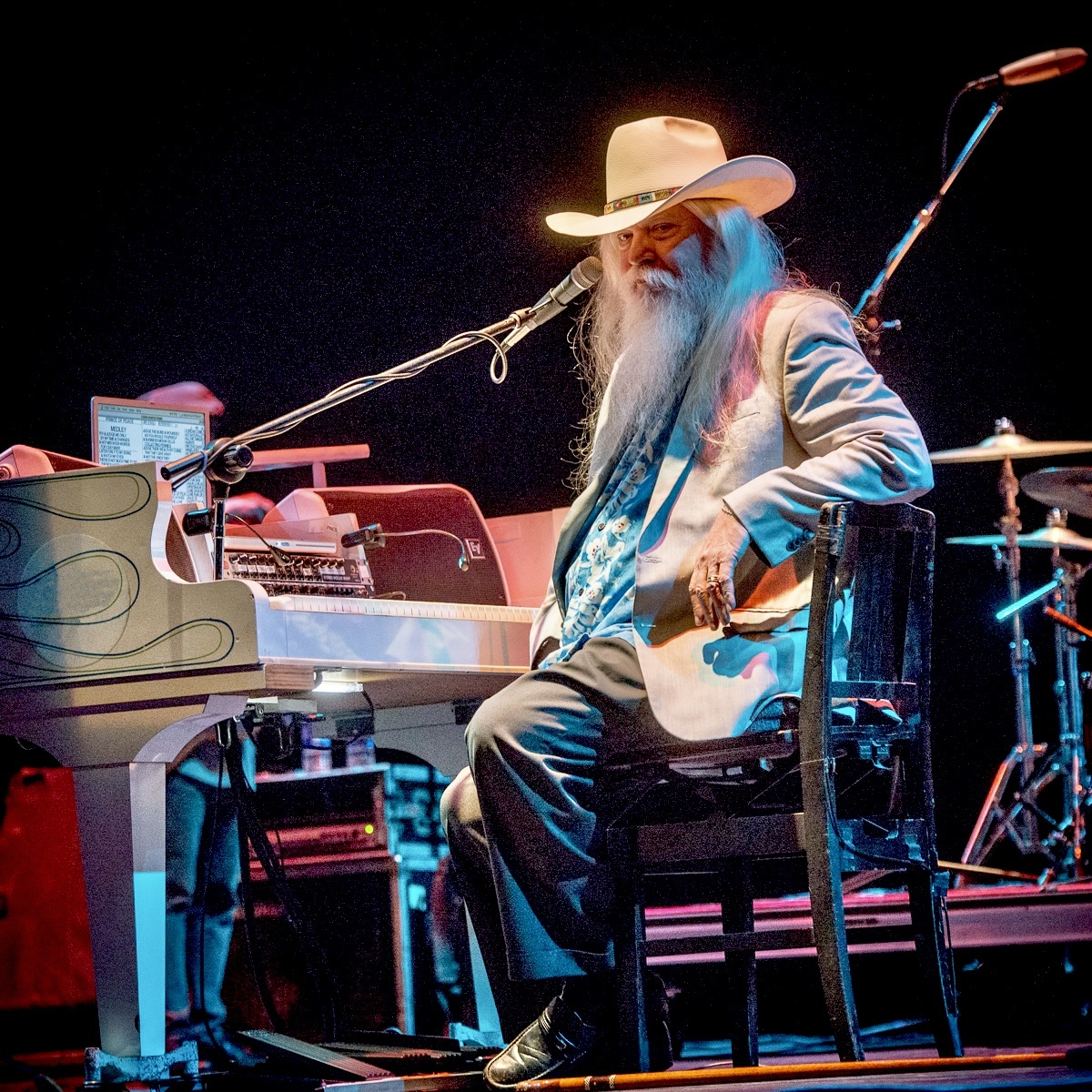
Russell telling a story between songs, performing in Albany, New York, February 2016

In 2014, the album Life Journey was released on Universal Records. Working with Tommy LiPuma, this album included two new songs by Russell: "Big Lips" and "Down in Dixieland". On March 16, 2015, a restored version of a previously unreleased 1974 documentary about Russell, A Poem Is a Naked Person by filmmaker Les Blank, was screened at the South by Southwest Film Festival. The film features concert footage of Russell in New Orleans and Anaheim and the recording sessions for the album Hank Wilson's Back. In 2015, Russell played at Virginia's Lockn' Festival and the Wildflower! Arts and Music Festival in Richardson, Texas.

On May 30, 2015, Russell, Bonnie Raitt and Ivan Neville gave a performance at The Canyon Club in Agoura Hills, California to raise money for Marty Grebb who was battling cancer. Grebb had played on some of their albums. On September 11, 2015, he joined Rita Coolidge, Claudia Lennear, Chris Stainton, and other members of the 1970 Mad Dogs & Englishmen Tour for a tribute concert to Joe Cocker organized by the Tedeschi Trucks Band. Original tour photographer Linda Wolf documented the reunion and performance.

Russell had a nationwide concert tour in 2016 and was planning to tour into 2017. The album On a Distant Shore, recorded in 2016, was posthumously released in September 2017. The album has 12 songs written by Russell. Two of his daughters, Coco Bridges and Sugaree Noel Bridges, perform backing vocals on it.

== Failing health and death ==
In 2010, Russell had surgery for cerebrospinal fluid rhinorrhoea and was treated for heart failure. In July 2016, he suffered a heart attack and underwent heart bypass surgery. He died in his sleep at his Mount Juliet, Tennessee home on November 13, 2016, at the age of 74.

Russell's funeral was on November 18 at Victory Baptist Church in Mt. Juliet, and a public memorial was held at The Oral Roberts University Mabee Center on November 20 in Tulsa. His body is interred at Memorial Park Cemetery in Tulsa.

== Musical influence ==
I first saw Leon Russell in 1971 or 1972. Then, as now, Leon made everything happen when he took the stage. For heaven's sake, his rock and roll credits could fill up a big inscribed monolith, if they still made such things.

— Elvis Costello

Russell's music style encompassed rock, country, gospel, bluegrass, rhythm and blues, southern rock, blues rock, rock and roll, folk, surf, swamp rock, and Tulsa sound.

Elton John, who had once been Russell's opening act, acknowledged him as his "biggest influence as a piano player, a singer and a songwriter". After hearing of Russell's death he said: "My darling Leon Russell passed away last night. He was a mentor, inspiration and so kind to me. I loved him and always will." John once recalled:

When Mr. Russell's "Greatest Hits" album came on one day during the trip, I started to cry, it moved me so much. His music takes me back to the most wonderful time in my life, and it makes me so angry that he's been forgotten.

Pixies vocalist Black Francis credits Russell with influencing his vocal style: "I realise there's a certain kind of vocalising I do that takes its cue from Leon Russell. He sang in a Southern accent but it was very blown-out and exaggerated, very free and loose." One of Russell's titles and signature nicknames is "Master of Space and Time".

The depth and scope of Russell's contribution to the music of the twentieth century is illustrated by:

408 albums on which he received a credit

251 total artistic credits
37 types of artistic credit

- Piano – 77 credits
- Arranger – 23
- Keyboards – 20
- Guitar – 17
- Organ – 14
- Electric piano – 11
- Guest – 11
- Vocals – 11
- Bass – 10
- Miscellaneous – 58 (includes percussion, trumpet, moog, clavinet and 23 more types)

282 total writing credits
Five types of writing credit

- Songwriter – 161 credits
- Writer – 87
- Composer – 20
- Music – 8
- Lyrics – 6

45 production credits

== Personal life ==
Russell had six children: a daughter from a relationship with Carla McHenry; a son and daughter from his first marriage to Mary McCreary; and three daughters from his later marriage to Janet Lee Constantine.

== Grammy Awards ==
The Grammy Awards are awarded annually by the National Academy of Recording Arts and Sciences to recognize outstanding achievements in music, and are widely regarded as the most prestigious awards in the music industry worldwide.

Year	Nominee / work	Award	Result
2011	"If It Wasn't For Bad" with Elton John (singer)	Grammy Award for Best Pop Collaboration with Vocals	Nominated
2002	"Foggy Mountain Breakdown"	Best Country Instrumental Performance	Won
1980	"I Saw The Light" with Willie Nelson	Grammy Award for Best Inspirational Performance	Nominated
1980	"Heartbreak Hotel" with Willie Nelson	Grammy Award for Best Country Vocal Performance By A Duo Or Group	Nominated
1978	"A Star Is Born"	Grammy Award for Best Album of Original Score For A Motion Picture Or A Television Special	Nominated
1978	"A Star Is Born"	Grammy Award for Best Original Score Written For A Motion Picture Or A Television Special	Nominated
1977	"This Masquerade"	Grammy Award for Song of the Year	Nominated
1973	"The Concert For Bangladesh"	Grammy Award for Album of the Year	Won

== Country Music Association Awards ==
The Country Music Association Awards, also known as the CMA Awards or CMAs, are presented to country music artists and broadcasters to recognize outstanding achievement in the country music industry.

Year	Nominee / work	Award	Result
1979	"One for the Road" with Willie Nelson	Album of the Year	Nominated

== BAFTA Awards ==
The British Academy Film Awards, more commonly known as the BAFTA Awards, honor the best British and international contributions to film.

Year	Nominee / work	Award	Result
1978	"A Star Is Born"	Anthony Asquith Award for Film Music	Nominated

== Accolades ==
- 1973: Top Concert Attraction in the World – Billboard
- 1979: Muskogee (Oklahoma) Living Legend
- 2006: Lifetime Achievement Award – Bare Bones International Film Festival
- 2006: Oklahoma Music Hall of Fame
- 2011: Oklahoma Blues Hall of Fame
- 2011: Rock and Roll Hall of Fame – first recipient of the Award for Musical Excellence
- 2011: Songwriters Hall of Fame
- 2018: "A Song For You" – inducted into Grammy Hall Of Fame
- 2022: Oklahoma Hall of Fame

== Discography ==
=== Studio and live albums ===
Year	Album	Peak chart positions								Certifications (sales thresholds)
Year	Album	US	US Country	AUS	CAN	CAN Country	NOR	NZ	UK	Certifications (sales thresholds)
1968	Look Inside the Asylum Choir (with Marc Benno)	201	—	—	—	—	—	—	—	
1970	Leon Russell	60	—	9	—	—	—	—	—	
1971	Leon Russell and the Shelter People	17	—	5	14	—	—	—	29	RIAA: Gold
1971	Asylum Choir II (with Marc Benno) recorded 1967–1969	70	—	54	—	—	—	—	—	
1972	Carney	2	—	6	4	—	—	—	—	RIAA: Gold
1973	Looking Back	—	—	—	–	—	—	—	—	
1973	Leon Live	9	—	16	9	—	18	—	—	RIAA: Gold
1973	Hank Wilson's Back Vol. I	28	15	60	85	—	—	—	—	
1974	Stop All That Jazz	34	—	58	43	—	—	—	—	
1975	Live in Japan	—	—	—	—	—	—	—	—	
1975	Will O' the Wisp	30	—	96	72	—	—	—	—	RIAA: Gold
1976	Wedding Album (with Mary Russell)	34	—	—	—	—	—	—	—	
1977	Make Love to the Music (with Mary Russell)	142	—	—	—	—	—	—	—	
1978	Americana	115	—	95	—	—	—	—	—	
1979	One for the Road (with Willie Nelson)	25	3	85	28	1	—	11	—	RIAA: Gold; MC: Gold
1979	Life and Love	204	—	—	—	—	—	—	—	
1981	The Live Album (with New Grass Revival)	187	—	—	—	—	—	—	—	
1984	Hank Wilson, Vol. II recorded 1979–1980	—	—	—	—	—	—	—	—	
1984	Solid State	—	—	—	—	—	—	—	—	
1992	Anything Can Happen	—	—	—	—	—	—	—	—	
1995	Hymns of Christmas	—	—	—	—	—	—	—	—	
1998	Legend in My Time: Hank Wilson Vol. III	—	—	—	—	—	—	—	—	
1999	Face in the Crowd	—	—	—	—	—	—	—	—	
1999	Blues: Same Old Song	—	—	—	—	—	—	—	—	
2000	Live at Gilley's (recorded 1981)	—	—	—	—	—	—	—	—	
2001	Guitar Blues (reissue)	—	—	—	—	—	—	—	—	
2001	Rhythm & Bluegrass: Hank Wilson, Vol. 4 (with New Grass Revival)	—	—	—	—	—	—	—	—	
2002	Moonlight & Love Songs (with the Nashville Symphony)	—	—	—	—	—	—	—	—	
2006	Angel in Disguise	—	—	—	—	—	—	—	—	
2007	Bad Country	—	—	—	—	—	—	—	—	
2007	Almost Piano	—	—	—	—	—	—	—	—	
2008	In Your Dreams	—	—	—	—	—	—	—	—	
2008	A Mighty Flood	—	—	—	—	—	—	—	—	
2010	The Union (with Elton John)	3	—	28	7	—	5	24	12	BPI: Silver; MC: Gold
2014	Life Journey	164	—	—	—	—	—	—	—	
2015	Prince of Peace: Radio Broadcast 1970	—	—	—	—	—	—	—	—	
2015	Riding the Northeast Trail: The New Jersey Broadcast 1979 (with Willie Nelson)	—	—	—	—	—	—	—	—	
2016	The Homewood Sessions: Vine Street TV Broadcast 1970	—	—	—	—	—	—	—	—	
2016	Live and Pickling Fast (with New Grass Revival) recorded 1980	—	—	—	—	—	—	—	—	
2017	On a Distant Shore	—	—	—	—	—	—	—	—	
"—" denotes releases that did not chart.

=== Compilation albums ===
Year	Album	Peak chart positions	Certifications (sales thresholds)
Year	Album	US	Certifications (sales thresholds)
1976	Best of Leon	40	RIAA: Gold
1985	Best of Leon Russell: A Song for You	—	
1991	Delta Lady	—	
1992	Collection	—	
1996	Gimme Shelter! The Best of Leon Russell	—	
1997	Retrospective	—	
2000	Crazy Love	—	
2001	Best of Leon Russell	—	
2001	Signature Songs	—	
2002	A Song for You (DVD)	—	
2005	Mystery Train (Live but Digitally Reworked)	—	
2009	Best of Hank Wilson	—	
2011	The Best of Leon Russell	—	
2013	Snapshot	—	
2013	The Montreux Session	—	
"—" denotes releases that did not chart.

=== Singles ===
Year	Single	Chart positions						Album
Year	Single	US	US Country	CAN	CAN Country	CAN AC	AUS	Album
1970	"A Song for You"	—	—	—	—	—	—	Leon Russell
1970	"Roll Away the Stone"	109	—	—	—	—	24	Leon Russell
1971	"The Ballad of Mad Dogs and Englishmen"	—	—	—	—	—	—	Leon Russell and the Shelter People (from the film Mad Dogs & Englishmen)
1971	"A Hard Rain's a-Gonna Fall"	105	—	—	—	—	11	Leon Russell and the Shelter People
1972	"Tryin' to Stay 'Live"	—	—	—	—	—	—	Asylum Choir II
1972	"Tight Rope"	11	—	5	—	—	24	Carney
1973	"Queen of the Roller Derby" (this track is from Leon Live)	89	—	—	—	—	—	Carney
1973	"Rollin' in My Sweet Baby's Arms" (as Hank Wilson)	78	57	—	30	—	74	Hank Wilson's Back, Vol. 1
1973	"I'm So Lonesome I Could Cry" (as Hank Wilson)	78	—	—	—	—	—	Hank Wilson's Back, Vol. 1
1974	"A Six Pack to Go" (as Hank Wilson)	—	68	—	76	—	—	Hank Wilson's Back, Vol. 1
1974	"If I Were a Carpenter"	73	—	87	—	—	97	Stop All That Jazz
1975	"Lady Blue"	14	—	44	—	18	—	Will O' the Wisp
1976	"Back to the Island"	53	—	—	—	33	—	Will O' the Wisp
1976	"Rainbow in Your Eyes"	52	—	—	—	—	—	Wedding Album
1978	"Elvis and Marilyn"	—	—	—	—	—	—	Americana
1979	"Heartbreak Hotel" (with Willie Nelson)	—	1	—	1	—	—	One for the Road
1984	"Good Time Charlie's Got the Blues"	—	63	—	—	—	—	Solid State
1984	"Wabash Cannonball" (as Hank Wilson, with Willie Nelson)	—	91	—	—	—	—	Hank Wilson, Vol. II
1992	"Anything Can Happen"	—	—	—	—	—	—	Anything Can Happen
1992	"No Man's Land"	—	—	—	—	—	—	Anything Can Happen
2000	"Crazy Love"	—	—	—	—	—	—	Crazy Love
2010	"If It Wasn't for Bad" (with Elton John)	—	—	—	—	—	—	The Union
"—" denotes releases that did not chart.

=== Music videos ===
Year	Video	Director
1992	"Anything Can Happen"	Sherman Halsey
1992	"No Man's Land"	Sherman Halsey

== See also ==
"This Masquerade"
George Benson's "This Masquerade" from Breezin', by Leon Russell

- Ambrose Campbell toured and recorded with Russell
- Don Nix producer/artist at Shelter Records
- Jesse Ed Davis friend who was introduced by Russell to recording session work
- Kathi McDonald Russell's main background vocalist
- Patrick Henderson songwriter/artist with Russell
- Indianola Mississippi Seeds, B.B. King made Russell's "Hummingbird" a hit
- Muscle Shoals Rhythm Section session musicians who helped make some of Russell's songs 'hit singles'
