= Guitar Blues =

Studio album by Leon Russell
- Released: August 21, 2001
- Recorded: 1995
- Genre: Blues rock
- Length: 42:43
- Label: Leon Russell Records

Leon Russell chronology
Live at Gilley's (2000)	Guitar Blues (2001)	Rhythm & Bluegrass: Hank Wilson, Vol. 4 (2001)

Professional ratings
Review scores
Source	Rating
Allmusic	3.5/5 stars

Guitar Blues is an album by singer and songwriter Leon Russell. The album was released on August 21, 2001 by Leon Russell Records. The album was by produced and all songs were written and performed by Russell. Guitar Blues was recorded in 1995. Leon show cases this guitar skills. Russell plays all the instruments, excluding the drums, that are played by his son, Teddy Jack.

More C. Michael Bailey with "All About Jazz" reviewed the album: "It displays the guitar side of Mr. Russell and the listener will immediately identify his guitar playing (It has changed little since Dogs and Englishmen."

== Track listing ==
1. "Ways of a Woman" 4:37
2. "House of Blues" 02:42
3. "Rip Van Winkle" 2:46
4. "This Love I Have for You" 3:14
5. "Lost Inside the Blues" 4:27
6. "Dark Carousel" 4:21
7. "It's Impossible" 2:41
8. "My Hard Times" 4:29
9. "Strange Power of Love" 3:26
10. "Make Everything Alright" 3:36
11. "The Same Old Song" 3:55
12. "End of the Road" 02:29

== Personnel ==
- Leon Russell – guitar
- Teddy Jack – drums
- Buster Phillips – drums
