= Anything Can Happen (album) =

Studio album by Leon Russell
- Released: 1992
- Label: Virgin
- Producer: Leon Russell; Bruce Hornsby

Leon Russell chronology
Solid State (1984)	Anything Can Happen (1992)	Hymns of Christmas (1995)

Professional ratings
Review scores
Source	Rating
AllMusic	3/5 stars

Anything Can Happen is an album by singer and songwriter Leon Russell, his first following a ten-year break after the release of his last studio album Solid State. The album was released in 1992 and produced by Russell along with Bruce Hornsby with most of the songs written by the two. The album was released by Virgin in the UK and US.

People magazine reviewed the album: "From the marvelous shadows-and-light pop of the title track to the Turkish-ish 'Black Halos' to inventive reworkings of Chuck Berry’s 'Too Much Monkey Business' and 'Jezebel', this comely comeback is smooth but packs a kick".

On July 21, 1992, Russell performed "Anything Can Happen" live on Late Night with David Letterman.

== Track listing ==
1. "Anything Can Happen" (Bruce Hornsby, Leon Russell) – 4:06
2. "Black Halos" (B. Hornsby, Russell) – 3:43
3. "No Man's Land" (B. Hornsby, Russell) – 3:38
4. "Too Much Monkey Business" (Chuck Berry) – 2:58
5. "Angel Ways" (B. Hornsby, Russell) – 4:01
6. "Life of the Party" (B. Hornsby, Russell) – 2:51
7. "Stranded on Easy Street" (B. Hornsby, John Hornsby) – 4:25
8. "Jezebel" (Traditional, arranged by Leon Russell) – 3:51
9. "Love Slave" (Russell) – 3:01
10. "Faces of the Children" (B. Hornsby, Russell) – 3:45

== Personnel ==
- Vocals, guitar – Leon Russell
- Keyboards – Bruce Hornsby
- Guest artist – Edgar Winter
