= Angel in Disguise (album) =

Studio album by Leon Russell
- Released: 2006
- Recorded: 2006
- Studio: The Parlor Recording Studio
- Genre: Rock; funk
- Length: 42:24
- Label: Leon Russell Records

Leon Russell chronology
Moonlight & Love Songs (2002)	Angel in Disguise (2006)	Bad Country (2007)

Professional ratings
Review scores
Source	Rating
Allmusic	3.5/5 stars

Angel in Disguise is an album by singer, multi-instrumentalist and songwriter Leon Russell. The album was produced by Russell and released in 2006 by Leon Russell Records.

== Track listing ==
All songs written by Leon Russell.

1. "Sweet Mimi" – 4:05
2. "How Can This Be Love" – 4:18
3. "Angel in Disguise" – 3:44
4. "Lovin' on My Mind" – 4:13
5. "Come for You" – 3:46
6. "Honey & Eli" – 4:55
7. "Black n' Blue" – 3:50
8. "All Through the Night" – 4:19
9. "Honkey Tonk Eyes" – 2:28
10. "Dyess Colony" – 3:47
11. "Desire Inside Your Eyes" – 5:13
