= Moonlight & Love Songs =

Studio album by Leon Russell and Nashville Symphony
- Released: April 9, 2002
- Recorded: 2002
- Genre: Pop; rock
- Length: 43:42
- Label: Leon Russell Records
- Producer: Leon Russell

Leon Russell and Nashville Symphony chronology
Rhythm & Bluegrass: Hank Wilson, Vol. 4 (2001)	Moonlight & Love Songs (2002)	Angel in Disguise (2006)

Professional ratings
Review scores
Source	Rating
Allmusic	3/5 stars

Moonlight & Love Songs is an album by singer and songwriter Leon Russell and the Nashville Symphony. Russell departs from past albums to sing all songs written by other artists. The album was recorded in 2002 in Nashville, Tennessee, and produced by Russell. The album was released on CD on April 9, 2002.

== Track listing ==
1. Orchestra Tuning 0:20
2. The Very Thought of You (Ray Noble) 4:12
3. That's All (Alan Brandt / Bob Haymes) 3:05
4. My Funny Valentine (Lorenz Hart / Richard Rodgers) 3:46
5. Smoke Gets in Your Eyes (Otto Harbach / Jerome Kern) 3:24
6. Stormy Weather (Harold Arlen / Ted Koehler) 3:22
7. Once in a While (Michael Edwards / Bud Green) 4:13
8. That Lucky Old Sun (Just Rolls Around Heaven All Day) (Haven Gillespie / Harry B. Smith) 5:18
9. 'Round Midnight (Bernie Hanighen / Thelonious Monk / Cootie Williams) 3:38
10. The Shadow of Your Smile (Johnny Mandel / Paul Francis Webster) 4:25
11. As Time Goes By (song) (Herman Hupfeld) 3:41
12. Angel Eyes (Earl Brent / Matt Dennis) 4:18

== Personnel ==
- Leon Russell: Keyboards, Piano, Vocals
- Edgar Winter: Sax (Alto)
- Jim Price : Trumpet
- Nashville Symphony
- Bruce Hornsby Piano on "That Lucky Old Sun"
