= Tight Rope (song) =

- Side A of the US single

Single by Leon Russell

from the album Carney
- B-side: "This Masquerade"
- Released: August 1972
- Genre: Blue-eyed soul
- Length: 2:59
- Label: Shelter 7325
- Songwriter(s): Leon Russell
- Producer(s): Denny Cordell; Leon Russell

Leon Russell singles chronology
"Tight Rope" (1972)	"Queen of the Roller Derby" (1973)

"Tight Rope" is the debut 1972 hit single by singer-songwriter Leon Russell. It was the lead track on his LP, Carney.

The song reached number 11 on the U.S. Billboard Hot 100 and number 10 on the Cash Box Top 100. In Canada, it reached number five.

This song is a circus metaphor about clinging to life while being on a high wire.

In the instrumental section, this song quotes a couple of times, a slow version of the "Entrance of the Gladiators" March, played in a mysterious descending scale, before Russell finishes the last half of the bridge section.

The B-side of 45 RPM for "Tight Rope" was "This Masquerade", also penned by Russell, which became a Top 10 hit for George Benson in 1976.

== Chart performance ==
=== Weekly charts ===
Chart (1972)	Peak position
Australia (Kent Music Report)	24
Canadian RPM Top Singles	5
U.S. Billboard Hot 100	11
U.S. Cash Box Top 100	10

=== Year-end charts ===
Chart (1972)	Rank
U.S. Billboard Hot 100	104
