= Carney (Leon Russell album) =

Studio album by Leon Russell
- Released: June 26, 1972
- Studios: Skyhill (Hollywood); Muscle Shoals (Sheffield, Alabama); Paradise (Tia Juana, Oklahoma)
- Genres: Roots rock; psychedelia
- Length: 37:34
- Labels: Shelter (US); A&M (UK)
- Producers: Denny Cordell, Leon Russell

Leon Russell chronology
Asylum Choir II (1971)	Carney (1972)	Looking Back (1973)

Carney is Leon Russell's third solo studio album, released in 1972. It peaked at number 2 on the Billboard Hot 200 and was the first for Russell to contain a hit single — "Tight Rope" b/w "This Masquerade" — which reached number 11 on the Billboard Hot 100 chart.

Side one of the record profiles roots rock, while side two features psychedelic music. The album has been described as semi-autobiographical, with Russell using the record to draw parallels between his life and old-fashioned carnivals and circus clowns. The record reflects Russell's interests in vaudeville and sideshows and also features two experimental pieces.

== Composition ==
=== Musical style and themes ===
Stephen Thomas Erlewine describes Carney an "off-kilter" album that consolidates both extremes of Russell's oeuvre, with side one featuring relatively straightforward roots rock and side two profiling "twisted psychedelia". Bill Janovitz comments that it describes Russell's "surrealistic journey out in the woods of his newfound fame", veering between "ambivalence and outright rejection of that celebrity." He added: "At times, the album sounds like a demented circus stranded in a gnarled swamp. But it's mostly a collection of sedate and reflective songs." Music critic Joel Vance highlighted Russell's uniqueness as being aided by "his whorehouse piano style and Oklahoma accent". He said: "Carney is like Rubber Soul; there isn't a unifying theme, but you come away from it thinking there is. Perhaps that's because of the role Russell portrays here, casting himself as a wanderer making entries in a musical diary."

The album's themes were inspired by the Band's Stage Fright (1970), which used similar metaphors for "the pitfalls of being famous travelling musicians." As Phil Hardy and Dave Laing commented, Carney shows a "different, mellower Russell" and, as with Stage Fright, explores "the personal costs of live performance". The album drew comparisons to Frederico Fellini's film 8½ (1963). Russell reflected: "My music was rather limited in its style up until about the time Carney was released. I started experimenting then with the crew to see if we couldn't come up with something else, sort of an open season on music." The record's producer, Denny Cordell, was not a fan of the final release. His son Barney Cordell later explained, "Leon always liked a bit of the vaudeville. Dad hated it. He liked pure rock 'n' roll. Carney's got that vaudeville thing. And then he started doing that stuff on stage ... They had a big fight over Carney."

=== Songs ===
Side one opens with "Tight Rope", a hooky "cry for help" with vaudeville and music hall influences; the uncluttered arrangement also features dobro and a guitar amplified through a revolving Leslie speaker, while Russell clicks his tongue to keep time on breaks. The song's melodicism changes into dissonance on the bridge. Vance calls it a bouncy song with "nice rhythm breaks". The percussion-heavy "Out in the Woods" is sung in a "Howlin' Wolf-via-Captain Beefheart" voice and features a Zulu language choir near its conclusion, while "Me and Baby Jane" is about a childhood sweetheart who dies of an overdose – inspired by What Ever Happened to Baby Jane? – and features piano and pump organ. "Manhattan Island Serenade" is a wistful ballad with a melody that has been compared to Paul McCartney; its intro features "the sound of tires swishing across wet pavement during a rainstorm". The thunderclaps were captured in stereo by engineer Marlin Greene during a storm that interfered with the studio's power twice. Two cheerful songs follow–"Cajun Love Song" and "Roller Derby", the latter a rock and roll song with New Orleans boogie piano and a Moog synth.

Side two, known by some fans as the "psychedelic side", commences with two experimental tracks, a reflection of Russell's perverse album sequencing. The first of these is the title track, a "Fellini-esque" piece described by Janovitz as "a comic wheezing-waterlogged calliope" that resembles "the Kurt Weill Threepenny Opera-inspired sounds" used by Tom Waits on Swordfishtrombones (1983). It is followed by "Acid Annapolis", a sound collage that is the only track not credited solely to Russell. Vance compares it to a "cheapo space movie" soundtrack, while Janovitz calls it an "avant-garde sound collage" which starts with "tormented ghostly moans sliding into a Zappa-warped doo-wop section set against the Chamberlin tape loops of voices." Russell sent the musicians into the studio at different times to "play anything they wanted, only allowing them to hear sample snippets of what else was on the track." Janovitz called it "a way to keep the salaried band members occupied, as he could not churn out songs quickly enough to keep them busy." "If the Shoe Fits" is a satirical country song describing individuals' reactions to rock stars; Robert Christgau contends that the song is "a cheap shot at hangers-on that says more about the performer's lot than 'Tight Rope' and 'Magic Mirror' put together."

== Release and reception ==
Professional ratings
Review scores
Source	Rating
AllMusic	4/5 stars
Christgau's Record Guide	B−
The Encyclopedia of Popular Music	4/5 stars

Released in 1972, Carney appeared at the height of Leon Russell's popularity, both as a recording artist and live performer. It reached number two on the US Billboard Top LPs & Tape chart, and sold a million copies. "Tight Rope" was released as a single and was his only top ten hit on the Cash Box charts; it also reached number eleven on the Billboard Hot 100.

Joel Vance of Stereo Review reviewed the album as a "Recording of Special Merit", classifying the performance as 'Really fine' and the recording as 'Excellent'. In his review, he commented that Russell's artistry had increased with each album and praised his uniqueness, believing he repeatedly makes "the right decision" in his work. He added, "Only Russell can sing so insinuatingly, which fits in perfectly with the 'Carney' role. He could be a folk hero, or he could be the Illustrated Man. Tempting, a little scary, a little sad, and damn good – Leon Russell can take care of himself."

In their review, Billboard wrote that Russell comes over as "a slightly off-beat surprise and a revelation into the mind of a 'superstar'." They noted that the album draws unobvious parallels between Russell's life and "an old-fashioned carnival", and believed it to be an "amazingly insightful work" that will enchant fans of the singer, whose "exaggerated twang" they deemed the most delightful in rock. Writing in Christgau's Record Guide (1981), Christgau wrote: "Not the radical falloff some report — just slippage, the first side listenable and the second flaky." He reserved praise for "If the Shoe Fits".

In a retrospective review for AllMusic, Erlewine described Carney as "an off-kilter, confused, fascinating album." He considered the second side to deflate the first side, believing it to be intriguing at times but "just too fuzzy" and inconsequential. He believed that the first side is "already odd enough, but in a meaningful way; here, his fascination with Americana sideshows is married to songs that work, instead of just being vehicles for tripping in the studio." He concluded that Carney is interesting for balance both the rootsy and psychedelic material, but "interesting doesn't equal compelling, as the whole of Carney bears out." Writing for The Virgin Encyclopedia of Popular Music (1997), Colin Larkin described Carney as a "poignantly stunning" album, and deemed it a semi-autobiographical work which uses "the circus clown theme as an analogy to his own punishing career."

== Track listing ==
All tracks composed by Leon Russell except where indicated.

Side one

1. "Tight Rope" – 2:59
2. "Out in the Woods" – 3:35
3. "Me and Baby Jane" – 3:53
4. "Manhattan Island Serenade" – 3:26
5. "Cajun Love Song" – 3:08
6. "Roller Derby" – 2:22

Side two

1. "Carney" – 0:45
2. "Acid Annapolis" (Leon Russell, Don Preston) – 2:51
3. "If the Shoe Fits" – 2:23
4. "My Cricket" – 2:56
5. "This Masquerade" – 4:22
6. "Magic Mirror" – 4:54

== Charts ==
Chart (1972)	Peak position
Australia (Kent Music Report)	6
United States (Billboard 200)	2

== Personnel ==
- Leon Russell – vocals, guitar, bass guitar, piano
- Don Preston – guitar, vocals
- Joey Cooper – guitar
- Carl Radle – bass guitar
- Chuck Blackwell, Jim Keltner – drums
- John Gallie – Hammond organ

Technical

- Marlin Greene, John Lemay, Peter Nicholls – engineer
- Gene Brownell – art direction
- Daniel Mayo – photography
