= Blues: Same Old Song =

Studio album by Leon Russell
- Released: 1999
- Recorded: 1999
- Genre: Blues rock
- Length: 42:34
- Label: Paradise Island

Leon Russell chronology
Face in the Crowd (1999)	Blues: Same Old Song (1999)	Live at Gilley's (2000)

Professional ratings
Review scores
Source	Rating
AllMusic	3/5 stars

Blues: Same Old Song is an album by singer and songwriter Leon Russell. The album was first released as a CD on December 7, 1999. Album was by produced by Leon Russell and released by For Life Japan. Songs were written by Leon.

== Track listing ==
All tracks composed by Leon Russell.

1. "Ways of a Woman" – 4:37
2. "House of Blues" – 2:41
3. "Rip Van Winkle" – 2:45
4. "This Love I Have for You" – 3:13
5. "Lost Inside the Blues" – 4:26
6. "Dark Carousel" – 4:23
7. "It's Impossible" – 2:40
8. "My Hard Times" – 4:28
9. "Strange Power of Love" – 3:26
10. "Make Everything Alright" – 3:34
11. "The Same Old Song" – 3:54
12. "End of the Road" – 2:27

== Personnel ==
- Leon Russell - Primary Artist
- Teddy Jack - Drums
- Buster Phillips - Drums
