= Paradise Records =

American record label

Paradise Records was an American record label founded by Leon Russell in 1976 in Burbank, California.

== History ==
Paradise Records was the second record label company founded by Russell, the first being Shelter Records which Russell co-founded with Denny Cordell in 1969. Russell ran Shelter with Cordell until 1976, when the two had a falling out. In a settlement, Cordell became sole owner of the Shelter Records label, and Russell left to start his own label, Paradise Records.

Paradise Records was learning place for Steve Ripley and members of Concrete Blonde; Ripley later started the country retro group, The Tractors.

Paradise Records are currently made and distributed by Warner Bros. Records.

== Paradise Studios ==
Paradise Records included Paradise Studios, a recording studio complex with two audio sound stages and one television production stage, as well as a remote recording bus and a remote television production bus that could support the stages or travel. The studio aired a weekly live television music show New Wave Theatre shown on USA Network. The studio produced music videos for James Taylor and Randy Meisner, and long-format videos for Willie Nelson, J.J.Cale, Bonnie Raitt and Leon Russell.

Russell sold the complex in 1982, after which it was home to Alpha Studios and then Oracle Post. In 2014, the facility became Bang Zoom! Entertainment's second multi-room production facility.

J. J. Cale and Leon Russell recorded a live session at Paradise Studios in June 1979. The previously unseen footage was discovered in Nashville in 2001 and features several tracks from 5 album, including "Sensitive Kind", "Lou-Easy-Ann", "Fate of a Fool", "Boilin' Pot", and "Don't Cry Sister". Cale worked at Paradise Studios as an engineer. The footage was officially released in 2003 as J.J. Cale featuring Leon Russell: In Session at the Paradise Studios.

== Distribution history ==
- In 1976 Paradise Records released its first album, the Wedding Album by Leon and Mary Russell. It is a studio album with his then wife, Mary Russell, otherwise known as Mary McCreary. It was distributed by Warner Bros. Records. Leon and Mary Russell were producers of the album, with the exception of the final track, "Daylight", which was produced by its writer, Bobby Womack. Leon and then-wife Mary Russell were musical guests on the May 15, 1976, episode of Saturday Night Live in its first season, hosted by Dyan Cannon.
- In 1976 Leon & Mary Russell released Rainbow In Your Eyes / Love's Supposed To Be That Way -a 7" single
- In 1976 Leon & Mary Russell released Satisfy You / Windsong -a 7", Promo single
- In 1997 Leon & Mary Russell released Make Love to the Music -an LP, Album
- In 1977 Gary Ogan released Gary Ogan -an LP, Album
- In 1977 Gary Ogan released The Road -a 7" single
- In 1977 Leon & Mary Russell released Say You Will -a 7" single
- In 1977 Leon & Mary Russell released Love Crazy -a 7" single
- In 1977 Leon & Mary Russell released Easy Love -a 7" single
- In 1977 Gary Ogan released Make Me Sing -a 7" single
- In 1978 Leon Russell released Elvis And Marilyn -a 7" single
- In 1978 Leon Russell released Americana -an LP, Album
- In 1978 Leon Russell released From Maine To Mexico -a 7" single
- In 1978 Leon Russell released Elvis And Marilyn / Anita Bryant -a 12", Promo release
- In 1979 Leon Russell released Life And Love -an LP, Album.
- In 1979 Mary Russell released Heart Of Fire - an LP, Album
- In 1979 Wornell Jones released Wornell Jones -an LP, Album
- In 1979 Mary Russell released Right Or Wrong / Up Against The Wall -a 7" single
- In 1979 Mary Russell released Up Against The Wall -a 7", Promo single
- In 1979 Wornell Jones released You Are My Happiness -a 7", Promo single
- In 1981 following up on his country theme, Leon released a second Hank Wilson album, Hank Wilson, Vol. II -an LP, Album (Hank Wilson being Leon's pseudonym name)
- In 1981 Leon Russell & New Grass Revival released The Live Album -an LP, Album
- In 1981 Leon Russell & New Grass Revival released I've Just Seen A Face -a 7", Promo single
- In 1984 Leon Russell released Hank Wilson - Wabash Cannonball -a 7", Promo single
- In 1984 Leon Russell released Solid State -an LP, Album.
- In 1984 Leon Russell re-released Hank Wilson Vol. II -an LP, Album
- In 1984 Leon Russell released Good Time Charlie's Got The Blues -a 7", Promo single
- In 1984 Leon Russell released Rescue My Heart -a 7", Single
- In 1984 Billy Chinnock released The Way She Makes Love -a 7", Promo single
- In 1984 Leon Russell released Oh Lonesome Me -a 7", Promo single
- In 1985 Paul Black And The Flip Kings released How How -an LP, Album
- In 1993 Paradise Records released the LEON RUSSELL 24K GOLD DISC -a CD, Album (A remix of recordings done at Olympic Sound in London in 1969)
- In 1997 Leon Russell/Paradise Records released Blues: Same Old Song -a CD, Album
- In 2012 Astronomy released Bali Moon -a CD, Album.
- In 2012 Astronomy released Golden Disc -a CDr Single
- In 2012 Astronomy released Bali Moon -a CDr Single

== See also ==
- Takoma Records
- Swamp pop
- Blues
- Country music
