= Marty Grebb =

American musician (1945–2020)

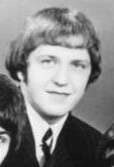

Background information
- Born: Martin Joseph Grebb; September 2, 1945; Chicago, Illinois, U.S.
- Died: January 1, 2020 (aged 74)
- Genres: Rock
- Instruments: Guitar; keyboards; saxophone; organ; piano; percussion; horn
- Years active: 1965–2019

Martin Joseph Grebb (September 2, 1945 – January 1, 2020) was an American keyboardist, guitarist, and saxophonist. A member of The Buckinghams in the late 1960s, Grebb was also a record producer and an arranger, who worked with musicians including Peter Cetera, Bill Payne, Bonnie Raitt, Eric Clapton, Etta James, and Leon Russell.

== Early life ==
Marty Grebb was born and raised in Chicago. He began studying music after his eighth birthday. His early interest in music can be attributed to his father, Harry, who was a saxophonist and played in the big-band era, both on the road and in the clubs of Chicago. However, Marty chose piano as his first instrument, turning to saxophone only two years later.

== Career ==
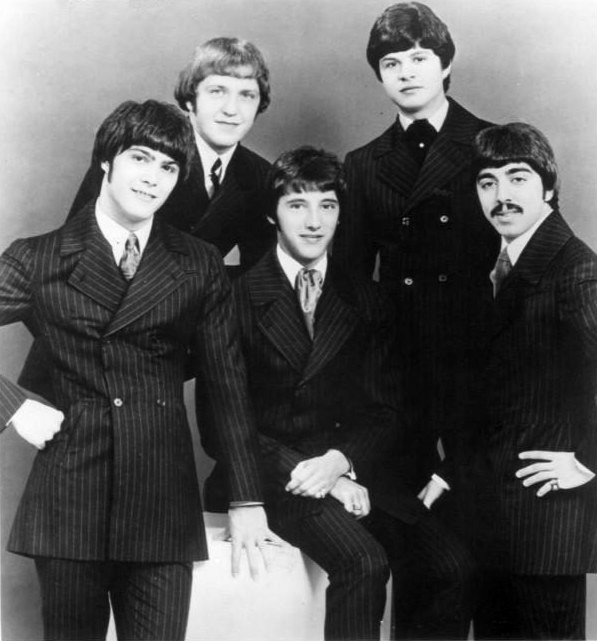
The Buckinghams in 1968. Left to right: Dennis Tufano, Marty Grebb, John Poulos, Carl Giammarese and Nick Fortuna.

Grebb was a member of a local Chicago cover band, Kal David and the Exceptions, in the early to mid 1960s. Grebb received a writing credit along with bandmembers Peter Cetera and Kal David for the group's recorded song, "Come On Home". After Kal David's departure the group became The Exceptions. Writer Steve Krakow termed The Exceptions a "proto-supergroup" whose lineup at that time included Peter Cetera and Jim Dondelinger (also known as James Vincent). Grebb, Cetera and Dondelinger each went on to other groups that achieved greater recording success and national recognition.

In 1966, another local band, The Buckinghams, required the services of a keyboardist, and Marty Grebb was asked to team up with them. Around this time, the band members were introduced to James William Guercio, a former bassist and road manager for Chad & Jeremy who found them a management contract with Ebbins-Guercio Associates. The band went on to have three (Billboard) and five (Cashbox) top-ten national selling singles and three top twenty albums with Marty Grebb for Columbia Records.

After the Buckinghams, Grebb toured with a number of artists, including Leon Russell, Elton John, Muddy Waters, and most notably Bonnie Raitt as a member of her band for 25 years. He was also a touring member of Chicago in 1980 and 1981.

Later, Grebb was a member of The Weight Band, featuring former members and collaborators of The Band. Grebb contributed to The Band's Jericho and Jubilation albums. In July 2017, PBS's Infinity Hall Live program aired a televised performance by The Weight Band, featuring new music by the band.

Grebb died on January 1, 2020.

== Solo discography ==
- Smooth Sailin' (1999)
- High Steppin (2009)

== Albums featuring Marty Grebb ==
This is a partial discography:

- Dick Campbell – Sings Where it's At (1965)
- Lovecraft – Valley of the Moon (1970)
- Bonnie Raitt – Give it Up (1972)
- Jackie Lomax – Three (1972)
- The Fabulous Rhinestones – The Fabulous Rhinestones (1972)
- The Tufano & Giammarese Band – The Tufano & Giammarese Band (1975)
- Jackie Lomax – Livin' For Lovin' (1976)
- Leon & Mary Russell – Wedding Album (1976)
- Olivia Newton-John – Totally Hot (1977)
- Roger McGuinn – Thunderbyrd (1977)
- Leon & Mary Russell – Make Love to the Music (1977)
- Gary Ogan – The Road (1977)
- Leon Russell – Americana (1978)
- Wornell Jones – Wornell Jones (1979)
- Bernie Taupin – He Who Rides the Tiger (1980)
- Mickey Thomas – Alive Alone (1981)
- The Knack – Round Trip (1981)
- Joe Vitale – Plantation Harbor (1981)
- Bonnie Raitt – Nick of Time (1989)
- Chet McCracken – Flight To Moscow (1990)
- Ian McNabb – Go into the Light (1994)
- Bonnie Raitt – Longing in Their Hearts (1994)
- Maria Muldaur – Meet Me at Midnite (1994)
- The Band – Jubilation (1998)
- Bonnie Raitt – Fundamental (1998)
- Rufus Wainwright – Rufus Wainwright (1998)
- Taj Mahal – The Best of the Private Years (2000)
- JJ Cale Featuring Leon Russell – In Session at the Paradise Studios – Los Angeles, 1979 (2002)
- JJ Cale & Eric Clapton – The Road to Escondido (2006)
- Alien Ant Farm – Up in the Attic (2006)
- 208 Talks of Angels – Blooming in Night (2014)
