= The Scuzzies =

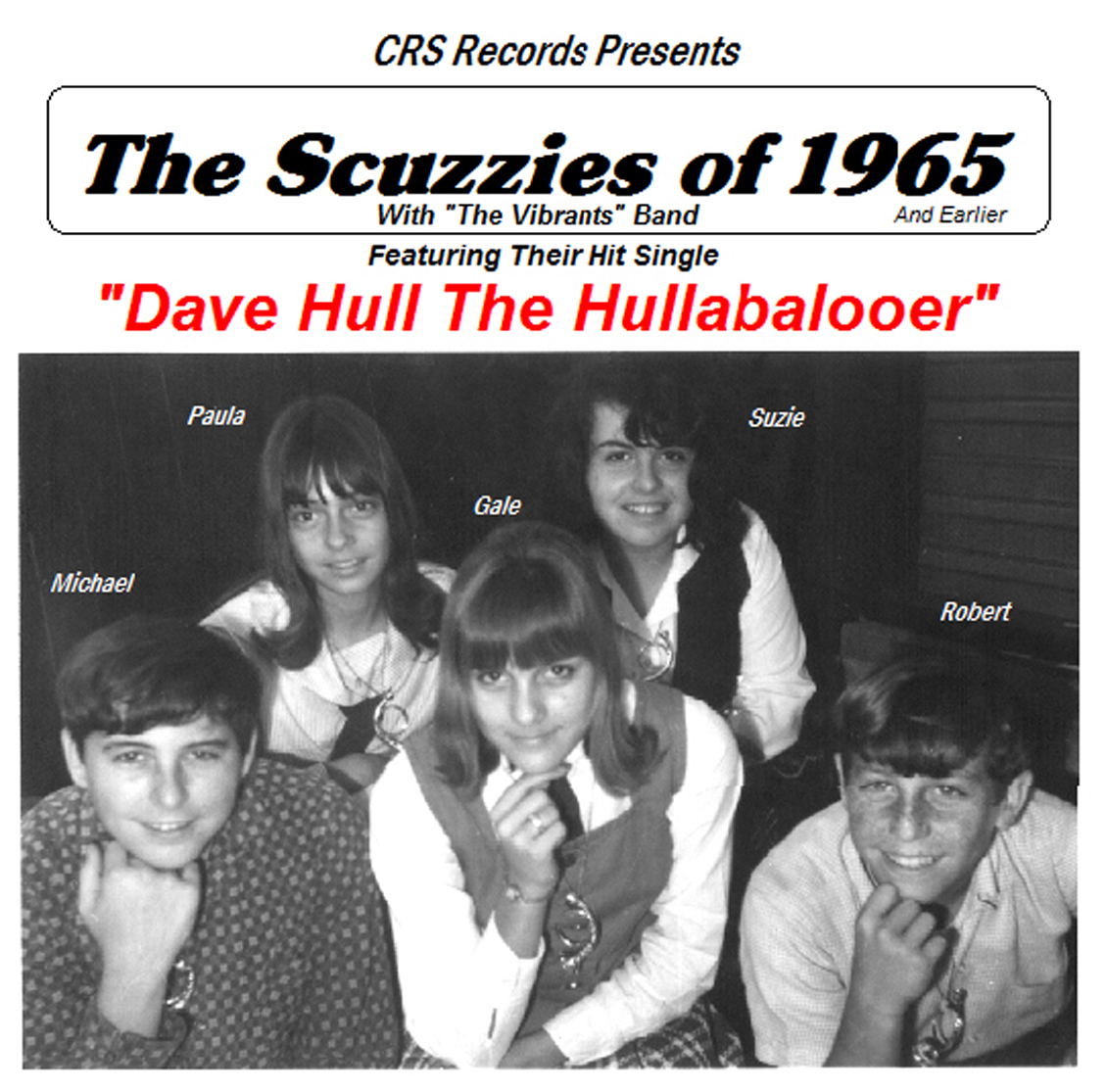

Background information
- Origin: Los Angeles, California, U.S.
- Years active: mid 1960s
- Label: CRS Records
- Past members: Suzie Cappetta; Michael Cappetta; Robert Cappetta; Gale Chodkowski; Paula Chodkowski

The Scuzzies were a mid-1960s recording and performing group of 5 teen cousins from the South Bay, Los Angeles area of California. The group gained notoriety for recording a song, written by group leader Suzie Cappetta, entitled "Dave Hull The Hullabalooer" in the winter of 1964. The song was a tribute to a popular Los Angeles Disc Jockey Dave Hull, AKA "The Hullabalooer" who worked at KRLA, a 50,000 watt AM radio station in South Pasadena, California. Hull was more recently named one of the top ten greatest broadcasters in Los Angeles radio history.

== Lineup ==
The core of The Scuzzies in 1964 consisted of 3 siblings, The Cappetta Kids, as they were known in earlier years. Suzie Cappetta, age 15, Michael Cappetta, age 14, and Robert Cappetta, age 11. Their two cousins, also siblings, Gale Chodkowski, age 14, and Paula Chodkowski, age 11, rounded out the quintet. Their recording of "Dave Hull The Hullabalooer" became a regional hit when the song made the Top 40 charts in Los Angeles by March 1965.

== Scuzzies meet Dave "The Hullabalooer" Hull ==
Following a phone call from fifteen year old Suzie Cappetta and her brother Mike, Hull first heard his song when the 5 kids went to the KRLA Pasadena studios, during the fall of 1964, to perform the song for him in person. Hull liked it so much that he wanted to put it "On The Air" right away, so he instructed an employee to take the kids upstairs to their recording booth and record it onto an acetate disc. Hull used the acetate disc many times to air his song during the next few days that followed.

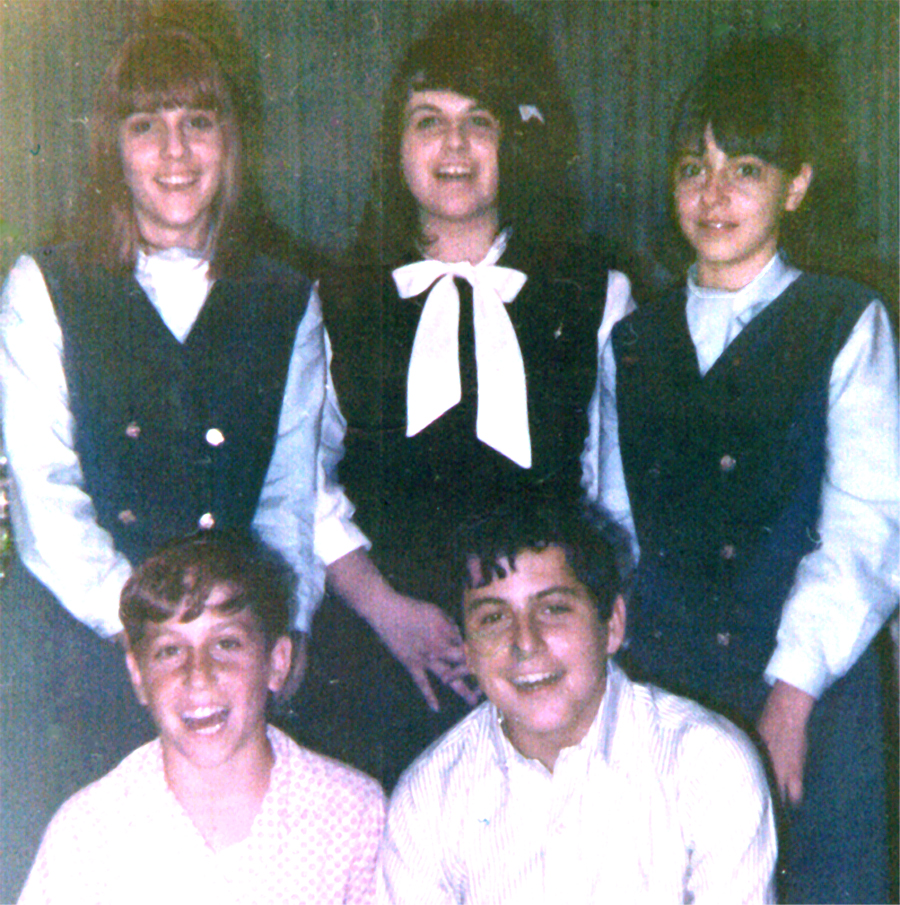
The Scuzzies – Photo from 1965

== Named by Hull ==
Hull inadvertently gave the group their name when he introduced the song for the first time on his radio show as being sung by "The Scuzzy, No Good, Beat-Up, Bad Guys". Hull really meant it as a joke to humor his listeners, and the kids laughed and thought it was funny, so they adopted the name their idol had given them, but shortened it to "The Scuzzies", which was a very unusual group name for that time in music history, but Scuzzies fans seemed to approve of it.

== Hit song recording ==
The Scuzzies finally had their chance to record the "Hullabalooer" song professionally when they were contacted by The Everly Brothers' road manager (Don Wayne), who happened to hear the song being aired one evening the way it was originally recorded at the radio station. So, under the direction of Don Wayne, together with Bob Field, friend and owner of California Recording Studios (CRS Records), and with a local back-up band "The Vibrants", who were the house band at the Cinnamon Cinder Club for Bob Eubanks. Prior to the recording, The Vibrants had consisted of Cassey Van Beek, Armond Frank, Bob Young, Jessy Johnston and Larry Britain. The professional version of "Dave Hull The Hullabalooer" was recorded, finished and pressed before the Christmas holiday season of 1964.

=== Production ===
Both sides of the record which was published through Edm Music, Initial Music were produced by Bob Field who was also of Pacific Record Distributors and Don Wayne.

== Performances ==
As the Scuzzies, the quintet made television appearances on "9th Street West" with Sam Riddle in Hollywood, Los Angeles, California and "TV-8 Dancetime" with Bob Hower in San Diego, California. They were also featured in Bob Eubanks' "Cinnamon Cinder" and Casey Kasem's Clubs. One of the highlights for the Scuzzies in 1965 was when they became the opening act for "Sonny & Cher" at the Grand Opening of "Jamaica West Jr." in Torrance, California.

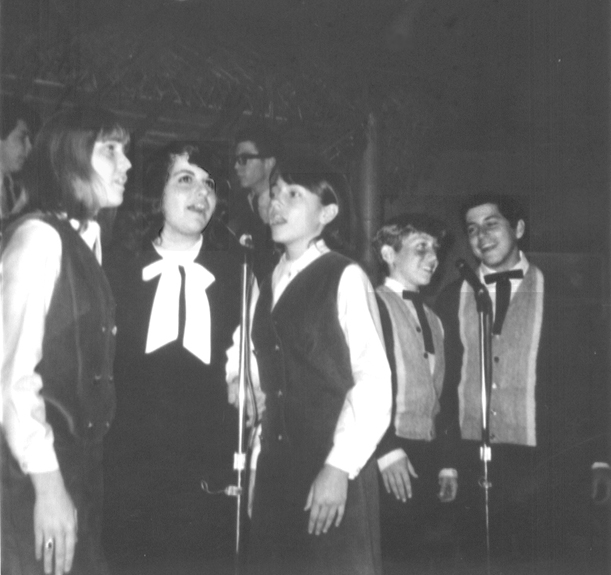
The Scuzzies opening for Sonny & Cher at "Jamaica West Jr." in Torrance, California in 1965

== Beyond the 1960s ==
=== Group ===
In the decades that followed the 1960s, the Cappetta Kids stayed together as a family trio. They would go on to play in Southern California and Las Vegas. Headlining as "The Cappetta Company", throughout the 1970s, the trio was booked in the Reuben's Restaurant chain performing five nights a week. They also showcased in Las Vegas, Nevada in the casinos of The Mint and Hacienda Hotels, and continued to headline in major hotels, restaurants, and night clubs throughout the 1980s and into the early 1990s.

=== Individuals ===
Suzie Cappetta would work and record with various acts including Christian hard rock, R&B group Stevie & the Saints, and Jimmy Ellis. In 1993, Suzie Cappetta, at 44, had a bout with colon cancer. Five years later, she began to have heart problems leading to congestive heart failure, which caused her health to decline more rapidly after the year 2000. Cappetta died on April 13, 2007, at the age of 58.

In 2007, Michael Cappetta joined and currently plays bass and sings in a Los Angeles-based band called The Working Poets.

== Discography ==
Releases
Artist	Title	Release info	Year	Format	Notes #
The Scuzzies with The Vibrants	"Dave Hull The Hullabalooer" / "Our Favourite DJ"	CRS Records CRS-1110	1965	45 RPM single	producers, Bob Field and Don Wayne
The Scuzzies	"A Teenager Feels It Too" / "Our Favorite D. J."	CRS Records CRS-1112	1965	45 RPM single	producers, Bob Field and Don Wayne
The Scuzzies	Dave Hull The Hullabalooer	CRS Records	2007	CD album	
