= Ortlund =

Ortlund is a surname. Notable people with the surname include:

- Anne Ortlund (1923–2013), American evangelical speaker and author
- Gavin Ortlund (born 1983), American theologian and apologist
- Raymond C. Ortlund Sr. (1923–2007), American Presbyterian minister, partner of Anne
- Raymond C. Ortlund Jr. (born 1949), American Presbyterian minister

== See also ==
- Ostlund
