= Ray Ortlund =

Ray Ortlund may refer to:

- Raymond C. Ortlund Sr. (1923–2007), author; pastor of Lake Avenue Congregational Church in Pasadena, California; founder of Renewal Ministries
- Raymond C. Ortlund Jr. (born 1949), author; former pastor of Immanuel Church in Nashville, Tennessee; current director of Renewal Ministries
