= Don Preston (guitarist) =

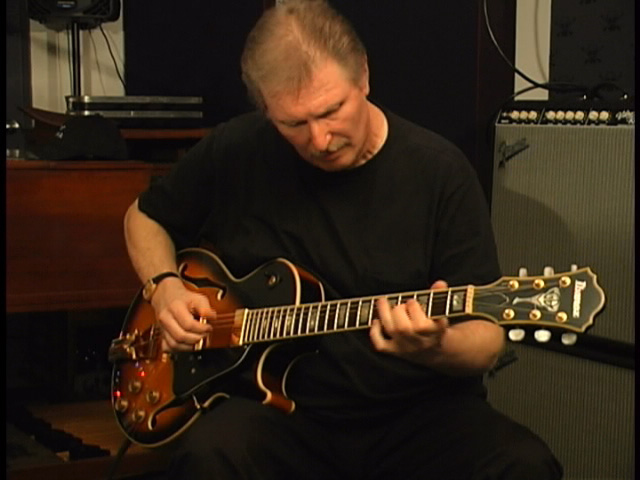
- Preston in the studio

Background information
- Born: September 16, 1942 (age 83); Denver, Colorado, U.S.
- Genres: Rock, blues
- Occupation: Musician
- Instrument: Guitar
- Years active: 1950s–present
- Labels: A&M, Stax, Shelter, DJM

Donald Jack Preston (born September 16, 1942) is an American guitarist, singer and songwriter whose performing career began in the 1950s. He recorded in the 1970s with Leon Russell on Leon Russell and the Shelter People and other albums, and with Joe Cocker on Mad Dogs and Englishmen. He backed Russell at George Harrison's Concert for Bangladesh in August 1971 and appeared in the documentary film and on the live album The Concert for Bangladesh.

== Biography ==
Born in Denver, Colorado, Preston moved to Whittier, California, at age eight. He started playing guitar and sang in the Sewart-Barber Boys Choir as its youngest member. By age 11, he was performing with a youth troupe, the Cactus Kids, singing and playing guitar at store openings, company parties, and USO clubs throughout Southern California.

He took trips to see live broadcasts of TV's Town Hall Party in nearby Compton, California, and his musical style took root in country music, the blues and rock 'n' roll as he was immersed in the diverse pop culture of Southern California during the 1950s.

=== 1950s ===
Preston's early influences included B.B. King, Lowell Fulson, Johnny "Guitar" Watson, and other emerging blues artists heard on late-night AM radio broadcasts. Within a few years, he played the same bills on which they headlined in the Los Angeles area. He also played with many other musical icons in clubs, halls, and historic L.A. venues like El Monte Legion Stadium, with Art Laboe as MC. As a member of the Legion's house band, The Masked Phantoms, and at Harmony Park, he backed hitmakers The Penguins, The Coasters, The Olympics, The Jaguars, Ritchie Valens, The Righteous Brothers, Gene Vincent, Don Julian and the Meadowlarks, and Jessie Hill, among others. Those early experiences influenced his later work, as did guitarists such as Merle Travis, Les Paul, Barney Kessel, Chet Atkins, B.B. King, Albert King, Freddie King, Tommy Crook, Joe Pass, Wes Montgomery, Jimmy Bryant, Billy Butler and Wayne Bennett. He played his first session date at age 16 for Jim Balcom, with Earl Palmer, Plas Johnson, and Barney Kessel.

=== 1960s ===
In the 1960s, Preston's band, Don and the Deacons, played at the popular Cinnamon Cinder, a Studio City club owned by Bob Eubanks. At that time, he also played in the band Cotton Candy that had evolved from another house band called The Vibrants. From there, he joined The Shindogs with Joey Cooper, Chuck Blackwell, and Delaney Bramlett, who had been regulars on the popular TV show Shindig!. In 1966, the Shindogs had a hit single, and they went on the road through the West Coast.

In the late 1950s and 1960s, a number of talented musicians from Oklahoma migrated to Hollywood to make their way in the music business. Among them were Chuck Blackwell, JJ Cale, David Gates, Jim Karstein, Jim Keltner, Jesse Ed Davis, and Leon Russell, whom Preston first met in 1959 while standing in for Cale on guitar with a Southern California bar band.

In the 1960s, Preston recorded two albums on A&M Records, both produced by Gordon Shryock. The first was Bluse (1968), and the second was Hot Air Through A Straw (1968) by Don Preston & The South with Bob Young, Casey Van Beek, and Bobby Cochran. He also recorded an album on Stax Records titled Still Rock (1969), as well as solo albums on Shelter Records. He wrote a song for Three Dog Night, “Circle For A Landing,” which was later used in the Ken Burns documentary The Vietnam War.

=== 1970s ===
In 1970, Preston, appearing as "The Gentle Giant," joined an all-star band to back Joe Cocker for a celebrated eight-week tour in March to May 1970. Known as Mad Dogs & Englishmen, the band was put together by Leon Russell and Denny Cordell. Performances from the tour were released on film and on a record album.

After Mad Dogs, Preston toured and recorded with Leon Russell's band the Shelter People. He sang and played guitar on the album Leon Russell and the Shelter People, which included the song "Stranger in a Strange Land," co-written by Preston and Russell.

As part of the Leon Russell and Friends ensemble, Preston also appeared in The Homewood Sessions, an unscripted and unrehearsed one-hour TV special on KCET (Los Angeles) that aired in December 1970 and was later rebroadcast on PBS. In 1971 he backed Russell and other musicians at George Harrison's Concert for Bangladesh at Madison Square Garden in New York City.

Preston continued to tour with Russell and appeared on the albums Carney, Leon Live, Stop All That Jazz and Will o' the Wisp. He also played on three albums by the influential Texas blues legend Freddie King.

By 1974, he was fronting his own southern blues/rock band, playing across the country and recording a solo album, Been Here All the Time, on Shelter Records. In 1978, Ricky Nelson took Preston on tour with his Stone Canyon Band.

=== 1980s–1990s ===
During these years, Preston played numerous sessions, concerts, and gigs as a featured, side, and solo artist in the United States, Europe, and Asia. He recorded an album, Sacre Blues (Rag Baby, 1980; DJM Records 1997), which blended the blues with elements of country and rockabilly. He showcased his versatility in the late 1990s, performing in the musical revue It Ain't Nothin' But the Blues at the Crossroads Theater in New Brunswick, New Jersey. The show traced the history of blues music with more than three dozen songs. The theater company later moved to Montgomery, Alabama, for several weeks, after which it played for a year on Broadway in New York City (without Preston) where the musical received a Tony nomination.

=== 2000s on ===
Preston continued to play on sessions and freelance gigs into the new century. In 2002 he went on tour with songwriter/guitar player JJ Cale and his band. In 2003 he reunited with Leon Russell for several U.S. concerts, and in 2005 he joined the blues/rock band Canned Heat for a tour in seven countries in Europe and in the United States. In 2008 Preston contributed guitar and vocals to two songs on A Sideman's Journey by Klaus Voormann, the well-known artist, bassist, and session musician, and in 2013, he sang and played on The Breeze: An Appreciation of JJ Cale, a posthumous tribute to Cale by Eric Clapton and others.

Preston appeared in the movie A Poem Is a Naked Person, filmed from 1972 to 1974 by director Les Blank and released by his son Harrod Blank in 2015 after Blank's death. The film is a documentary about Leon Russell and includes concert and rehearsal footage, some of which includes Preston, as well as material capturing the atmosphere of the times. It was screened in Los Angeles at The Theatre at Ace Hotel in July 2015.

== Personal life ==
Don Preston has been married to his wife, Cheryl, since 1987. He has one step-daughter, Shawna (Halsey) Guilfoyle, with Cheryl, and two sons, Craig Preston and Kevin Preston, from a previous marriage.

== Discography ==
=== Albums ===
- Bluse (A&M, 1968)
- Hot Air Through a Straw (A&M, 1968)
- Still Rock (Stax/Enterprise, 1969)
- Been Here All The Time (Shelter, 1974)
- Sacre Blues (Rag Baby, 1980; DJM, 1997)

=== Singles ===
- "Something You've Got"/"Baby It's You" (A&M, 1968)
- "City Lights"/"I Found Love" (A&M, 1968)
- “(Keep On) San Francisco”/“Free and Easy Day” (Shelter, 1974)
- "What a Friend I Have in Georgia"/"Good Day, My Brother" (Shelter, 1974)
- "A Minor Case of the Blues"/"I'm With You Tonight" (Shelter, 1975)

=== Songs Recorded ===
- “Circle for a Landing” (rec. by Three Dog Night; rec. and written by Don Preston) (TV doc: The Vietnam War)
- “Keep On San Francisco”/“Free and Easy Day” (rec. and written by Don Preston)
- “Oh the Sunshine” (Viens Le Soleil) (rec. by Johnny Hallyday; co-written by Don Preston/J. Cooper)
- “Shades of Doubt” (rec. by The Paris Pilots; co-written by Don Preston/J. Cooper)
- “Stranger in a Strange Land” (rec. by Leon Russell; co-written by Leon Russell/Don Preston) (TV: The Lowdown; Graves; Cold Case; House; ABC World News) (Films: 29th Street; Wonderland; Eye of the Tiger)
- “Acid Annapolis” (rec. by Leon Russell; co-written by Leon Russell/Don Preston)
- “I Found Love” (rec. and written by Don Preston)
- “Do What You Want” (rec. and written by Don Preston)
- “Read Me My Rights” (rec. and written by Don Preston)
- “Looking For My Baby” (rec. and written by Don Preston)
- “Skid Row Blues” (rec. and written by Don Preston) (Film: Everything Blues)
- “The Heart I Broke Was Mine” (rec. and written by Don Preston)

=== Other Recordings ===
Guitar or guitar/vocals on the following releases (partial list):

- The Big Blues Harmonica of Ben Benay (Ben Benay, Capitol 1963)
- "It's The Only Way To Fly" (Jewell Akens, Colgems 1965)
- "Andrea" (The Sunrays, Tower 1966)
- “Who Do You Think You Are?”/"Yes, I'm Going Home" (The Shindogs, Viva 1966)
- "Space Captain" (Joe Cocker, A&M 4/70)
- Joe Cocker and Mad Dogs and Englishmen (A&M 1970)
- "Cry Me a River" (Joe Cocker, A&M 9/70)
- Leon Russell and The Shelter People (Shelter 1971)
- "Bangla-Desh"/“Deep Blue” (George Harrison, Apple 7/71)
- The Concert for Bangladesh (Apple 1971)
- Getting Ready (Freddie King, Shelter 1971)
- Carney (Leon Russell, Shelter 1972)
- The Texas Cannonball (Freddie King, Shelter 1972)
- I Can See Clearly Now (O'Neal Twins, Shelter 1972)
- Leon Live (Leon Russell, Shelter 1973)
- Woman Across the River (Freddie King, Shelter 1973)
- Stop All That Jazz (Leon Russell, Shelter 1974)
- Will o' the Wisp (Leon Russell, Shelter 1975)
- Live at the Sweetwater Café (Jimmy Rabbitt, 1978)
- Closer to You (J.J. Cale, Virgin 1994)
- Retrospective (Leon Russell, The Right Stuff/EMI 1997)
- A Sideman's Journey (Klaus Voorman, Universal 2008) 2011 Grammy nominee
- The Best of Leon Russell (Leon Russell, Capitol/EMI 2011)
- The Breeze: An Appreciation of JJ Cale (Eric Clapton & Friends, Bushbranch/Surfdog 2014)
