= Cappetta =

Cappetta is a surname. Notable people with the surname include:

- Gary Michael Cappetta (born 1952), American professional wrestling ring announcer, author, and voice over artist
- Henri Cappetta (1946–2024), French ichthyologist
- Suzie Cappetta (1948–2007), American pop musician
