= Richard Martinez =

Richard Martinez may refer to:

- Richard Martinez (politician) (born 1953), New Mexico state senator
- Richard Martinez (footballer) (born 1988), American-born Puerto Rican footballer
- Oz Fox (Richard Alfonso Martinez), lead guitarist of Stryper
- Richard Martinez (musician), L.A drummer and GM of Music is Hope Foundation
- President Richard Martinez, a character in Cory in the House
- Richard Martinez (music producer), see Sphere
