= Live in Japan (Leon Russell album) =

1975 album by Leon Russell

Studio album by Leon Russell
- Released: 1975
- Recorded: 1971 and November 8, 1973
- Venues: Budokan in Japan and Sam Houston Coliseum
- Genres: Rock and roll; gospel; funk
- Length: 79:39
- Label: Shelter Records
- Producer: Leon Russell

Leon Russell chronology
Stop All That Jazz (1974)	Live in Japan (1975)	Will O' the Wisp (1975)

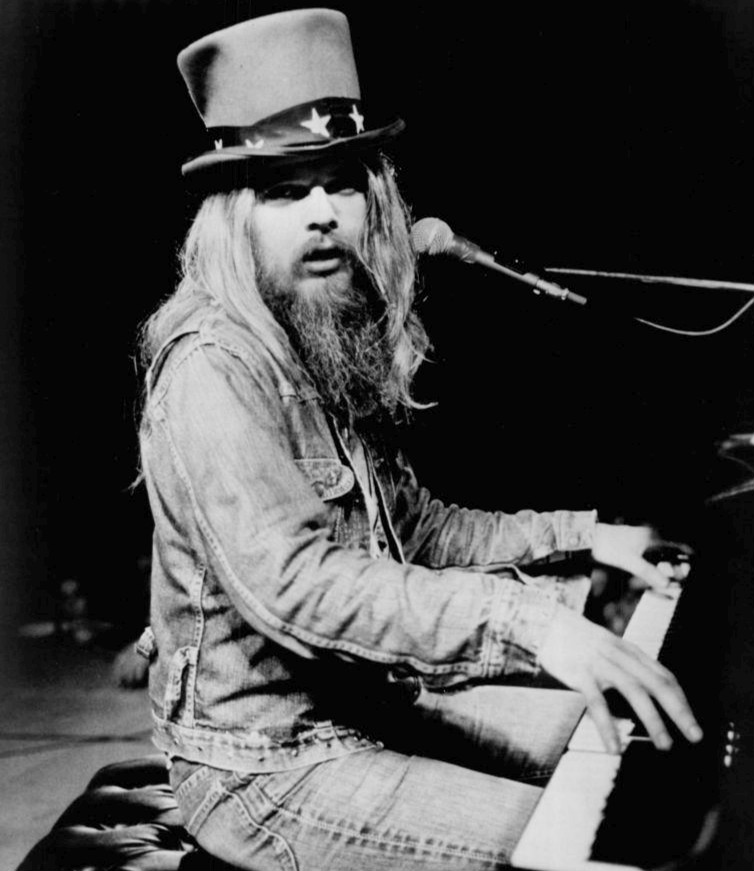
Leon Russell in 1973, Shelter Records file photo

Professional ratings
Review scores
Source	Rating
Allmusic	4/5 stars

Live in Japan is a live album by singer and songwriter Leon Russell. The album was recorded two live tour sessions. The first record section is a 1973 tour show at Budokan in Japan on November 8, 1973. The second recorded section is from a 1971 tour show in Sam Houston Coliseum. While the album had some of Leon's new hits, like "Tight Rope" and "A Song for You," the album did not chart in the top 200. His early live album Leon Live peaked at #9 on the U.S. charts. The album was first released as a vinyl LP by Shelter Records. Live in Japan was re-released on CD by Omnivore Recordings in 2011 and again in 2013 with bonus tracks. The album was by produced by Leon Russell, Nobuya Itoh, Peter Nicholls and Denny Cordell. The new CD releases were after Leon recordings earned six gold records. He received two Grammy Awards from seven nominations. In 2011, he was inducted into both the Rock and Roll Hall of Fame and the Songwriters Hall of Fame. One of his biggest early fans, Elton John, said Russell was a "mentor" and an "inspiration". They recorded their album The Union in 2010, which earned them a Grammy nomination.

== Track listing ==
All tracks composed by Leon Russell except as noted below.

- Tracks 1–9: Recorded live in Japan, November 1973.
- Bonus tracks 10–16: Recorded live in Houston, April 1971.
1. Heaven (Patrick Henderson) - 4:56
2. Over the Rainbow / God Put a Rainbow (Harold Arlen / E.Y. "Yip" Harburg) - 5:39
3. Queen of the Roller Derby - 1:49
4. Roll Away the Stone (with Greg Dempsey) - 4:03
5. Tight Rope - 2:58
6. Sweet Emily - 3:23
7. Alcatraz - 4:04
8. You Don't Have to Go (Jimmy Reed) - 2:34
9. A Song for You / Of Thee I Sing / Roll in My Sweet Baby's Arms (with Don Preston / Lester Flatt) - 7:10
10. Alcatraz - 4:49
11. Stranger in a Strange Land (with Don Preston) - 4:51
12. Groupie (Superstar) (with Bonnie Bramlett) - 3:54
13. Roll Over Beethoven (Chuck Berry) - 3:52
14. Blues Power / Shoot Out on the Plantation / As the Years Go Passing By / The Woman I Love (with Eric Clapton / Deadric Malone / B.B. King / Joe Josea) - 11:08
15. Jumpin' Jack Flash (Mick Jagger / Keith Richards) - 4:54
16. Of Thee I Sing / Yes I Am - 9:35
- vocal on track #1: Rev. Patrick Henderson and Black Grass
- vocal on track #12: Kathi McDonald
- vocal on track #14c: Claudia Lennear
- vocal on track #14d: Don Preston

== Personnel ==
- Leon Russell - Piano, Vocals, Producer, Quotation Author
- Chuck Blackwell - Drums
- Ambrose Campbell - Congas
- Joey Cooper - Rhythm Guitar, Vocals (Background)
- John Gallie - Organ
- Wayne Perkins - Lead Guitar, Vocals (Background)
- Carl Radle - Bass Guitar
- Rev. Patrick Henderson - Piano, Vocals, Liner Notes
- Delrose Allen - Vocals (Background)
- Carolyn Cook - Vocals (Background)
- Nettie Davenport - Vocals (Background)
- Charlene Foster - Vocals (Background)
- Nobuya Itoh - Producer
- Peter Nicholls - Producer
- Denny Cordell - Producer
- Cheryl Pawelski - Reissue Producer
- Suenori Fukui - Engineer, Remixing
- Rueben Cohen - Mastering
- Gavin Lurssen - Mastering
- Lyn Fey - Liner Notes
- Steve Todoroff - Liner Notes
- Takashi Kitazawa - Director
- Audrey Bilger - Project Assistant
- Steven Casper - Project Assistant
- Harvey Drivian - Project Assistant
- Cory Hillis - Project Assistant
- Lee Lodyga - Project Assistant
- Nikki Nieves - Project Assistant
- Bradford Rosenberger - Project Assistant
- Jun Miyajima - Photography
- Jan Persson - Photography
- Greg Allen - Art Direction, Design
- Masao Ohgiya - Design
