= The Diamond Head Game =

- Created by: Ed Fishman; Randall Freer
- Presented by: Bob Eubanks
- Announcer: Jim Thompson
- Country of origin: United States
- No. of episodes: 130

Production
- Running time: 30 minutes
- Production company: Fishman-Freer Productions

Original release
- Network: Syndicated (daily)
- Release: January 6 – July 4, 1975

The Diamond Head Game is an American game show that aired from January 6 to July 4, 1975, in five-day-a-week syndication. Borrowing its name from a long dormant volcano on the island of Oahu, the series was hosted by Bob Eubanks and assistant Jane Nelson, and is the only game show ever to have been taped entirely on location in Hawaii. Alan Thicke composed the theme music.

== Premise ==
The Diamond Head Game had two formats. The first format was used for the first 13 weeks.

=== Format #1 ===
==== Front game ====
The audience was divided into four sections, each representing "one of the islands of Hawaii." Two contestants were selected from each section at a time to compete in a best-of-three faceoff for the right to play the second round. Eubanks asked a series of general knowledge toss-ups that were either true/false or multiple choice. Buzzing in with a correct answer earned a player a point, but answering incorrectly gave the point to the opponent. The first to score two points advanced to the next round and the process was repeated with the other three sections of the audience.

In the second round, the four remaining contestants stood at the bottom of a three-step podium referred to as the base of Diamond Head. In this round, the contestants had to recall items from a list of twelve read by Eubanks. One at a time the contestants took turns giving answers, stopping only when either one of them answered incorrectly, failed to answer within three seconds or (in rare cases) completing the list. The first player to miss was eliminated from the game and the other three won $50. If a list was completed without a miss, all four players won $50 and a new list was played.

On the second step, one more player was eliminated, the two survivors won $100 and faced off for a chance to face the money volcano in the bonus round. One last list was played with the last player standing winning the game. All contestants kept their winnings.

==== Money Volcano ====
In the bonus round, the contestant was given 15 seconds inside a modified wind tunnel called "The Money Volcano." There were various prize cards and cash in the Volcano and the contestant wore a pouch around his/her waist into which these items were placed as they were plucked out of the air. The contestants were not permitted either to bend down to pick the items up or use their bodies to trap them. Among the dollar amounts in the Money Volcano was a $10,000 bill, and there were several $1 bills as well, which the contestants were told should not be collected.

When time expired, the contestant came out of the Volcano and Eubanks pulled out up to ten of the items from the pouch. One at a time, he revealed them to the contestant and as long as a $1 bill was not one of them, the contestant had an option to stop and take a bailout prize or keep going. Any $1 bills drawn from the pouch would cause the contestant to lose everything.

=== Format #2 ===
The second format began on April 7, 1975 and continued for the rest of the series.

==== Front game ====
Two teams of three contestants competed in three question-and-answer rounds. A category was announced, along with five possible answers. Eubanks read a statement and the teams tried to match one of the answers to the statement. Each contestant had their own buzzer. A correct answer earned their team points (10 in round 1, 20 in round 2, and 30 in round 3), while an incorrect answer or failure to respond allowed the opposing team to answer (conferring was allowed here).

The team with the most points after three rounds advanced to the base of Diamond Head and competed against each other for the right to play the Money Volcano; ties, if any, were broken by sudden-death round. In this part of the game, anything other than a right answer earned a player a strike and two strikes eliminated a player.

==== Money Volcano ====
The first half of the game was played as before. However, Eubanks drew a maximum of only five bills and offered opportunities for the contestant to quit and keep their current winnings, or trade for one of five bonus envelopes. Three of the envelopes concealed $100, another $5,000 and the fifth a grand prize. As before, any $1 bill drawn immediately resulted in the contestant losing everything, which ended the bonus round.

== Reception ==
Later in his career, during the period when he was hosting Card Sharks, Eubanks admitted on-camera during the February 19th, 1988 episode that he had not formed any positive memories of having hosted The Diamond Head Game. "It was the worst piece of 'boop boop' that anyone had ever witnessed!" Eubanks said it was the show he was most ashamed of doing. "Didn't hurt my career... I didn't work for years after that," Eubanks joked.

== Episode status ==
All episodes exist. The series was rerun on GSN from October 1997 to April 1998 and again in 2000-2001.
