= Haven of Rest =

Christian radio program

- Haven Today Logo
- Country of origin: United States
- Languages: English, Spanish
- Starring: David Wollen
- Created by: Paul Myers
- Original release: March 16, 1934
- Website: haventoday.org

Haven Today is a national broadcast Christian radio program in the USA. The radio program was founded in 1934 as The Haven of Rest by Paul Myers, who became a radio personality known for Christian ministry. The program has had five hosts: Myers, Paul Evans, Raymond C. Ortlund Sr., Charles Morris, and David Wollen. The daily broadcast is currently on over 600 stations in North America and overseas.

== History ==
Prior to founding his ministry, Paul Myers was a Los Angeles radio personality and station manager. He credited the founding of Haven to hitting rock bottom: kicked out by his wife and passed out on a beach during a drunken bender, he was awakened by a ship's bell; back at his hotel, he opened a Gideon Bible and felt called to ministry. After returning to his wife and family, he was back on Los Angeles airwaves on KHJ (AM), and in 1934 started the radio broadcast The Haven of Rest on KMPC. Myers gave the show a nautical theme, hosting under the name "First Mate Bob" and starting each show with a ships’ air horn, Eight Bells, and an in-house quartet singing 1890 hymn “The Haven of Rest."

Myers retired in 1971 and turned the program over to Pastor Paul Evans, who hosted the show until 1981. In 1981, Evans was replaced by Dr. Raymond C. Ortlund Sr., the former long-time Senior Pastor at Lake Avenue Congregational Church in Pasadena, California, where he had broadcast services over KRLA. By 1988, the Haven of Rest was on 275 stations. Ortlund hosted the Haven of Rest radio broadcast from 1981 to 2000. Ortlund also served as a teaching pastor at Mariner's Church in Newport Beach, California in the 1980s. In 2008, Ortlund was inducted into the National Religious Broadcasters Hall of Fame for his years of hosting the Haven of Rest. In 2000, the program was taken over by Charles Morris, a former news reporter and editor for United Press International who also worked as press secretary for two former U.S. Senators. Morris changed the program's name to Haven Today and replaced the live in-house quartet with contemporary Christian music in 2001. Morris has co-authored several books with Janet Morris, his wife, including Saving a Life, Jesus in the Midst of Success, and Missing Jesus.

The Haven of Rest broadcast moved to a new station about every 2 years: KNX (AM), KHJ (AM), KMPC, then the KFI AM studio in Los Angeles, then the NBC Blue Network and NBC Red Network.

== Haven of Rest historical building ==
In 1941, Paul Myers commissioned a nautical-themed two-story building at 2432 Hyperion Avenue in the Silver Lake District of Los Angeles for the Haven of Rest broadcast. In 1998, the Haven program moved out of the nautical building to Costa Mesa, California, then to Riverside, California. On December 5, 2007 the building was awarded site number 897 on the Los Angeles Historic-Cultural Monuments list for its unique architecture. The building has porthole windows, gangway ramp and promenade deck hand rails. The interior studio was equipped with a pipe organ for the program.

== Present day ==
David Wollen is the host of Haven Today. The thirty-minute program is a mix of Christian music, biblical teachings, interviews and a discussion of current events. The program airs 5 days a week on over 600 stations in North America. In addition to the radio program, Haven Today continues to publish a devotional guide called The Anchor Daily, founded by former host Pastor Paul Evans in the 1970s.

== Haven Quartet ==
The Haven of Rest Quartet was started in 1934, the same year that the radio program began. Referred to on air as the "Crew of the Good Ship Grace," the group performed traditional hymns and gospel songs a cappella or with organ accompaniment. From 1934 until the 1950s, all songs were performed live on air. With the addition of their own ship-like recording studio and modern tape recorders in the 1950s, the quartet started to record their songs in advance for playback on the show.

In the 1980s, the group began to incorporate a more contemporary sound, but it still lagged behind the most popular trends in contemporary Christian and worship music. A name change to The Haven Quartet in 1989 failed to increase the group's recognition beyond its established audience. By 2003, the quartet was no longer consistently included on the radio broadcast.

Members of the quartet and accompanists since its inception included:

- Ernie Payne, bass singer (1934-1975)
- Lorin Whitney, organist (1934-1958)
- Bob Bowman, baritone (1934-)
- Charles Turner, second tenor (1934-)
- Kenneth Nelson, first tenor (1934-)
- Fred Lindblad (1934-1935, 1941)
- Clarence Soderberg (1936)
- Leonard Fox (1946-)
- Dean McNichols, organist (1958-1985)
- Glenn Shoemaker, bass singer (1975-1998)
- Herman Hosier, bass singer (1955-1970)
- Walt Harrah, tenor
- Randy Crenshaw, tenor
- Bill Cantos
- Jeff Gunn
- Truitt Ford, tenor
- Paul Sandberg, tenor
- Steve Ragsdale, baritone
- Dwayne Condon
- Jim Bergthold, first tenor (1967-1977)
- David Kleinsacker
- Val Hellikson
- Frank Alpers
- Steve Lively
- Scot Wojahn
- Ron Mitchell
- Gene Miller
- Mike Redman

The quartet's discography included the following albums:

- Heartwarming Hymns of the Church (1958)
- Favorites (1961)
- His Name Is Wonderful (1962)
- Glory to His Name (1969)
- Celebration: Christmas with Haven (1978)
- The Music of Haven of Rest: Collector's Edition (1978)
- We're Just the Singers of His Song (1979)
- Leavin' on My Mind (1980)
- Starboard (1983)
- Precious Memories: 50th Anniversary Album (1984)
- Tidings of Joy (1984)
- Sound His Praise (1985)
- Sail On (1987)
- Worthy Is the Lamb (1987)
- Hymn Time at Haven (1988)
- Awesome God (1989)
- Be Ye Holy (1989)
- Christmas with Haven (1989)
- With One Voice (1995)
- A Cappella
- An Acappella Christmas
- A Cappella Hymns
- Anchored
- Best of Christmas by Haven
- Best Of Vol 1
- Best Of Vol 2
- Come Let Us Adore Him
- Coming Home
- Crew of the Good Ship Grace
- Enter In
- Everything's Gonna Be Alright in Christ
- Haven of Rest
- The Hope
- It May Be Today
- The King Is Coming (This was a solo album by Jim Bergthold)
- Shipmates of Song
- So Many Ways To Praise
- Something To Sing About
- Welcome Aboard
- With One Voice

== Hosts ==
Host	Years
Paul Myers	1934–1971
Paul Evans	1971–1981
Raymond C. Ortlund Sr.	1981–2000
Charles Morris	2000–2024
David Wollen	2024–present
