= Lake Avenue Church =

- Lake Avenue Congregational Church
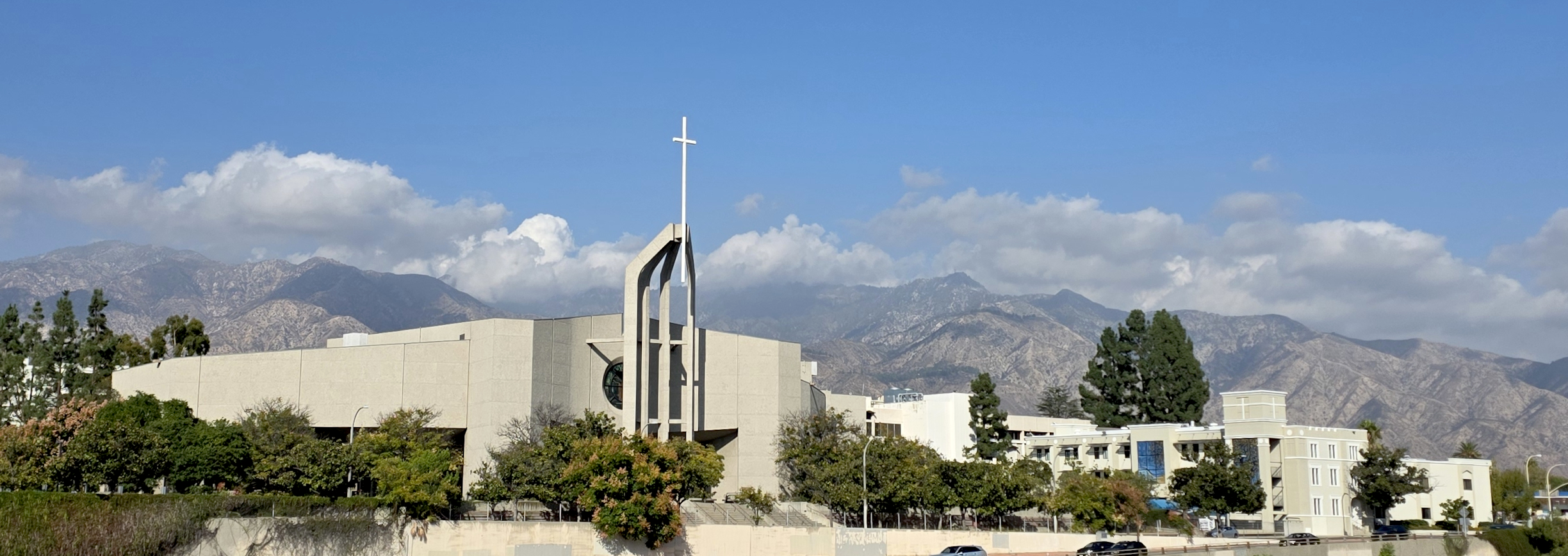
- Lake Avenue Church
- 34°9′10.5″N 118°8′2.8″W
- Location: 393 N. Lake Ave. Pasadena, CA 91101
- Country: United States
- Denomination: Conservative Congregational Christian Conference
- Churchmanship: Congregational
- Website: www.lakeave.org

History
- Status: Church
- Founded: 1896

Architecture
- Functional status: Active
- Architect(s): Barasch Architects & Associates
- Style: Late Modern
- Completed: 1989

Lake Avenue Congregational Church, commonly known and branded as Lake Avenue Church, is an evangelical Protestant congregation at 393 N. Lake Avenue in Pasadena, California. It is affiliated with the Conservative Congregational Christian Conference.

== Music ==
The church’s services have both traditional and contemporary music styles. The sanctuary itself was designed with concert-level acoustics and a 7,000-pipe organ,

== Ties with Fuller Theological Seminary ==
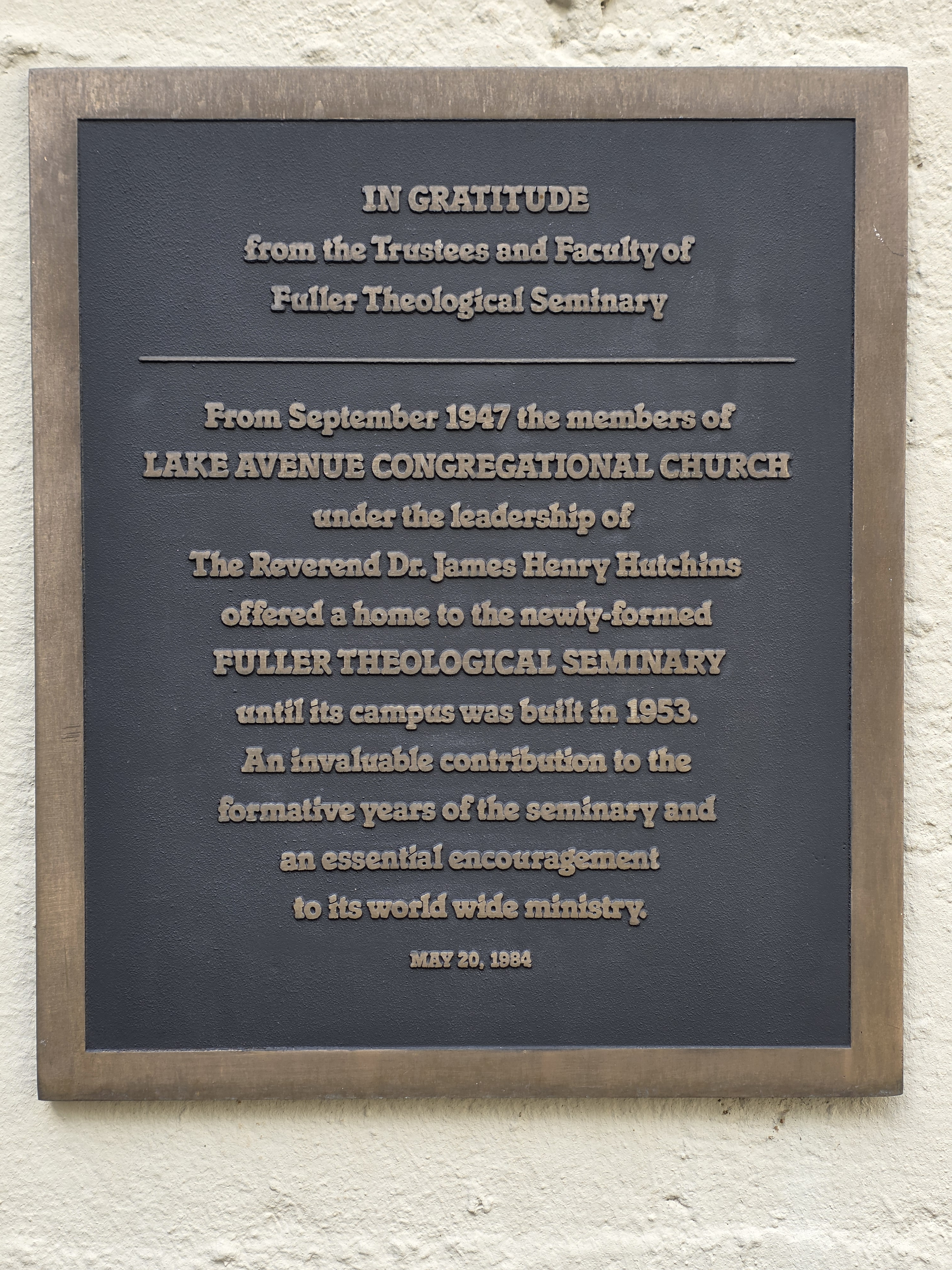
Plaque from Fuller Theological Seminary

Charles E. Fuller joined Lake Avenue Church in 1933 and became friends with the Senior Pastor James Henry Hutchins, a graduate of the Moody Bible Institute. Hutchins kept the church away from the Liberal Christianity that was common in Congregationalism at the time. Fuller held its first classes in the Sunday School rooms of Lake Avenue Church. According to C. Peter Wagner, many members of the Fuller faculty and some Board Members were members of the church, including Wagner himself who would be ordained by the church's denomination.

== Notable ministers ==
- Raymond C. Ortlund Sr. – hosted radio program The Haven of Rest
- Paul Cedar – former President of Evangelical Free Church of America
- John Piper – ordained at Lake Avenue Church
