= A Sideman's Journey =

Studio album by Klaus Voormann & Friends
- Released: 7 July 2009
- Recorded: 2008–2009
- Genres: Rock, pop
- Length: 37:33
- Label: Universal
- Producer: Klaus Voormann

Singles from A Sideman's Journey
- 1. "The Day the World Gets 'Round" Released: January 2009

A Sideman's Journey is the first solo album by German musician and artist Klaus Voormann, released in July 2009. Voormann is best known as the creator of the cover art for The Beatles' album Revolver as well as for being a much-in-demand session musician during the 1970s. He played bass on a large number of well-known albums by ex-Beatles John Lennon, George Harrison and Ringo Starr − including All Things Must Pass, Imagine and The Concert for Bangladesh − and by artists such as Harry Nilsson, Doris Troy, Lou Reed, Gary Wright, Carly Simon and Randy Newman. Before then, Voormann had been a member of the 1960s pop group Manfred Mann. A Sideman's Journey is notable for including performances by Paul McCartney, Ringo Starr and Yusuf Islam (Cat Stevens), among others.

== Contributors ==
The album features cameos by musicians Voormann had worked with in the past, as well as remakes of songs that he contributed to back in the late '60s and the '70s. Three songs by his late friend George Harrison are included, as is a track Voormann co-wrote with soul singer Doris Troy for the latter's 1970 album on The Beatles' Apple label. Paul McCartney sings and plays all instruments except bass guitar on the opening track, "I'm in Love Again", with additional drumming by Ringo Starr. Yusuf Islam (formerly known as Cat Stevens) sings and plays guitar on "All Things Must Pass" and "The Day the World Gets Round". Bonnie Bramlett provides vocals on "My Sweet Lord" and "So Far". Ringo Starr plays drums on two of the tracks, but he declined an offer to sing his trademark song, "You're Sixteen"; Voormann instead selected a younger singer (Max Buskohl) to do the vocals, and to ensure that A Sideman's Journey would include musicians from all age groups. Most of Voormann's old band Manfred Mann now performing as The Manfreds, re-recorded their 1968 hit single "The Mighty Quinn".

== Track listing ==
1. "I'm in Love Again" (feat. Paul McCartney and Ringo Starr) (Dave Bartholomew, Fats Domino) – 2:05
2. "Blue Suede Shoes" (feat. Don Preston) (Carl Perkins) – 3:07
3. "All Things Must Pass" (feat. Yusuf Islam) (George Harrison) – 3:02
4. "Have You Seen My Baby" (feat. John Fohl) (Randy Newman) – 5:12
5. "My Sweet Lord" (feat. Bonnie Bramlett) (Harrison) – 3:35
6. "The Mighty Quinn" (feat. The Manfreds) (Bob Dylan) – 3:06
7. "Short People" (feat. Don Preston) (Randy Newman) – 3:13
8. "The Day the World Gets 'Round" (feat. Yusuf Islam) (Harrison) – 2:47
9. "So Far" (feat. Bonnie Bramlett) (Doris Troy, Voormann) – 3:41
10. "You're Sixteen" (feat. Max Buskohl and Ringo Starr) (Sherman/Sherman) – 2:39
11. "Such a Night" (feat. Dr. John) (Mac Rebennack) 5:52

Deluxe edition (CD):
The asterisk marks an added song

1. "I'm in Love Again" (feat. Paul McCartney and Ringo Starr) (Dave Bartholomew, Fats Domino) – 2:05
2. "So Far" (feat. Bonnie Bramlett) (Doris Troy, Voormann) – 3:41
3. "Blue Suede Shoes" (feat. Don Preston) (Carl Perkins) – 3:07
4. "All Things Must Pass" (feat. Yusuf Islam) (George Harrison) – 3:02
5. "Have You Seen My Baby" (feat. John Fohl) (Randy Newman) – 5:12
6. "My Sweet Lord" (feat. Bonnie Bramlett) (Harrison) – 3:35
7. "The Mighty Quinn" (feat. The Manfreds) (Bob Dylan) – 3:06
8. "Short People" (feat. Don Preston) (Randy Newman) – 3:13
9. "The Day the World Gets 'Round" (feat. Yusuf Islam) (Harrison) – 2:47
10. "Mocking Bird" (feat. Bonnie Bramlett & Don Nix)*
11. "Just Like a Woman" (feat. The Manfreds)*
12. "You're Sixteen" (feat. Max Buskohl and Ringo Starr) (Sherman/Sherman) – 2:39
13. "Such a Night" (feat. Dr. John) (Mac Rebennack) 5:52
14. "He Needs Me" (feat. Inara George) (Harry Nilsson)*

Deluxe edition bonus DVD:

1. "Making Of - A Spectacular Recording Session With More Than 30 Artists" (70 min.)
2. "Voormann & Friends for Charity - Water is Life"
3. "With A Little Help From My Friend Gregor"

== Personnel ==
=== Musicians ===
- Klaus Voormann – bass guitar, backing vocals, liner notes, upright bass, design
- Bonnie Bramlett – vocals
- Max Buskohl – vocals, backing vocals
- Carl Carlton – acoustic guitar, electric guitar, backing vocals, slide guitar
- Mike D'Abo – organ, vocals
- Cassiano De Sa – acoustic guitar, electric guitar
- Dr. John – piano, vocals
- John Fohl – electric guitar, vocals
- Grant Geissman – acoustic guitar, electric guitar
- Kelvin Holly – electric guitar
- David Hood – bass guitar
- Mike Hugg – piano
- Yusuf Islam – acoustic guitar, vocals, backing vocals
- Jackie Johnson – backing vocals
- Paul Jones – backing vocals
- Jim Keltner – drums
- Trevor Lawrence – saxophone
- Albert Lee – electric guitar
- Susan Marshall – backing vocals
- Paul McCartney – organ, acoustic guitar, piano, drums, electric guitar, vocals
- Tom McGuinness – electric guitar, backing vocals
- Van Dyke Parks – piano, keyboards
- Luke Potashnick – acoustic guitar, electric guitar, backing vocals
- Steve Potts – drums
- Don Preston – electric guitar, vocals
- Kristoffer Sonne – percussion, drums, backing vocals
- Ringo Starr – drums
- Rick Steff – organ, piano, accordion, electric piano
- Nikolaj Torp Larsen – keyboards, backing vocals
- Rob Townsend – drums
- Ruscha Voormann – backing vocals
- Joe Walsh – electric guitar
- Joel Williams – drums

=== Additional Personnel ===
- Maryann Baker – assistant engineer
- Adam Hill – engineer
- Iain Hill – engineer
- Thomas Juth – mixing
- Jamie Kirkham – engineer
- Eddie Klein – engineer
- Jason Latshaw – engineer
- Adam Miller – assistant engineer
- Kevin Nix – mastering
- Larry Nix – mastering
- Rich Niles – engineer
- Lee Slater – engineer
- Christina Voormann – liner notes
- Stefan Zaradic – engineer
