= Cinnamon Cinder =

Nightclub chain in California, U.S.

- Location: California
- Owner: Bob Eubanks, Mickey Brown, Stan Bannister, Roy Bannister
- Type: Nightclub
- Events: Rock and roll, Rock music

Construction
- Opened: 1960s

The Cinnamon Cinder was a chain of Southern California nightclubs owned by Bob Eubanks. Acts that appeared in the clubs included the Coasters, the Drifters, Sonny & Cher, Buffalo Springfield, Ike & Tina Turner, and the Shirelles.

== Background ==
The Cinnamon Cinder came about to fill a need for teenagers and young adults who were either too young or could not afford the entry to regular night clubs. The clubs were located in Southern California. Bob Eubanks, the chain's owner was a Los Angeles disc jockey and game host. He hosted The Newlywed Game. He had partners and one of them was former L.A. policeman Mickey Brown and Van Nuys skating rink owners, Stan Bannister and Roy Bannister.

The original location on Ventura Boulevard had previously housed Grace Hayes' Lodge and then Larry Potter's Supper Club, "featuring first class food and drink, as well as top-notch jazz, R&B and early rock-and-roll groups."

Acts like the Righteous Brothers and Stevie Wonder were booked for the clubs at North Hollywood and Long Beach. A television show called The Cinnamon Cinder Show originated from the clubs. There was also a hit record called "Cinnamon Cinder" which was recorded by The Pastel Six and The Cinders. It was also recorded by a band called The Hartung Sounds.

There were strict rules for the customers. The dress code discouraged the wearing of blue jeans, capris or shorts. Alcohol was not permitted, and if a person showed signs of being under the influence, they would be turned away. Any adults, such as parents that came in to check on their children, would have to be accompanied by a member of the opposite sex. This was to stop older men coming in with the intention of preying on younger girls.

== House bands ==
Cotton Candy

Cotton Candy consisted of former Vibrants drummer Bob Young and other members, Joey Cooper on guitar, Don Preston on guitar and John Gallee an organist and bassist. It was set up by Casey Van Beek who was with The Vibrants. Preston, Cooper and Gallee would later end up writing for singer Johnny Hallyday.

Don and the Deacons

Don and the Deacons were the house band at the club and started around November 1964. Preston would also play in Cotton Candy. Don Preston, “Don and the Deacons” and Al Ferguson traded lead guitar rolls while Dave played Drums and Bill on Base. Don and the Deacons along with the Vibrents opened for the first USA Rolling Stones concert in Long Beach California. Once in a while at the end of the night, Don and Al would go up to Leon Russel's home in the hills of Encino to hang out. Leon and Joe Cocker were putting together a band supported by its member's referred to as the Shelter People. When the Cinnamon Cinder gig ended, Don Preston went on the Road with Joe Cocker, “Mad Dog’s and Englishmen”. Al Ferguson then joined “The Hondells” and toured Europe including a USO tour in Vietnam.

The Roosters

Among the house bands that played at the San Diego venue was The Roosters who were formed around 1965. The group's leader was multi-instrumentalist Richard "Dick" Purchase. He played bass, guitar, and keyboards. He was also an accomplished trumpet player. The rest of the band members were guitarists Joe Gonzalez and Bobby Hijer. The drummer was Sid Smith. In 1967 Smith left the band and was replaced by Jack Pinney. Pinney would later go on to become the drummer for Iron Butterfly. Later after a good part of a decade at the venue, they were let go by the club. They were possibly fired because of a later member Jerry Raney.

The Vibrants

The house band for the Traffic Circle Cinnamon club was The Vibrants. They backed The Scuzzies on the Suzie Cappetta composed 1965, local top 40 hit "Dave Hull The Hullabalooer". The group had consisted of Cassey Van Beek (a.k.a. Casey Van Beek), Armond Frank, Bob Young, Jessy Johnston and Larry Brittain. By December 1966, the band which was led by Van Beek had been at the club for five years. Around September 1967, the group broke up with some of its members returning to college. Van Beek who by this time was 23, set up another house band called Cotton Candy.

The Savoys

Al Ferguson, before “Don and the Deacons”, played lead guitar for the Savoys, sharing the stage with The Vibrants at the Long Beach club. They were the house bands that opened the club. The members of The Savoys band, consisted of Al Ferguson, Hayden Eaves, Mike Drysdale, Craig Schoembaum, Steve Thoth, Bob Westmorland, and Jim Kissling. Al Ferguson, later was with Don Preston of Don and The Deacons, at the North Hollywood Cinnamon Cinder.

== Locations ==
=== Studio City ===
The original Cinnamon Cinder club was located at 11345 Ventura Blvd. It was famously the location of a press conference by The Beatles before the band's Hollywood Bowl concert in 1964.

In 1969, it was bought by Dick Clark and changed its name to the V.I.S. Club, with a country music booking policy, and managed by Jack Nance. Merle Haggard was the first artist booked under the new policy.

=== Long Beach ===
One popular club was at Traffic Circle, 4401 Pacific Coast Highway. Surf band The Pyramids appeared there in the 1960s.

=== San Diego ===
The most southern location of the chain was located at 7578 El Cajon Blvd., La Mesa CA not far from San Diego State University.

=== Other locations ===
In his autobiography It's in the Book, Bob!, Bob Eubanks states that there were also Cinnamon Cinder clubs in Fresno and San Bernardino. The Cinnamon Cinder in Houston was not connected to the California clubs but was named after them.
