= Matchmaker (game show) =

1987 television dating show

- Genre: Game show
- Written by: Bill Armstrong; John Tobyansen
- Directed by: Jeff Goldstein; Arthur Butler-Forrest
- Presented by: Dave Hull; Jimmie Walker (sub-host)
- Announcer: Lou Hunt; Bill Armstrong
- Country of origin: United States

Production
- Producers: Jeff Goldstein; John Tobyansen
- Production companies: Four Star International; Kleinman, Pollard, Hull Productions

Original release
- Network: NBC O&O stations and national syndication
- Release: September 14, 1987 – March 11, 1988

Matchmaker is a dating show that aired in syndication from September 14, 1987, to September 1988. It was hosted by Dave Hull. Jimmie Walker also hosted for one week of shows. The executive producer and occasional announcer was Bill Armstrong, who replaced original announcer Lou Hunt. Syndication was arranged by Four Star International, in association with Kleinman, Pollard, Hull Productions, and Orbis Communications. It was based on a long-running Los Angeles radio show hosted by Dave "The Hullaballoer" Hull where listeners would call in to the radio station and ask him to find them dates. It was fast-paced, tongue-in-cheek, and fueled by Hull's madcap wit and humor. The Matchmaker television show was an adaptation of the radio program. A reboot of the show with an updated format was in the works for 2021 or 2022 by original co-creator, Gary Kleinman, with a new host, Jillian Barberie.

== Gameplay ==
The show began with six potential dates; three men and three women. Hull could not see any of them, nor could they see each other. He did not see any of the potential dates because Hull believed "anyone can make a match by looking at them". He did not even look at the people he eliminated, because they could possibly return on a future episode. The only contestants he ever saw were the ones he successfully matched.

To start the show off, he gave each potential date a miniature interview, asking them about their hobbies and profession. After he talked to all six, Hull eliminated one man and one woman from the show.

He then asked the remaining four people questions about love and romance. After he talked to each one, he eliminated one more person from the show, leaving one person of one gender and two of the other. That one person became the "romantic lead", and Hull would see which of the two remaining would be the best match for them.

The two remaining saw the romantic lead's picture, and Hull asked each one a question about them (for example,"is that what you thought they'd look like?"). Then he asked each one a final question. When the questioning was finished, he picked which one would be the best choice for the romantic lead.

The two remaining would play a bonus round to decide where they would spend their date out of three possible choices. Before the show, each were asked to give lists of likes and dislikes in specific categories (for example, favorite sitcoms or breakfast foods).

Three of those lists would be randomly selected. For the first list, three of the romantic lead's favorites would be shown. If the other person matched at least one item on the list, they continued to the second one, which had only two items. Matching at least one meant they could continue to the final list, which had just one item.

The trip they won depended on how many matches were made. Just one match won the least expensive trip, two matches won the moderately-priced trip, and matching all three won the most expensive trip.
