= Christ Presbyterian Church (Nashville, Tennessee) =

Coordinates: 36.049°N 86.879°W

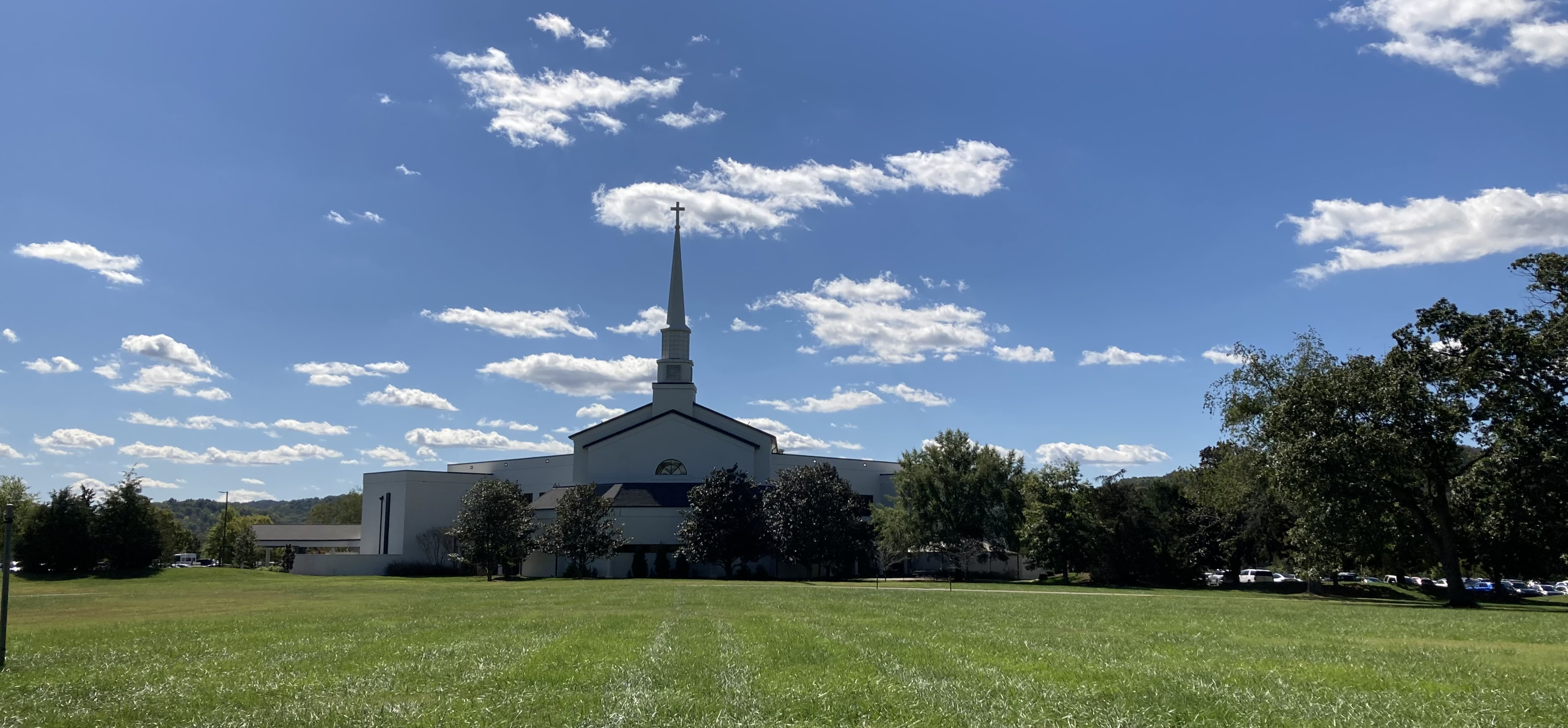
- Christ Presbyterian Church
- Location: 2323 Old Hickory Boulevard; Nashville, Tennessee
- Country: United States
- Denomination: Presbyterian Church in America
- Website: christpres.org

The Christ Presbyterian Church in Nashville, Tennessee, United States, is a Presbyterian Church in America multi-site church with three campuses (Old Hickory Blvd, Music Row, and Cool Springs) with approximately 2,000 total weekly attenders as of 2022.

== History ==
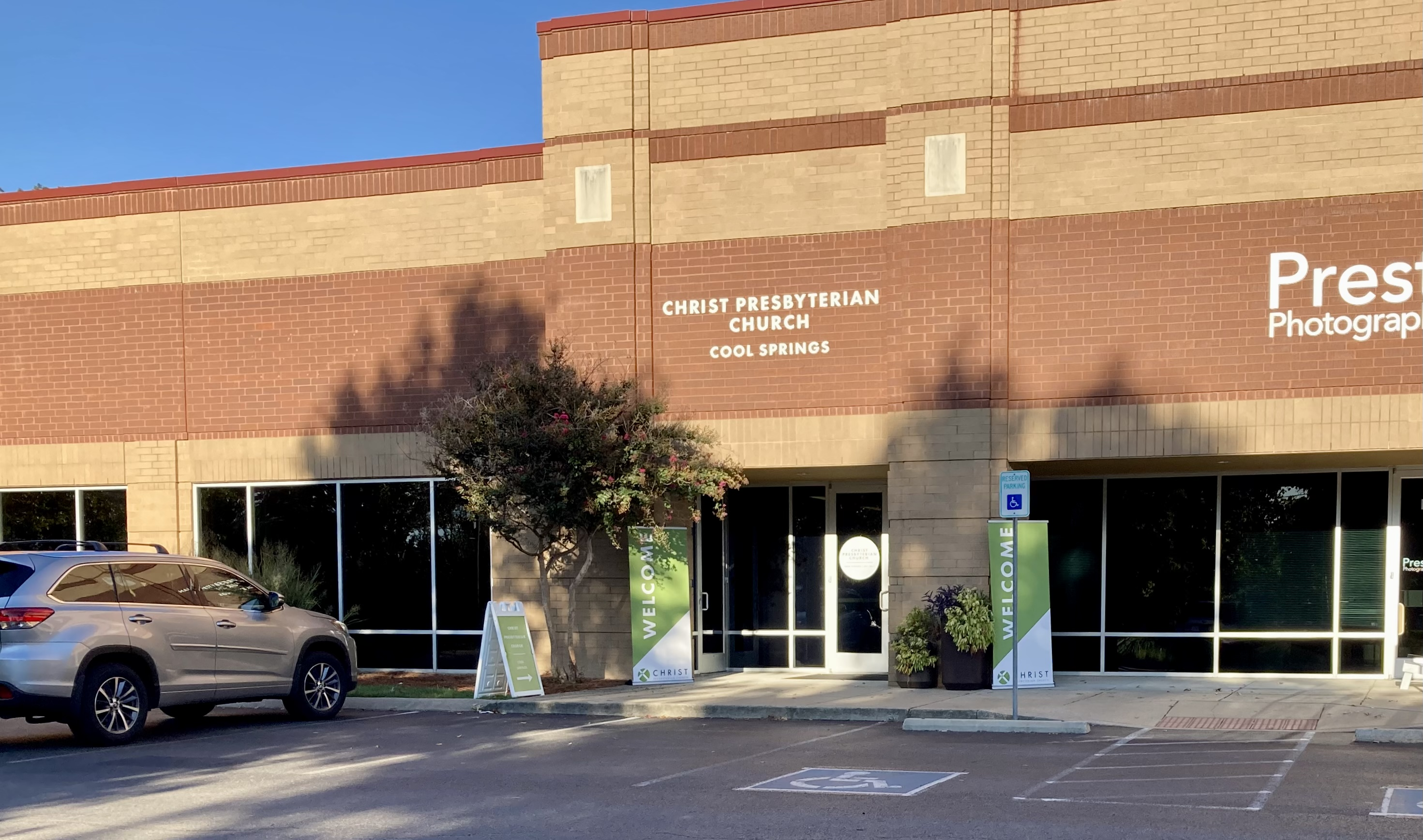
Christ Presbyterian Church's campus in Cool Springs, Tennessee

Cortez Cooper founded Christ Presbyterian Church in Nashville in January 1981. Cooper was previously pastor of the First Presbyterian Church of Nashville, a Presbyterian Church (U.S.A.) affiliated congregation, from 1971 to 1981. Cooper organized Christ Presbyterian as an affiliate of the Presbyterian Church in America, the more theologically conservative of the Presbyterian churches. The current church building was designed to hold 1,500 people, with expansion potential to 2,100 if needed. On its founding date, about 1,000 people gathered to found the church. In spring 1981, the congregation joined the PCA. The church purchased property, the first worship service was held in the new building took place in May 1984. By 1997, the church's five Sunday services drew more than 3,000. In 2004, Christ Presbyterian Church called Raymond C. Ortlund, Jr. as Senior Pastor. Ortlund is a Biblical scholar, theologian, prolific writer and teacher. He served as Senior Pastor until February 2007. In July 2007, Wilson Benton came out of retirement to become the interim Senior Pastor. Benton served as senior pastor of Kirk of the Hills PCA in St. Louis for over twenty years, and at his retirement, the interim Senior Pastor there was Christ Presbyterian's first Pastor, Cortez Cooper. It sponsors the Christ Presbyterian Academy since its founding in 1985. The congregation planted many PCA churches in the Nashville community. Since January 2012, the pastor of Christ Presbyterian has been Scott Sauls. Sauls was previously a pastor at Redeemer Presbyterian Church (New York City) with Tim Keller (pastor). Sauls was chosen to offer the prayer at the inauguration of Governor Bill Haslam. Sauls was placed on indefinite leave in May 2023 following an investigation into his conduct as a leader. In November 2023, Sauls resigned.

== Theology ==
The congregation is a member of the Nashville Presbytery of the PCA. It adheres to the Nicene Creed, the Apostles Creed and Westminster Confession.

== Notable people ==
- Bill Haslam - former Governor of Tennessee.
- Marsha Blackburn - United States senator.
