= Will O' the Wisp (album) =

Studio album by Leon Russell
- Released: April 7, 1975
- Length: 40:06
- Labels: Shelter (US); A&M (UK)
- Producers: Denny Cordell, Leon Russell

Leon Russell chronology
| Live in Japan (1975) | Will O' the Wisp (1975) | Wedding Album (1976) |

Professional ratings
Review scores
| Source | Rating |
|---|---|
| AllMusic | 3.5/5 stars |
| Christgau's Record Guide | C− |

Will O' the Wisp is the sixth studio album by Leon Russell. The album was released in 1975 on Shelter Records. It peaked at No. 30 on the Billboard albums chart and remained on the chart for 40 weeks. The album cover was designed and illustrated by artist/actor Gailard Sartain.

It features the hit single, "Lady Blue", which reached No. 14 on the Billboard Hot 100 singles chart. The album was certified gold in 1976.

On July 21, 1999, Leon performed "Back to the Island" live on The David Letterman Show.

== Track listing ==
All tracks composed by Leon Russell

Side one

1. "Will O' the Wisp" (instrumental) – 0:55
2. "Little Hideaway" – 3:57
3. "Make You Feel Good" – 2:23
4. "Can't Get Over Losing You" – 5:04
5. "My Father's Shoes" – 4:16
6. "Stay Away from Sad Songs" – 4:01

Side Two

1. "Back to the Island" – 5:20
2. "Down on Deep River" – 3:55
3. "Bluebird" – 3:55
4. "Laying Right Here in Heaven" – 2:52
5. "Lady Blue" – 3:28

== Charts ==
| Chart (1975/76) | Peak position |
|---|---|
| Australia (Kent Music Report) | 96 |
| United States (Billboard 200) | 30 |

== Personnel ==
- Leon Russell – lead vocals (all but 1), backing vocals (7), piano (all but 7 and 11), clavinet (1–2, 4, 6, 9), RMI electronic piano (2, 4, 9, 11), organ (5, 7), synthesizer (1–3, 5, 7, 9), lead guitar (6), electric guitar (3), Dobro guitar (6), acoustic guitar (8–9), bass guitar (1–3, 5, 8–9, 11), percussion (1–2, 9), vibraphone (11)
- Roger Linn – synthesizer programming
- Patrick Henderson – organ (10), tambourine (9)
- Steve Cropper – electric guitar (5–7, 11), slide guitar (7)
- J. J. Cale – electric guitar (4)
- Bobby Manuel – electric guitar (6–7, 11)
- Don Preston – electric guitar (10)
- Tommy Allsup – electric guitar solos (8), acoustic guitar (8)
- Masako Hirayama – biwa (4)
- Donald Dunn – bass guitar (6–7)
- Carl Radle – bass guitar (10)
- Teddy Jack Eddy – drums (2–3, 9)
- Al Jackson Jr. – drums (5–7, 11), percussion (7, 11)
- Richard "Moon" Calhoun – drums (8), drum ending (3)
- Carl Himmel – drums (10), percussion (10)
- Jim Keltner – drums (10), percussion (10)
- Ambrose Campbell – drums (10), percussion (10)
- Jim Horn – alto saxophone solo (11)
- Minoru Muraoka – shakuhachi (4)
- Mary McCreary – lead vocals (10), backing vocals (2, 4, 7, 9), tambourine (4)
