= Lady Blue (song) =

1975 single by Leon Russell

Single by Leon Russell

from the album Will O' the Wisp
- B-side: "Laying Right Here in Heaven"
- Released: January 1, 1975
- Genre: Blue-eyed soul
- Length: 3:31
- Label: Shelter
- Songwriter: Leon Russell
- Producers: Denny Cordell; Leon Russell

Leon Russell singles chronology
"If I Were a Carpenter" (1974)	"Lady Blue" (1975)	"Back to the Island" (1976)

"Lady Blue" is the 1975 hit love song by American singer–songwriter Leon Russell. It was a track on his LP album, Will O' the Wisp.

The song reached number 14 on the U.S. Billboard Hot 100 on November 1, 1975.

The song featured a saxophone solo in the instrumental section.

The first live play of the song in a concert was by George Benson on September 30, 1977, at The Roxy in West Hollywood, California. His studio version reached #39 on the U.S. R&B chart in 1978. Edgar Winter and Leon Russell performed Lady Blue live on July 28, 1987, at Hunts in Burlington, Vermont.

== Charts ==
Chart (1975)	Peak position
Canadian RPM Top Singles	44
U.S. Billboard Hot 100	14
