= Hank Wilson's Back Vol. I =

1973 album by Leon Russell

Studio album by Hank Wilson
- Released: September 1973
- Recorded: February 26–28, 1973
- Venues: Bradley's Barn, Mount Juliet, Tennessee
- Studio: Mixing at Ardent Studios
- Genres: Country; bluegrass
- Length: 39:10
- Labels: Shelter (US); A&M (UK)
- Producers: Leon Russell; Denny Cordell; J.J. Cale; Audie Ashworth

Hank Wilson chronology
Leon Live (1973)	Hank Wilson's Back Vol. I (1973)	Stop All That Jazz (1974)

Professional ratings
Review scores
Source	Rating
Allmusic	4.5/5 stars

Hank Wilson's Back Vol. I is an album by singer and songwriter Leon Russell singing as Hank Wilson. The UK edition has a banner printed on the front of the sleeve to the right of Russell's stetson saying "Leon Russell!", presumably as a marketing initiative to promote the album using the strength of Russell's name.

The album was recorded in 1973 at Bradley's Barn in Mount Juliet, Tennessee. The album was mixed at Ardent Studios. The album has classic country and bluegrass tunes and was produced by J. J. Cale, Audie Ashworth, Leon Russell, and Denny Cordell.

Originally released as a vinyl LP, Hank Wilson's Back Vol. I was re-released on CD by DCC Compact Classics in 1990 and again by The Right Stuff Records in 1996.

== Background ==
Leon Russell was born in Oklahoma, had a home in Tulsa, and grew up around country and blues music. After making successful rock albums, touring, and releasing the concert album Leon Live, he returned to his roots under the name of a fictional musical personality: Hank Wilson. Leon Russell and some of his close friends from both Los Angeles and Nashville recorded the honky tonk songs between February 26 and February 28, 1973.

- Leon made a total of four Hank Wilson albums:
  - Hank Wilson's Back Vol. I (1973)
  - Hank Wilson, Vol. II (1984)
  - Legend in My Time: Hank Wilson Vol. III (1998)
  - Rhythm & Bluegrass: Hank Wilson, Vol. 4 (2001)
    - In 2009 Leon released the album Best of Hank Wilson

== Charts ==
Chart (1973/74)	Peak position
Australia (Kent Music Report)	60
United States (Billboard 200)	28

== Track listing ==
Side 1

1. "Roll in My Sweet Baby's Arms" (Lester Flatt) – 4:25
2. "She Thinks I Still Care" (Dickey Lee) – 4:28
3. "I'm So Lonesome I Could Cry" (Hank Williams) – 3:10
4. "I'll Sail My Ship Alone" (Henry Bernard, Morry Burns, Lois Mann, Henry Thurston) – 2:36
5. "Jambalaya (On the Bayou)" (Hank Williams) – 2:49
6. "A Six Pack to Go" (Hank Thompson, Dick Hart, Johnny Lowe) – 2:20

Side 2

1. "The Battle of New Orleans" (Jimmie Driftwood) – 2:38
2. "Uncle Pen" (Bill Monroe) – 2:15
3. "Am I That Easy to Forget" (Carl Belew, Shelby Singleton, W. S. Stevenson) – 2:35
4. "Truck Drivin' Man" (Terry Fell) – 2:11
5. "The Window Up Above" (George Jones) – 3:24
6. "Lost Highway" (Leon Payne) – 2:18
7. "Goodnight Irene" (Huddie Ledbetter, John A. Lomax) – 4:01

Bonus tracks

1. "Hey, Good Lookin'" (Hank Williams) – 2:42
2. "In the Jailhouse Now" (Jimmie Rodgers) – 5:19

== Personnel ==
- Leon Russell – vocals, producer
- David Briggs – piano, backing vocals
- Hargus "Pig" Robbins – piano
- Billy Byrd – electric guitar
- J.J. Cale – electric guitar, producer
- Grady Martin – electric guitar
- Pete Wade – electric guitar
- Billy Sanford – high string guitar, rhythm guitar
- Chip Young – high string guitar
- Dianne Davidson – rhythm guitar, backing vocals
- Ray Edenton – rhythm guitar, backing vocals
- Butch Robins – dobro
- Tut Taylor – dobro
- Curly Chalker – steel guitar
- Pete Drake – steel guitar
- Weldon Myrick – steel guitar
- Hal Rugg – steel guitar
- Bobby Thompson – banjo
- Harold Bradley – bass
- Carl Radle – bass
- Bob Moore – upright bass
- Joe Zinkan – upright bass
- Jerry Carrigan – drums
- Buddy Harman – drums
- Charlie McCoy – harmonica, backing vocals
- Jim Buchanan – fiddle
- Johnny Gimble – fiddle
- Millie Kirkham – backing vocals
- Melba Montgomery – backing vocals
- Audie Ashworth – producer
- Denny Cordell – producer
- Joe Mills – engineer
