= Ray and Anne Ortlund =

American evangelical speaker and author

Raymond C. Ortlund Sr. (July 9, 1923 – July 22, 2007) and Anne Ortlund (December 3, 1923 – November 4, 2013) were American evangelical speakers and authors. Ray was a pastor, author, broadcast host, and Christian speaker who was heard by millions across the nation on the radio program The Haven of Rest. Anne was an organist, author, and hymn composer. Together they founded Renewal Ministries, and wrote numerous books over their years of ministry, including Three Priorities for a Strong Local Church and Up with Worship.

== Education ==
Anne graduated from the University of Redlands, majoring in music. Ray attended North Park University in Chicago, the University of Redlands, and the University of Puget Sound in Tacoma, Washington. While attending, he was captain of two football teams and also was an assistant pastor at four churches. Ray graduated from Princeton Theological Seminary in 1950, and was ordained a Presbyterian minister. At Princeton Seminary, one of his key mentors was Donald Grey Barnhouse.

== Ministry ==
Raymond C. Ortlund Sr.'s first work as a pastor was in Christiana, Pennsylvania, and, following that, at East Glenville Community Church, Glenville, New York. He was part of a two-month pastor exchange program in 1959, when he worked in England. Returning from England, Ray served as senior pastor at Lake Avenue Church in Pasadena, California, from September 1959 to the late 1970s. The Sunday morning services at Lake Avenue Congregational Church were broadcast over radio station KRLA. After 20 years at Lake Avenue, Ray and Anne founded Renewal Ministries, and they traveled around the world teaching about renewal and revival among God's churches. As a special speaker, Ray was a key part of the revival movement at Wheaton College in 1970. He also served as a teaching pastor at Mariner's Church in Newport Beach, California, in the 1980s. For a number of years, Ortlund wrote a weekly column for the Pasadena Star-News called Out of a Pastor's Study.

Anne was the organist for the Old Fashioned Revival Hour radio broadcast with Charles E. Fuller and The Joyful Sound program. In addition to her many books, she wrote a number of hymns, including "Macedonia", which was selected as the theme hymn for Billy Graham's World Congress on Evangelism in Berlin in 1966.

Ray hosted the Haven of Rest radio broadcast (now called Haven Today) from 1989–2000. The National Religious Broadcasters Hall of Fame inducted Ray in 2008 for his years of hosting the program.

== Personal ==
Ray was born in Des Moines, Iowa, to Swedish American parents, and was the youngest of five children. He served in the US Navy in World War II for three and a half years. Ray and Anne met at a prayer group at the University of Redlands in 1944, during a home stay between deployments. After the war, they were married at the Fourth Presbyterian Church in Washington, D.C., and honeymooned in the Shenandoah Valley. Anne was the daughter of U.S. Brigadier General Joseph B. Sweet. Their son Raymond C. Ortlund Jr. took over Renewal Ministries and serves as president of the organization, and served as the founding pastor of Immanuel Church in Nashville, Tennessee. Raymond Ortlund Jr.'s youngest son Gavin Ortlund runs a YouTube apologetics channel called TruthUnites.

== Death ==
Ray died on July 22, 2007, after a long battle with pulmonary fibrosis, a lung disease. Two memorial services were held; one at Saint Andrew's Presbyterian Church in Newport Beach on July 27, 2007, and the second at Lake Avenue Church on July 28, 2007. Anne died in 2013 following several years with kidney disease and bone cancer.

== Books ==
- Lord, Make My Life a Miracle – 1995 (by Ray & Anne)
- You Don't Have To Quit – 1994 (by Ray & Anne)
- In His Presence – 1995 – 3 editions (by Ray & Anne)
- Confident in Christ: Discover Who You Are as a Believer – 1989 (by Ray & Anne)
- Three Priorities for a Strong Local Church – 1988 – 2 editions (by Ray & Anne)
- A Fresh Start for Your Friendships – 2001 (by Ray & Anne)
- Staying Power: How You Can Win In Life's Tough Situations – 1986 (by Ray & Anne)
- A Man and His Loves – 1994 (by Ray & Anne)
- The Best Half of Life: For You at Age 35–And Older: With Built-In Study Guide − 1988 (by Ray & Anne)
- Renewal – 1989 (by Ray & Anne)
- How Great Our Joy – 2000 (by Ray & Anne)
- Love me with tough love: Disciplines for living together in the Body of Christ – 1979 (by Anne)
- Building a great marriage – 1985 (by Anne)
- Discipling One Another – 1983 (by Anne)
- Disciplines of the Home– 1990 (by Anne)
- I Want to See You, Lord – 1998 (by Anne)
- The acts of Joanna – 1982 (by Anne)
- Disciplines of a Beautiful Woman – 1984 (by Anne)
- Disciplines of the Heart: Tuning Your Inner Life to God – 1989 (by Anne)
- Children are Wet Cement – 1981 (by Anne)
- The Gentle Ways of the Beautiful Woman – 1996 (by Anne)
- My Sacrifice His Fire: Weekday Readings for Women – 2001 (by Anne)
- Love Me with Stubborn Love: The Why's and How's of Small Groups – 2000 (by Anne)
- Fix Your Eyes on Jesus – 1991 (by Anne)
- Up with Worship: How to Quit Playing Church – 2001 (by Anne)

== Magazines ==
- "Rx for unfulfilled mothers" (Anne Ortlund), Christian Herald Association, Inc., Feb. 1982

== Essays ==
- "How To Begin Again”, on Ephesians 4:17–32, December 29, 1974

== Articles ==
- Out of a Pastor's Study, a weekly column for the Pasadena Star-News
