= Suzie Cappetta =

American pop musician and songwriter

- Birth name: Susan M. Cappetta
- Born: August 20, 1948
- Died: April 13, 2007 (aged 58)
- Occupation(s): Singer, musician
- Instrument(s): Bass guitar, guitar
- Labels: CRS Records, Walken
- Formerly of: The Scuzzies; Michael Cappetta; The Harrison & Tyler Show; The Cappetta Company; Suzie-Michael-Angelo; Cold Fire; Stevie & The Saints; Jimmy Ellis

Susan M. Cappetta (August 20, 1948 – April 13, 2007) was an American pop musician. She was the writer of the top 40 hit "Dave Hull The Hullabalooer" in 1965, a song about Los Angeles radio personality Dave Hull. She was a member of the group, The Scuzzies, a group made up of herself, her brothers and cousins, and later worked in The Harrison & Tyler Show act. She had done work with Jimmy Ellis.

== Background ==
Suzie Cappetta and her younger brothers, Michael and Robert, got their start in the music industry while growing up in Redondo Beach, California in the 1960s. At the age of 15, Suzie wrote a song about a local Los Angeles, California disc jockey "Dave Hull The Hullabalooer" which became a regional hit when she, her two brothers, and two cousins recorded the song in the winter of 1964. The recording was chosen by Casey Kasem as a KRLA "DJ Pick To Hit". Casey's prediction was correct when the song made the Top 40 charts in Los Angeles on March 7, 1965.

The Quintet was dubbed "The Scuzzies" by Dave Hull himself when he first aired the song on his radio show. Suzie also wrote and recorded, with the help of her brothers, several jingles for Los Angeles radio station KRLA. Among those was a jingle the Scuzzies recorded promoting Baskin-Robbins' new "Scuzzy" ice cream flavor combination.

As the Scuzzies, they made television appearances on "9th Street West" with Sam Riddle in Hollywood, Los Angeles, California and "TV-8 Dancetime" with Bob Hower in San Diego, California. They were featured in Bob Eubanks' Cinnamon Cinder and Casey Kasem's Clubs. One of the highlights for the Scuzzies in 1965 was when they became the opening act for "Sonny & Cher" at the Grand Opening of "Jamaica West Jr." in Torrance, California.

=== Overseas work ===
1969 saw brother Michael fulfilling his obligation in the US Navy, while Suzie toured with the USO shows in 1970, singing and playing bass guitar in "The Harrison & Tyler Show", the first all-female band in USO history. The show, promoted by Johnny Grant, performed for U.S. troops in Viet Nam and Thailand.

=== The Cappetta Company etc ===
By 1972, Suzie and Michael got together again to become a musical duo, entertaining in nightclubs in the South Bay, Los Angeles California area. Six months later, younger brother Robert joined Suzie and Michael as their drummer, to form a family trio.

In 1973, Suzie and her two brothers headlined as "The Cappetta Company". The popular trio was booked in the Reuben's Restaurant chain five nights a week throughout the 1970s.

As "The Cappetta Company", the trio performed "LIVE" music sets on KGBS-FM during the Glen Falkenstein Show in the mid-1970s, broadcasting from the Star Theater at Universal Studios in Hollywood, showcased in Las Vegas, Nevada in the Casinos of the Mint and Hacienda Hotels, and continued to headline in major hotels, restaurants, and night clubs throughout the 1980s and into the early 1990s. Their versatility in musical styles can be heard in their "live" performances and in their studio recordings which have received airplay on many radio stations from the Pacific Coast, to the Atlantic Coast of America, and even across the Atlantic to the UK.

Other groups

In later years she was a member of group Cold Fire that consisted of herself on vocals and acoustic guitar, Michael Cappetta on vocals and bass guitar, Martin Pomeroy on vocals guitar and keyboards, Richard Martinez on drums and Ken Roberts on guitar. Drummer Martinez would later become the General Manager for the Music is Hope Foundation. She would work with Roberts again with Stevie & the Saints, and with Jimmy Ellis. As a member of hard rock Christian group, Stevie & the Saints, she sang lead and backup vocals for the band fronted by guitarist Steve Olson.

== 1990s ==
Suzie and co would work and perform in Las Vegas and Southern California during the 1990s.

== Session work ==
In 1996 she contributed background vocals to Jimmy "Preacher" Ellis's album Red, Hot & Blues. She would do the same work again with this artist from Arkansas on his 2008 album, That's Why We All Have the Blues.

== Illness and death ==
In 1993, Cappetta had colon cancer. Five years later, she began to have heart problems, ultimately leading to congestive heart failure, which caused her health to decline more rapidly after the year 2000.

She died on April 13, 2007, at the age of 58.

== Discography ==
Singles
| Act | Song title | Release info | Year | Notes # |
|---|---|---|---|---|
| The Scuzzies | "Dave Hull The Hullabalooer" / "Our Favourite DJ" | CRS Records CRS-1110 | 1965 | |
| Suzie-Michael-Angelo | "Me and Bobby McGee" / "Gimme That" | Walken WX-428-B | 1979 | |
| Cappetta | "Hurting Me" / "All I See Is You" | Sea Seven Records 135 | | A: arranged by Davis-Delaine-Nazarian; B: arranged by Davis-Delaine-Cappetta |

Albums
| Act | Song title | Release info | Year | Notes # |
|---|---|---|---|---|
| Suzie-Michael-Angelo | Me And Bobby McGee | Walken WX427-A | 1979 | |
| The Scuzzies | Dave Hull The Hullabalooer | CRS Records | 2007 | CD album |

== Credits ==
Music roles with other artists
| Act | Song title | Album title | Release info | Year | Role | Notes # |
|---|---|---|---|---|---|---|
| The Scuzzies | "Dave Hull The Hullabalooer" | | CRS Records CRS-1110 | 1965 | writer | co producer Don Wayne |
| The Scuzzies | "Our Favorite D.J." | | CRS Records CRS-1110 | 1965 | writer | producers, Bob Field and Don Wayne |
| Suzie-Michael-Angelo, Cappetta Company | "Gimme' That" | | Walken Records WX-428-B | 1973 | lead vocal, writer | arr: Don Ralke prod: Ken Jenkins engnr: Stan Ross |
| Cappetta | "Hurting Me" | | Sea Seven Records 135 | | lead vocal, writer | Bettken Production, Arranged by Davis-Delaine-Nazarian |
| Cappetta | "All I See Is You" | | Sea Seven Records 136 | | lead vocal, writer | Bettken Production, Arranged by Davis-Delaine-Cappetta |
| Stevie & The Saints | | Eye on the Prize | Victoria Underground | 1990; 2003 | lead and backing vocals | Released on Victoria Underground CD June 13, 2003 |
| Jimmy Ellis | | Red, Hot & Blues | Kris Records 8147 | 1996 | background vocals | |
| Jimmy Ellis | | That's Why We All Have the Blues | Blues Victoria Underground 11; Big Whale 011 | 2002 | background vocals | |
