= Dave Hull =

American radio DJ (1934–2020)

- Hull at a KRLA concert in 1965
- Born: January 20, 1934; Alhambra, California
- Died: October 15, 2020 (aged 86)
- Presenting career
- Stations: KGFL; WONE-AM; WQTE; WTVN; WFLA; KRLA; KFI; KGBS; KIIS; KMPC; KHJ; KRTH; KIKF; KWXY

Dave Hull (January 20, 1934 – October 15, 2020), known as "The Hullabalooer", was an American radio personality voted one of the top ten Los Angeles radio personalities of all time.

== Career ==
Hull began his radio career in Armed Forces Radio in Casablanca, Morocco and in commercial radio in 1955 at KGFL in Roswell, New Mexico.

He got his nickname while working at WONE in Dayton, Ohio. Los Angeles radio historian Don Barrett quotes Hull as saying: "A woman wrote me from a hotel outside Dayton to say she couldn't stand all that hullabaloo. Well, Webster's defined it as a 'tumultuous outroar,' so I used it."

He reached Los Angeles' KRLA in the summer of 1963 as weekend relief and went full-time there in the 9pm-midnight slot by the fall of 1963. By the end of 1964, Hull's increasing popularity prompted one young female fan, Suzie Cappetta, to write and record a song entitled "Dave Hull The Hullabalooer", which quickly reached the local top 40 charts by early 1965.

Hull became close with The Beatles during their 1965 and 1966 American tours. During that time, Hull taped approximately fourteen interviews with the band. He, along with Bob Eubanks, planned The Beatles' 1966 concert at Chavez Ravine (Dodger Stadium).

Hull worked closely with The Beach Boys, The Dave Clark Five and The Rolling Stones during that period. In December 1965, Hull opened his "Hullabaloo" teen club on Sunset Blvd. in Hollywood.

Dave appeared (using the name David Hull) as a talent contest manager in an October 1966 episode of The Monkees.

Dave Hull was the first guest host on the nationally syndicated American Top 40 program, week ending November 6, 1971. He was heard in Los Angeles at the time on KGBS. His hilarious "Dial-a-Weirdo" call-in show on KGBS was syndicated nationally for a while in the mid-1970s.

Hull hosted the nationally syndicated TV show Matchmaker in the late 1980s, reportedly seen in over 100 markets, a video version of his late 1970s Lovelines program heard on KMPC.

Hull held the 6 PM-to-midnight slot on one of the country's few remaining beautiful music stations, KWXY in Cathedral City, California. from 1994 until his retirement in January 2010. He also remained active as a voiceover artist for national radio and television commercials. He lived in Palm Springs California. Hull's book, Hullabaloo!: the (Mis)Adventures of L.A. Radio Legend Dave Hull was released in January 2013.

== Early stations and dates ==
- KGFL Roswell, New Mexico, 1955
- WONE-AM Dayton, Ohio, 1957
- WQTE Detroit, Michigan, 1960
- WTVN Columbus, Ohio, 1961
- WFLA Tampa, Florida, 1963

== Southern California stations and dates ==
- KRLA Pasadena, 1963–1969
- KFI Los Angeles, 1969–71, return 1974
- KGBS Los Angeles, 1971–73
- KIIS Los Angeles, 1973
- KMPC Los Angeles, 1978–1980
- KRLA Pasadena, return in 1981
- KHJ Los Angeles, 1985–87
- KRLA Pasadena, return 1992
- KRTH Los Angeles, 1994
- KIKF Los Angeles, 1994
- KWXY Cathedral City, 1994-2010
