= Ostlund =

Östlund, Östlundh and Ostlund are Swedish surnames, Østlund is its Norwegian form. Notable people with the surname include:

- Agda Östlund
- Alexander Östlund, Swedish football player
- Angelica Östlund
- Anita Östlund
- Cecilia Östlund (born 1988), Swedish curler
- Christopher Östlund, Swedish magazine publisher
- Connie Östlund (born 1960), Swedish curler
- David Ostlund, American strongman athlete
- Dennis Östlundh
- Elin Östlund (born 1992), Swedish sprinter
- Erik Östlund, Swedish cross country skier
- Fanny Östlund
- Lori Ostlund, American short story writer
- Madeleine Östlund
- Marie-Helene Östlund, Swedish cross-country skier
- Noah Östlund (born 2004), Swedish ice hockey player
- Peder Østlund, (1872–1939) Norwegian speed skater
- Ruben Östlund, Swedish film director
- Thomas Östlund

== See also ==
- Ortlund
