= Stop All That Jazz =

1974 album by Leon Russell

Studio album by Leon Russell
- Released: May 10, 1974
- Recorded: 1974
- Studios: Leon Russell's House (Tulsa, Oklahoma); Paradise (Tia Juana, Oklahoma); Pete's Place (Nashville); The Church (Tulsa, Oklahoma)
- Length: 35:46 (original): 41:27 (reissue)
- Labels: Shelter (US); A&M (UK)
- Producer: Leon Russell

Leon Russell chronology
Hank Wilson's Back Vol. I (1973)	Stop All That Jazz (1974)	Live in Japan (1975)

Professional ratings
Review scores
Source	Rating
AllMusic	2/5 stars
Christgau's Record Guide	D+
Tom Hull	D+

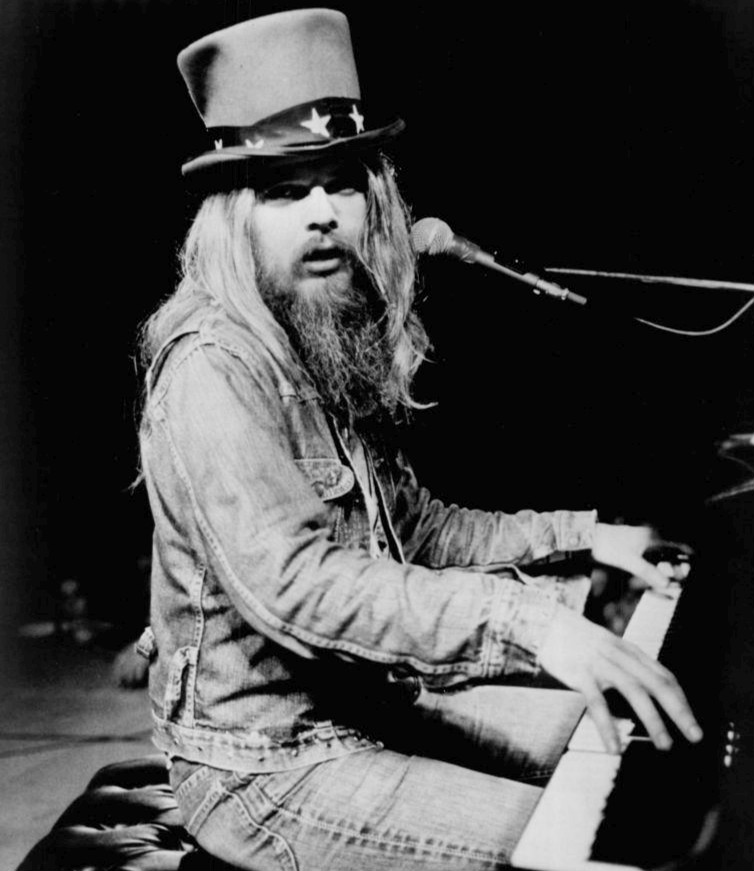
Leon Russell in 1973, Shelter Records file photo

Stop All That Jazz is an album by singer and songwriter Leon Russell. The album was recorded in 1974 at Russell's House Studio in Tulsa, Oklahoma; Paradise Studios in Tia Juana, Oklahoma; Pete's Place in Nashville, Tennessee; and Shelter The Church Studio, in Tulsa. Stop All That Jazz is Russell's sixth solo album.

The Gap Band, a funky group of Tulsans, backed Russell on the Stop All That Jazz album. Through the Stop All That Jazz album Russell introduced the world to the Gap Band. The Gap Band then released its debut album Magician's Holiday on Russell's Shelter Records label. Later Russell played piano on the group's 1977 The Gap Band release.

The album shows Russell's creativity, coming after his country music album Hank Wilson's Back Vol. I. There is a diverse array of songs on the album, some jazz as well as synthesizers and programmed drum machines. There are some standards written by others, including Bob Dylan's "The Ballad of Hollis Brown" and Tim Hardin's "If I Were a Carpenter." "Wild Horses" by the Rolling Stones was added to later versions of the album as a bonus track. Willie Nelson and JJ Cale helped with the album, playing guitar on "If I Were a Carpenter". The album was produced by Tom Cartwright, Leon Russell and Denny Cordell.

== Track listing ==
- All songs written by Leon Russell except where noted.

Side one

1. "If I Were a Carpenter" (Tim Hardin) – 3:50
2. "Smashed" (Mose Allison) – 2:17
3. "Leaving Whipporwhill" – 4:04
4. "Spanish Harlem" (Jerry Leiber, Phil Spector) – 4:33
5. "Streaker's Ball" – 2:15

Side two

1. "Working Girl" – 3:11
2. "Time for Love" – 4:00
3. "The Ballad of Hollis Brown" (Bob Dylan) – 3:54
4. "Mona Lisa Please" – 3:28
5. "Stop All That Jazz" – 3:59

Bonus tracks

11. "Wild Horses" (Mick Jagger, Keith Richards) – 3:34
12. "Wabash Cannonball" (A.P. Carter) (with Willie Nelson) – 2:47
- Note: "Time for Love" is incorrectly listed as 3:40 on the sleeve/record centre. 4:00 is the correct time.

== Charts ==
Chart (1974)	Peak position
Australia (Kent Music Report)	58
United States (Billboard 200)	34

== Personnel ==
- Leon Russell – vocals (all but 4), piano (all tracks), electric piano (7), Moog synthesizer (3, 5–8), guitar (4, 9), bass (7, 9), banjo (6), percussion (5)
- Charlie Wilson – backing vocals (8), organ (2, 8–9), percussion (4)
- John Gallie – organ (3)
- O'Dell Stokes – guitar (2, 4, 8–9)
- Willie Nelson – rhythm guitar (1)
- JJ Cale – electric guitar (1)
- Linda Hargrove – acoustic guitar (1)
- Edwin Scruggs – acoustic guitar (1)
- Pete Drake – steel guitar (1), engineer (1)
- Don Preston – guitar (3), dobro (3)
- Joey Cooper – guitar (3)
- William Kenner – mandolin (1)
- Robert Wilson – bass (2, 4, 6, 8, 10)
- Carl Radle – bass (3, 5)
- Henry Best – bass (1)
- Jamie Oldaker – drums (2, 4–6, 8–10)
- Roscoe Smith – drums (4, 8–9)
- Karl Himmel – drums (1)
- Jim Keltner – drums (3)
- Chuck Blackwell – drums (3)
- Chris Clayton – backing vocals (8), saxophone (2, 4, 6, 8–10)
- Ronnie Wilson – backing vocals (8), trumpet (2, 4, 6, 8–10)
- Tommy Lokey – backing vocals (8), trumpet (2, 4, 6, 8–10)
- Marcy Levy – backing vocals (2, 8)
- Ann Bell – backing vocals (2, 8)
- Pam Thompson – backing vocals (2, 8)
- Lena Stephens – backing vocals (2, 8)
- Denny Cordell – producer
- John Le May – engineer (2–10)
- Tom Russell – engineer (5–6, 10)
- Kirk Bressler – assistant engineer (5–6, 10)
- Tom Wilkes – album design
- Dan Mayo – photography
