= Leon Live =

1973 album by Leon Russell

Live album by Leon Russell
- Released: June 1973
- Recorded: August 28, 1972
- Venue: Long Beach Arena
- Studio: Ardent Studios
- Genres: Rhythm and blues; rock
- Length: 108:03
- Labels: Shelter Records (US); A&M (UK)

Leon Russell chronology
| Looking Back (1973) | Leon Live (1973) | Hank Wilson's Back Vol. I (1973) |

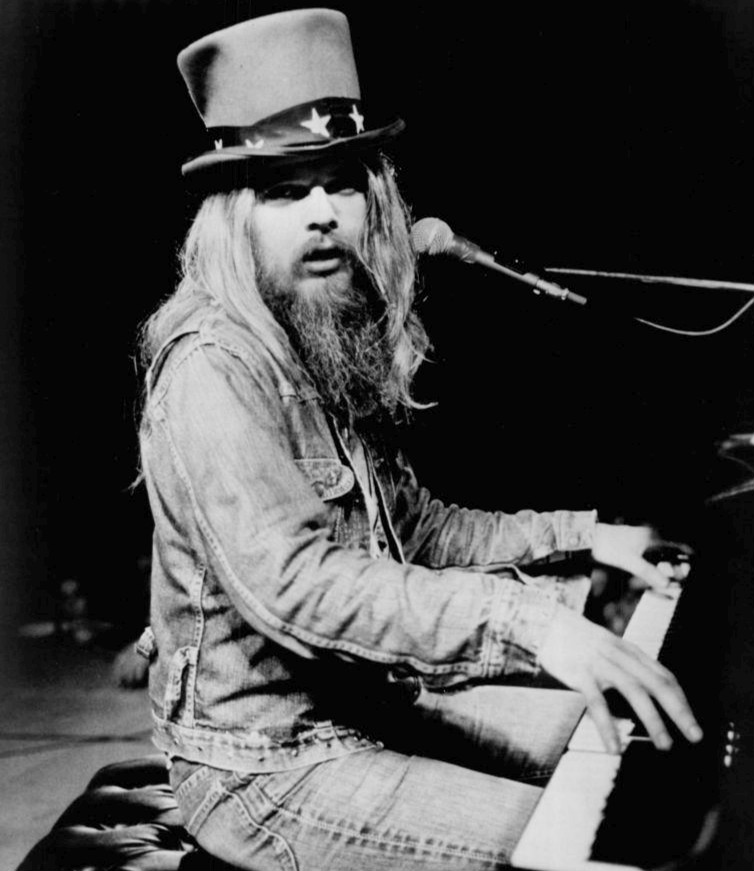
Leon Russell in 1973, Shelter Records file photo

Professional ratings
Review scores
| Source | Rating |
|---|---|
| AllMusic | 3/5 stars |

Leon Live is a live album by singer and songwriter Leon Russell recorded on August 28, 1972, at the Long Beach Arena in Long Beach, California. And [Bakersfield, Civic Auditorium. Recorded August 30, 1972] It was Russell's first live album and was originally released as a three-LP set in a tri-fold cover on Russell's Shelter Records label. The album was mixed at Ardent Studios and distributed by Capitol Records. The album peaked at No. 9 on the Billboard Top LPs chart and received a gold certification for sales of over 500,000 albums. Leon Live was re-released on CD by The Right Stuff Records in 1996. The album has gold certification for sales of over 500,000 albums in the US and Canada.

In November 1972, Billboard cited Russell as a top concert draw and reported the 1972 tour gross at almost $3 million.

== Track listing ==
All songs performed by Leon Russell. All tracks composed by Leon Russell except where indicated.

Side 1

1. "Mighty Quinn Medley: I'll Take You There/Idol with the Golden Head/I Serve a Living Savior/Mighty Quinn" (Al Bell/Jerry Leiber, Mike Stoller/Betty Watson/Bob Dylan) - 11:44
2. "Shoot Out on the Plantation" - 4:52
3. "Dixie Lullaby" (Leon Russell, Chris Stainton) - 3:10

Side 2

1. "Queen of the Roller Derby" - 1:53
2. "Roll Away the Stone" (Greg Dempsey, Leon Russell) - 3:56
3. "It's Been a Long Time Baby" (John Lee Hooker, Jules Taub) - 3:24
4. "Great Day" (Traditional) - 3:04
5. "Alcatraz" - 4:23

Side 3

1. "Crystal Closet Queen" - 6:33
2. "Prince of Peace' (Greg Dempsey, Leon Russell) - 4:27
3. "Sweet Emily" - 3:09
4. "Stranger in a Strange Land" (Don Preston, Leon Russell) - 5:01

Side 4

1. "Out in the Woods" - 9:13
2. "Some Day" (Traditional) - 3:21
3. "Sweeping Through the City" (Shirley Caesar) - 2:32

Side 5

1. "Medley: Jumpin' Jack Flash/Young Blood" (Mick Jagger, Keith Richards, Jerry Leiber, Mike Stoller, Doc Pomus) - 16:15

Side 6

1. "Of Thee I Sing/Yes I Am: Medley" (Don Preston, Leon Russell) - 10:25
2. "Delta Lady" - 3:57
3. "It's All Over Now, Baby Blue" (Bob Dylan) - 6:44

== Charts ==
| Chart (1973) | Peak position |
|---|---|
| Australia (Kent Music Report) | 16 |
| United States (Billboard 200) | 9 |

== Personnel ==
- Leon Russell - bass, guitar, keyboards, piano, vocals
- Chuck Blackwell - drums
- Ambrose Campbell - congas, drums, percussion
- Joey Cooper - guitar, vocals, backing vocals
- Nawasa Crowder - backing vocals
- John Gallie - keyboards, organ
- Rev. Patrick Henderson - arranger, keyboards, percussion, piano, vocals, backing vocals
- Phyllis Lindsey - vocals
- Don Preston - guitar, vocals, backing vocals
- Carl Radle - bass
- John LeMay - Mixing
- John Fry - Mixing
- Ellis Widner - Liner Notes
- Ed Caraeff - Photography
- Tom Cartwright - Reissue Producer
- Jason Arnold - Mastering
- Denny Cordell - Producer
