= Raymond C. Ortlund Jr. =

American evangelical pastor and author

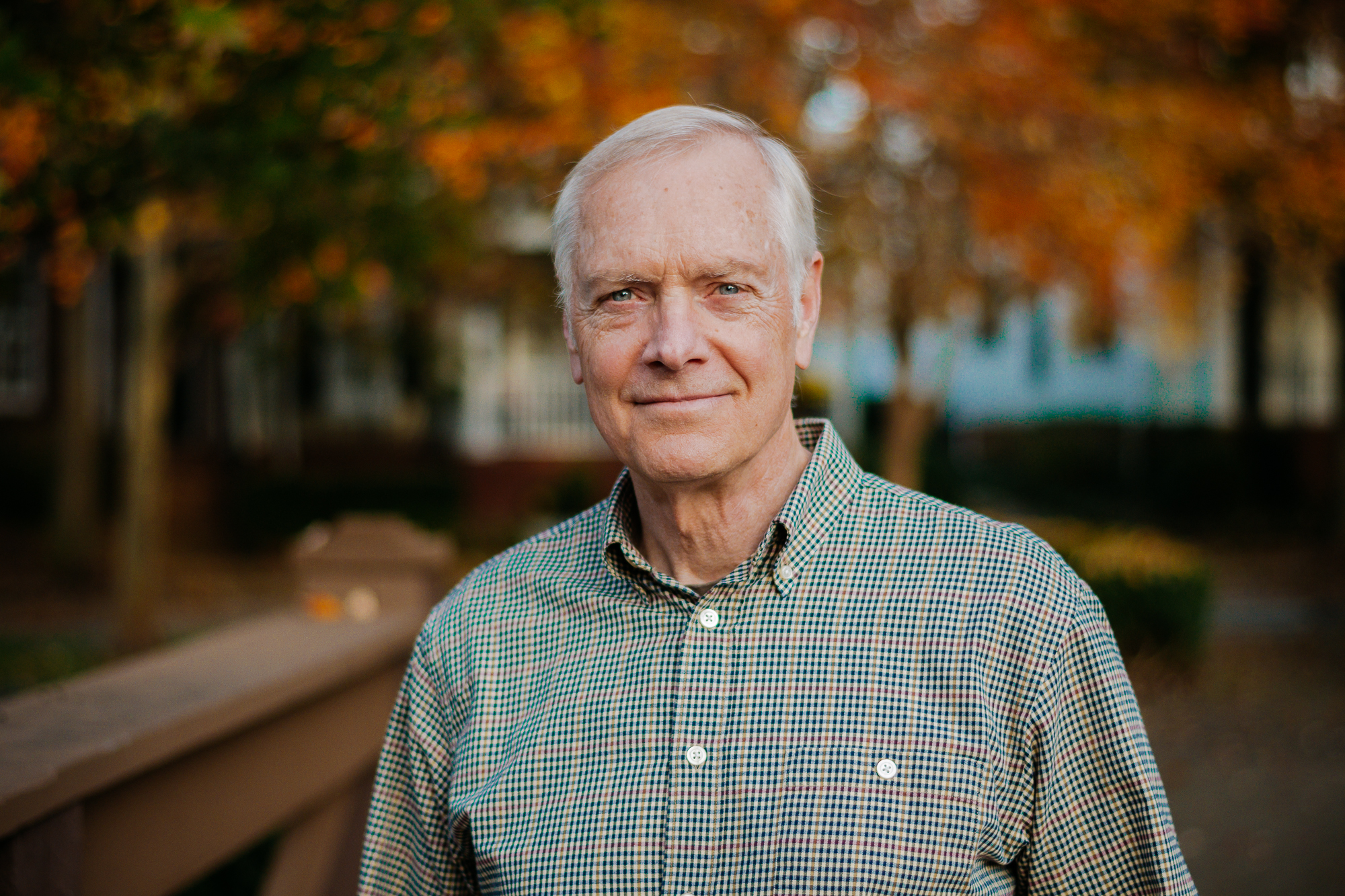
- Ortlund in 2021
- Born: 1949 (age 76–77); Pasadena, California, US
- Education: Wheaton College (B.A.); Dallas Theological Seminary (Th.M., 1975); University of California, Berkeley (M.A., 1978); University of Aberdeen (Ph.D.)
- Occupation: Pastor · theologian · author · professor
- Years active: 1975–present
- Organizations: Immanuel Church (Nashville); Renewal Ministries; Trinity Evangelical Divinity School
- Known for: Founding pastor of Immanuel Church (Nashville); President of Renewal Ministries; Old Testament professor at Trinity Evangelical Divinity School
- Notable work: A Passion for God (1994); When God Comes to Church: A Biblical Model for Revival Today (2000)
- Spouse: Jani Ortlund
- Children: 4, including Gavin
- Parents: Raymond C. Ortlund Sr. (father); Anne Ortlund (mother)
- Website: renewalministries.com

Raymond C. Ortlund Jr. (born 1949) is an American Reformed theologian and retired pastor. Being the founding pastor of Immanuel Church in Nashville, he is the son of Renewal Ministries founders Ray and Anne Ortlund. He has served in pastoral ministry and is the author of several Bible commentaries and other books. He taught Old Testament at Trinity Evangelical Divinity School in Deerfield, Illinois for nine years. He has served on the translation committees of the New Living Translation and English Standard Version Bible translations, and provided the study notes on Isaiah for the ESV Study Bible. He has also served as Canon Theologian in the Diocese of the Western Gulf Coast of the Anglican Church in North America.

Ortlund serves as president of Renewal Ministries.

== Early life ==
Raymond C. Ortlund Jr. is the son of Ray and Anne Ortlund. After high school, he attended Wheaton College in Illinois. While a student at Wheaton, he met his wife, Jani.

Ortlund has said his participation in the Jesus movement shaped his understanding of Christianity as a renewal movement. He has also said that while attending the first Lausanne Congress on World Evangelization, Francis Schaeffer's address left a lasting impact on his convictions about pastoral ministry.

== Ministry ==
After graduating from Dallas Theological Seminary in 1975, Ortlund joined the staff of Peninsula Bible Church in Palo Alto, California. He was ordained in 1975 at Lake Avenue Church, where his father was pastor. He received an MA degree from the University of California, Berkeley in 1978. He moved to Scotland to pursue his PhD degree from University of Aberdeen. While there, he served as assistant minister of Banchory Ternan West Church of Scotland from 1982-1985.

After returning to the United States in 1985, Ortlund worked with planting Cascade Presbyterian Church in Eugene, Oregon. After Cascade was accepted into the Presbyterian Church in America (PCA), he began teaching Old Testament and Semitic languages at Trinity Evangelical Divinity School in Deerfield, Illinois. Following nine years at Trinity, Ortlund returned to the pastorate at the 1,500 member First Presbyterian Church (PCA) in Augusta, Georgia, which he led as senior pastor for five years.

In 2004, Ortlund moved to Nashville as senior pastor of Christ Presbyterian Church. After parting ways with Christ Presbyterian in 2007, Ortlund and his wife were involved with a fellowship group which ultimately grew to a Bible study group that became Immanuel Church in Nashville. Immanuel had its first public service in 2008 and joined Acts 29 in 2009. From 2011 to 2012 Ortlund served as an Acts 29 regional director.

Ortlund serves as president of Renewal Ministries. He also served as a Canon Theologian in the Diocese of the Western Gulf Coast of the Anglican Church in North America. As an Old Testament scholar, Ortlund served on the translation committee of the New Living Translation (NLT) for Psalms 76-150. He was a review scholar for the English Standard Version (ESV) translation and provided study notes for Isaiah in the ESV Study Bible.

Ortlund has taken public stands against racism. In 2015, after a number of African-American churches were set on fire in St. Louis, he tweeted, "Hey racists, come burn our church too. We stand for Jesus too. We oppose racism too." After a racially motivated mass shooting at an El Paso Walmart in 2019, Ortlund tweeted that mass shootings were evil and "if motivated by racism, evil compounded".

When Ortlund endorsed Kamala Harris for president on social media in October 2024, he received criticism from political conservatives. He later deleted the post saying it was being misrepresented.

== Theological views ==
Ortlund describes his own theological views as Reformed: "I believe in the sovereignty of God, the Five Points of Calvinism, the Solas of the Reformation, I believe that grace precedes faith in regeneration. Theologically, I am Reformed." In his podcast, You're Not Crazy, Ortlund said that his purpose is "to very carefully, reverently, joyously attend to cultivate and build the intangibles of relational beauty that the gospel itself calls for and creates". He points out that "gospel doctrine creates gospel culture, and has the same authority as gospel doctrine".

Ortlund is an emeritus council member of the Gospel Coalition, "a fellowship of evangelical churches in the Reformed tradition". As a minister of the Presbyterian Church in America (PCA), he affirmed the Westminster Confession of Faith. He serves in the Anglican Church in North America which requires affirmation of the Thirty-nine Articles. Ortlund's exegetical approach is from a confessional perspective.

Ortlund has written in support of complementarianism. In the 1991 book Recovering Biblical Manhood and Womanhood, he wrote that the principle of male-female equality was established at creation, as was male headship, saying, "In the partnership of two spiritually equal human beings, man and woman, the man bears the primary responsibility to lead the partnership in a God-glorifying direction." He clarified that the idea of headship and equality are not mutually exclusive. Being made in God's image, their equality is in the spiritual realm, while Genesis 1-3 allows men "headship" within this concept of equality. According to Ortlund, the interpretation of gender roles in Genesis 1-3 frames the rest of the biblical debate.

After the Supreme Court's Obergefell v. Hodges decision in 2015 legalizing same-sex marriage in the United States, Ortlund signed the Ethics & Religious Liberty Commission statement defining marriage as between one man and one woman. He was one of the initial signers of the Nashville Statement, an evangelical statement of faith relating to human sexuality and gender roles authored by the Council on Biblical Manhood and Womanhood in 2017.

Ortlund has emphasized how the Old Testament is important as part of a guide to the Christian faith, saying that the Apostle Paul stressed his roots in Judaism.

== Personal life ==
He is married to Jani and they have four children, including theologian and author Gavin Ortlund.

== Selected works ==
- — (1994). A Passion for God: Prayers and Meditations on the Book of Romans. Wheaton, Illinois: Crossway.
- — (1996). Whoredom: God's Unfaithful Wife in Biblical Theology. Grand Rapids, Michigan: Eerdmans.
- — (2000). When God Comes to Church: A Biblical Model for Revival Today. Baker.
- — (2001). Supernatural Living for Natural People: Studies in Romans 8. Christian Focus.
- — (2005). Isaiah: God Saves Sinners. Wheaton, Illinois: Crossway.
- — (2012). Proverbs: Wisdom That Works. Wheaton, Illinois: Crossway.
- — (2014). The Gospel: How the Church Portrays the Beauty of Christ. Wheaton, Illinois: Crossway.
- — (2016). Marriage and the Mystery of the Gospel. Wheaton, Illinois: Crossway.
- — (2021). The Death of Porn: Men of Integrity Building a World of Nobility. Wheaton, Illinois: Crossway.
- — (2023). You're Not Crazy: Gospel Sanity for Weary Churches. Wheaton, Illinois: Crossway.
- — (2023). The Psalms: Real Help for Real Life. Lifeway.
- — (2025). Good News at Rock Bottom: Finding God When the Pain Goes Deep and Hope Seems Lost. Wheaton, Illinois: Crossway.
