= Jimmy "Preacher" Ellis =

American blues musician (1934–2022)

- Also known as: Preacher
- Born: James Ellis; August 17, 1934; Foreman, Arkansas, United States
- Died: September 16, 2022 (aged 88) Dallas, Texas
- Genres: Blues
- Occupations: Singer, musician
- Instrument: Guitar
- Labels: Jewel, Romark, Round, Kris, Tramp Records

James "Preacher" Ellis (August 17, 1934 – September 16, 2022) was an American blues musician. His recording career dated back to the mid 1960s. On more than one occasion he played at the Dusk Til Dawn Blues Festivals. In the 1960s he did some recordings that were released on the Jewel, Space, Kris and Romark labels. The type of music he recorded over the years ranged from blues and R&B to psychedelic funk and, in the 1970s, soul music from that era.

== Background ==
He was born in Foreman, Arkansas in 1934 into a farming community. His teenage years were spent in Seattle, Washington. In those years he was a member of the Mount Baker Baptist Church singing in the choir. He was asked by the Reverend F.F. Billups to join the group The Travelling Four to replace the group's baritone singer who had just left. By 1955 when he was around 20 years old the group broke up. He soon enlisted in the army. In the late 1950s he became more seriously involved in playing the guitar and with Tony Harris and Billy Marshall who were from The Travelling Four, he formed the Centuries. In 1964 and now a solo artist, he headed to Los Angeles, hoping to record and later that year his first record single was released. Later in 1964, he met R&B songwriter 'Fats' Washington. Ellis recorded a couple of singles that were released on Washington's Movin' label. Later he had a couple more singles released this time on the Ride label which was another one of Washington's.

=== 1990s to 2000s ===
In the 1990s he appeared on stage with Peter Tork. In 1996, his Red, Hot & Blues album was released. It featured songs such as "Sweet Dreams", "Every Day's A Holiday With The Blues", "(I'm Your) Hoochie Coochie Man" and "Rainy Night In Georgia". Saxophonist Stemsy Hunter, drummer Richard Martinez and singer Suzie Cappetta contributed to the album.

In 2002, he appeared at the Topanga Canyon Blues Festival. In 2010, he played at a tribute concert for Blind Willie Johnson, marking the 65th anniversary of his death. Other venues he has played at is the Littlefield in Brooklyn. In 2013, a compilation album of his releases between 1963 and 1973 was released on Tramp Records. The album was called The Story Of Jimmy ‘Preacher’ Ellis. In August 2013 he appeared at the D.C. Minner’s 23rd Annual Rentiesville Dusk til Dawn Blues Festival. In August 2015, he was at the Dusk 'til Dawn Blues Festival in Oklahoma.

=== Death ===
He died in Dallas, Texas, on September 16, 2022, at the age of 88.

== Singles ==
List
| Artist title | Release title(s) | Label and cat | Year | Notes # |
|---|---|---|---|---|
| Jimmie "Preacher" Ellis | "Work With What You Got" / "Fool For A Friend" | Ride R-144 | 1965 | |
| Jimmie Ellis | "Baby I Love You" / "Kiddio" | Ride R-146 | 1965 | |
| Jimmy "Preacher" Ellis | "Go Head On" / "I'm Gonna Do It By Myself" | Movin' M-136; Jewel 770 | 1966 | |
| Jimmy "Preacher" Ellis | "Nobody Knows" / "Cry No More" | Movin' M-141 | 1966 | |
| Jimmy "Preacher" Ellis and the Odd Fellows | "Two Tenors – A Tone and A Bone" / "(C'mon) Dance to the Drumbeat" | Kris K-1679 | 1968 | |
| Jimmy Ellis | "Heaven Has Blessed You" / "Puttin' It on Your Mind" | Salem 1001 | 1969 | |
| Jimmie "Preacher" Ellis | "That's the Way I Am" / "You Can't Pour Water on Me (And Tell Me It's Raining)" | Hip-Delic 313 | 1970 | |
| Jimmie Ellis | "I Gotta See My Baby" / "Looking Through the Eyes of Love" | Hip-Delic 314 | 1970 | |
| Jimmie Ellis and the 13th Hour Band | "I Just Wanna Be Myself" / "13th Hour" | Space 45-305 | 1970 | |
| Jimmie "Preacher" Ellis | "Don't Tax Me In" / "Trouble All Over the Land" | Space 45-306 | 1970 | |
| Jimmie Ellis | "Happy To Be (The Man You Like To See)" / "Looking Through the Eyes of Love" | Century City CCR-511 | 1970 | |
| Jimmie "Preacher" Ellis | "I Can't Work and Watch You" / "Tough Competition" | Romark RK-116 | 1971 | |
| Jimmie (Preacher) Ellis and the Odd Fellows | "I Gotta See My Baby" / "Put Your Hoe (To My Row)" | Round 1036 | 1971 | |
| James Ellis | "Ain't Gonna Cry No More" / Ain't Gonna Cry No More (Instrumental)" | Cotillion 44121 | 1971 | |
| Jimmy Ellis | "Why I Sing the Blues, Part 1" / "Why I Sing the Blues, Part 2" | Kris K-8114 | | |
| Jimmy Ellis | "Outskirt of Town, Part 1" / "Outskirt of Town, Part 2" | Kris K-8115 | | |
| Jimmy Ellis | "Party Time, Pt. 1" / "Party Time, Pt. 2" | Kris K-8121 | | |
| Jimmy (Preacher) Ellis | "Can't Work & Watch You" / "Work With It" | Kris K-8144 | | |

== Albums/CDs ==
List
| Release title | Label and cat | Year | Notes # |
|---|---|---|---|
| Red, Hot & Blues | Kris K-8147 | 1996 | |
| That's Why We All Have the Blues | Victoria Underground VCD-011 | 2002 | |
| The Story of Jimmy Preacher Ellis | Tramp TR-9020 | 2013 | |

=== Appears on ===
List
| Release title | Label and cat | Song title | Year | Format | Notes # |
|---|---|---|---|---|---|
| The Sound Of Funk Volume Ten | Goldmine Soul Supply GSLP97 | "I Gotta See My Baby" | 1996 | LP | Various artists comp as Jamie Ellis |
| Up All Night, Vol. 2: 30 Underground Soul Hits | Charly Records R 447756 | "I'm Gonna Do It By Myself" | 1999 | CD | Various artists comp |
| Kris Records ... Los Angeles' Showcase Of Soul | Kent Soul CDKEND 162 | "You" | 1998 | CD | Various artists comp |
| The Sound Of Funk Volume Ten | Goldmine Soul Supply GSCD 97 | "I Gotta See My Baby" | 2000 | CD | Various artists comp as Jamie Ellis |
| R'n'B Meets Northern Soul Volume 2 | Goldmine Soul Supply GSCD 188 | "Puttin' It On Your Mind" | 2006 | CD | Various artists comp |
| R'n'B Meets Northern Soul Volume 2 | V.O.R. VORLP114 | "Puttin' It On Your Mind" | 2009 | LP | Various artists comp |
| President Johnson’s Blues | Agram Blues AB 2020 | "Don't Tax Me In" | 2009 | CD | Various artists comp |
| Romark Records: Kent Harris' Soul Sides | Kent Soul CDKEND 397 | "Tough Competition" | 2013 | CD | Various artists comp |
| For Dancers Only - Northern & Rare Soul Club - 10th Anniversary | (For Dancers Only Self Compiled & Released) | "Baby I Love You" | 2013 | CD-R | Various artists comp free give-away on the 10th anniversary nighter "For Dancers Only" on 2013-12-14; Hafenklang/ Hamburg -Germany |
| The Get It! Raw Funk Of '67 - '69! | Get-S-4003 | "Put Your Hoe (To My Row)" | Various artists comp | LP; CD | LP and CD have the same part number |
