= Bob Eubanks =

American television and radio personality (born 1938)

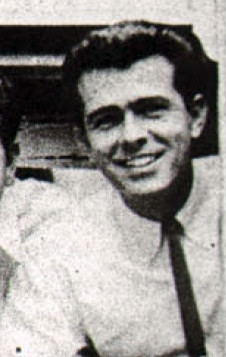
- Eubanks in 1964
- Born: Robert Leland Eubanks; January 8, 1938 (age 88); Flint, Michigan, U.S.
- Occupations: Game show host; television personality; radio personality
- Years active: 1956–present
- Spouses: Irma Brown (m. 1969; died 2002); Deborah James (m. 2004)
- Children: 4
- Website: bobeubanks.com

Robert Leland Eubanks (born January 8, 1938) is an American disc jockey, television personality and game show host, widely known for hosting the game show The Newlywed Game on and off since 1966. He also hosted the successful revamp version of Card Sharks from 1986 to 1989. He received a star on the Hollywood Walk of Fame for his radio DJ work in 2000. It is in front of Grauman's Egyptian Theatre, where he worked during the first years of his broadcasting career. In 2005, he received a lifetime achievement Emmy Award from the Academy of Television Arts & Sciences.

== Biography ==
Eubanks was born in Flint, Michigan, but was raised primarily in Pasadena, California, where he grew up listening to music, most notably favorites like Frank Sinatra and Doc Watson. His parents, John Otho Leland Eubanks (September 28, 1905 – April 11, 1995) and Gertrude Eubanks (née McClure; 1907–1997), were originally from Missouri. They moved to Flint during the Great Depression, where their only child was born, before moving on to California. The young boy became a child model, doing photo shoots for ads and meeting his idol, Gene Autry, during an ad photo shoot with him.

Eubanks watched popular classic television and quiz game shows. Also growing up in the 1940s and 1950s, he was influenced by Cary Grant, Howard Hughes, Buddy Hackett, and Bill Cullen. He attended Pasadena High School, where he graduated in 1955. After graduation from high school, he attended Los Angeles Pierce College (according to his commentary on a Card Sharks episode) and then went on to become one of California's most popular disc jockeys. In 1956, Eubanks worked at his first radio station, KACY in Oxnard, California. He joined KRLA in Pasadena in 1960 to do the overnight show. In the spring of 1962, he was promoted to morning drive; a year later, he moved to his long-running 6–9 pm evening slot. During most of the 1960s, he was also a promoter of concerts such as the Beatles' 1964 and 1965 Hollywood Bowl performances and the Rolling Stones during the first two years of their American tour. While still in Los Angeles, he also promoted such artists as Barry Manilow, The Supremes, Dolly Parton, Bob Dylan, Elton John, and Merle Haggard, among others.

Eubanks married Irma Barnard of Ann Arbor, an avid athlete, ranch forewoman and artist, on September 10, 1969. They had three children: Trace, a retired firefighter; Corey, a stuntman; and Theresa. In 1970, the couple purchased a 20-acre (81,000 m^{2}) portion of a working cattle ranch, and later expanded it to 26 acres (110,000 m^{2}). The entire family enjoyed roping and riding, with Eubanks participating in rodeos during his spare time. Eubanks is a gold card member of the Professional Rodeo Cowboys Association. Barnard handled interior decorating, landscaping, and mounting one to two equestrian shows a year. She died in 2002 after a prolonged illness.

In 2004, Eubanks married Deborah James, a woman 29 years younger. James is a wedding/events coordinator in Ventura, California and has her own company, Bella Vita Events. The couple has a young son, Noah. In October 2010, Eubanks and James put their Westlake Village, California home on the market.

== The Newlywed Game and country music business ==
In 1966, Eubanks received a phone call from Chuck Barris, asking him to host a new game show, The Newlywed Game; the show premiered on ABC later that same year. During its debut, it was an immediate hit, and the show's popularity led the network to expand the prime-time lineup, where it had run on the air for five years. Only 28 years old when he started hosting, Eubanks became widely popular for bringing a youthful energy to daytime television, pressing contestants into giving embarrassing and hilarious answers. The Newlywed Game was also ranked as one of the top three daytime game shows, for five consecutive seasons, between 1968 and 1973, and was ranked in the top three prime-time game shows, also for five seasons, between 1966 and 1971.

While hosting The Newlywed Game, Eubanks was known for using the catchphrase "makin' whoopee", in reference to sexual intercourse. It was Eubanks who borrowed the term from the song of the same name, in an attempt to keep parents with young children from having to explain the facts of life because of a television show. While the network was comfortable with the term "making love", its Standards and Practices Department did not allow the use of the word "panties".

While not taping, he also pursued a career in the country music business, where he served as manager of such artists as Dolly Parton, Barbara Mandrell and Marty Robbins. The same year, he also signed Merle Haggard to an exclusive live-performance contract, producing more than 100 dates per year with the performer for almost a decade.

The Newlywed Game ended in 1974, after 2195 episodes, making Eubanks one of the most viewed game show hosts to date. He also hosted various editions in syndication (1977–1980, 1985–1988 and 1997–1999). For season two of the show's 2009 revival on GSN, Eubanks hosted a celebrity charity episode with Carnie Wilson and her husband Rob Bonfiglio playing against Carnie's sister Wendy and her husband Daniel Knutson, and their mother Marilyn Wilson-Rutherford and her current husband Daniel Rutherford. In spring 2010, Eubanks hosted another episode of The Newlywed Game, subtitled "Game Show Kings". It featured Monty Hall and his wife Marilyn Hall, Peter Marshall and his wife Laurie Stewart, and Wink Martindale with his wife Sandy. This made Eubanks the only person to host the same game show in six consecutive decades (1960s, 1970s, 1980s, 1990s, 2000s and 2010s).

In 1988, Eubanks left The Newlywed Game to pursue other interests (though he was still hosting Card Sharks on CBS for another seven months) and was replaced by Paul Rodriguez.

In 1996, Eubanks appeared as a substitute host of Prime Time Country on The Nashville Network.

== Other game shows ==
After Newlywed Game, Eubanks hosted a number of other game shows in his career, including Rhyme and Reason, Card Sharks, Dream House, The Diamond Head Game, Trivia Trap, and Powerball: The Game Show. Eubanks also auditioned to host the CBS daytime version of Wheel of Fortune; however, Bob Goen was hired instead.

In 1985, Mark Goodson hired Eubanks, a second time (the first being the aforementioned Trivia Trap), to host a revamped version of the show Card Sharks for CBS. Eubanks hosted Card Sharks throughout its CBS run from January 1986 until its demise in March 1989. Prior to hosting Card Sharks, he appeared as a special guest on the original NBC version alongside Jim Perry to promote his 1979 game show All Star Secrets, which he also produced.

His final network game show was Family Secrets. In recent years, he has hosted or co-hosted all five of NBC's Most Outrageous Game Show Moments specials. Eubanks was also one of three rotating hosts (along with Chuck Woolery and Jamie Farr) of the "$250,000 Game Show Spectacular" at the Las Vegas Hilton until the show closed in April 2008.

Besides producing Hill-Eubanks's All Star Secrets, the company also produced The Guinness Game in 1979–80, The Toni Tennille Show in 1980, Buddy Hackett's You Bet Your Life revival in 1980, and Infatuation (which Eubanks also hosted) in 1992. Between 1994 and 1995 Eubanks also traveled to Britain to host a British version of this series, Infatuation UK, produced by Thames Television for UK cable network Living TV. Eubanks tried acting, but found he was not good at doing lines; he also learned the game show business was far more lucrative and less confining.

== Radio ==
Prior to entering game shows, Eubanks was a popular radio DJ at station KRLA 1110 in Los Angeles as well as a music promoter and manager, between 1960 and 1968. He was responsible for bringing The Beatles to Los Angeles for their first West Coast performances at the famed Hollywood Bowl in 1964 and 1965 (mortgaging his house to do so), with fellow KRLA DJs Dave Hull and Reb Foster joining Eubanks in introducing them. He also operated several Cinnamon Cinder nightclubs. In the early to mid 1960s, the house band at his the Traffic Circle Cinnamon Cinder club was The Vibrants.

He stood in for Casey Kasem twice on radio's American Top 40: January 9–10, 1982 (that year's first regular episode), and April 16–17, 1983.

== Other appearances ==
Eubanks hosted the televised 1964 Miss Teen USA pageant, with actor Sebastian Cabot making an appearance as one of the guests.

Eubanks appeared in Michael Moore's 1989 documentary Roger & Me. The film documented Moore's attempts to track General Motors CEO Roger Smith to confront him about the economic devastation resulting from the company's closure of eleven manufacturing plants in Flint, Michigan. Eubanks, a native of Flint, was interviewed about his views on the downsizing, and was filmed telling an off-color homophobic, anti-Semitic joke:

MOORE: [In regards to The Newlywed Game containing racy/sexual content] Bob was right. He didn't say "breasts" and I considered apologizing for implying that his show wasn't wholesome family entertainment.

[cut to:]

EUBANKS: You know why Jewish women don't get AIDS? Because they marry assholes, they don't screw them. Pardon me.

According to Moore in the film's DVD commentary, Eubanks attempted to denounce the film with the Anti-Defamation League for containing anti-Semitic content, despite the fact that the only anti-Semitic content in the film was contributed by Eubanks himself. In a 2010 interview for the Archive of American Television, Eubanks discussed his encounter with Moore and gave an explanation on how the ill-fated joke came about.

In 1992, Eubanks appeared on the TV sitcom The Fresh Prince of Bel-Air in the episode "Eyes on the Prize" hosting the game show "Double Trouble". That same year, he also made a cameo in the movie Home Alone 2: Lost in New York hosting the game show "Ding-Dang-Dong", where he mentioned that the show's contestants stayed at the Plaza Hotel in New York City, and also gave the phone number for reservations (which allowed Kevin McCallister, played by Macaulay Culkin, to check in).

He has also hosted the Tournament of Roses Parade on Los Angeles television channel KTLA since 1976 and with Stephanie Edwards from 1978 to 2005. In 2006, Eubanks continued to host with Edwards's replacement, KTLA Morning News anchor Michaela Pereira. Edwards returned to her co-hosting position alongside Eubanks in 2009. In September 2015, Bob Eubanks and Stephanie Edwards announced on the KTLA Morning News that the 2016 parade will be their last. In 2017, they were replaced by Leeza Gibbons and Mark Steines.

Eubanks appeared as himself on the Nickelodeon sitcom Kenan & Kel in the episode "The Honeymoon's Over", which aired May 1999. He guest-starred on That '70s Show in the January 2000 episode "Eric's Stash".

He also hosted for some years the Miss California USA Pageant and Mrs. International Pageant, sister pageant to the Miss International (United States) Pageant, between 2000 and 2003.

On July 6, 2007, Eubanks sat in as a celebrity "Mob Member" on the NBC game show 1 vs. 100. A year after that, he appeared as a GSN Live guest on April 4, 2008, and returned on May 18, 2010. His most recent television appearance (not counting his annual KTLA Rose Parade appearances) was on The Amazing Race 17 season finale, which aired December 12, 2010. In 2011, Eubanks hosted a special version of The Newlywed Game, live at Champion's Week for the NASCAR Sprint Cup Series.

His autobiography, It's in the Book, Bob (ISBN 1-932100-28-8), was published in 2004.

Eubanks briefly appears in the music video for The Offspring's "Why Don't You Get a Job?"

In 2013, Eubanks toured with "America's Greatest Game Shows: Live on Stage".

In 2015, he appeared as a host of a couples game on Marriage Boot Camp: Reality Stars on We TV.

On April 21, 2023, it was announced that Eubanks would be featured in an upcoming four-episode documentary by ABC News titled The Game Show Show, covering the history of game shows in America over the last eight decades. The four-part documentary premiered on May 10, 2023.

Media offices
Preceded by Mike Darow (1968-1970)	Host of Dream House; 1983 – 1984	Succeeded by series cancelled
Preceded by Jim Perry	Host of Card Sharks; January 6, 1986 – March 31, 1989	Succeeded by Pat Bullard
