= Gavin Ortlund =

American Christian apologist and theologian (born 1983)

- Born: June 30, 1983 (age 43); Scotland
- Education: University of Georgia (BA); Covenant Theological Seminary (MDiv); Fuller Theological Seminary (PhD)
- Occupations: Christian apologist; professor
- Spouse: Esther Ortlund
- Children: 5
- Father: Raymond C. Ortlund Jr.
- Theological work
- Tradition or movement: Reformed Baptist
- Notable ideas: Theological triage
- Website: truthunites.org

Gavin Rutherford Ortlund (born June 30, 1983) is an American Christian apologist, Reformed Baptist theologian, and author. Operating through his public ministry Truth Unites, Ortlund is known for defending theologically conservative evangelical Protestantism from an irenic perspective, engaging with proponents of Roman Catholicism, Eastern Orthodoxy, atheism, and liberal Protestantism.

Ortlund is Theologian-in-Residence at Immanuel Nashville (Note: Immanuel Nashville is a church in Nashville, TN.) and Visiting Professor of Historical Theology at Phoenix Seminary. He won Christianity Today's 2024 Book of the Year award for his work What It Means to Be Protestant: The Case for an Always-Reforming Church.

== Early life and education ==
Ortlund was born on June 30, 1983 in Scotland to parents Raymond C. Ortlund Jr. and Jani Ortlund. He was originally baptized as an infant in the Church of Scotland and he is the youngest of 4 children.

In 2006, Ortlund earned a Bachelor of Arts in Philosophy and Religion from the University of Georgia. In 2009, he earned a Master of Divinity from Covenant Theological Seminary. He went on to earn a Doctor of Philosophy from Fuller Theological Seminary in 2016, concentrating in historical theology. From 2017 to 2018, Ortlund performed post-doctoral research at Trinity Evangelical Divinity School through the Carl F. H. Henry Center for Theological Understanding, where he conducted research on Augustine's doctrine of creation.

== Career ==
=== Pastoral ministry ===
After finishing his Master's degree, Ortlund was on his way to become a minister in the Presbyterian Church in America. Due to concerns regarding pedobaptism, he was baptized upon profession of faith by immersion and sought ordination from the Conservative Congregational Christian Conference instead. He served as an associate pastor of Sierra Madre Congregational Church.

From 2018 to 2023, Ortlund served as Senior Pastor of First Baptist Church of Ojai (American Baptist Churches USA) in Ojai, California. In October 2023, he announced his departure from the pastorate to pursue full-time ministry through digital platforms and academic roles.

=== Current positions ===
Ortlund currently serves as President of Truth Unites, a Christian apologetics and theological education ministry he launched in August 2020. He holds the position of Theologian-in-Residence at Immanuel Church in Nashville, Tennessee.

Ortlund is a fellow of the Keller Center for Cultural Apologetics, run by The Gospel Coalition. In addition, Ortlund is a member of the Center for Baptist Renewal, and Credo, while maintaining membership in the St. Basil Fellowship of The Center for Pastor Theologians and serving as a Visiting Scholar at Reasons to Believe.

In March 2025, Ortlund was appointed as Visiting Professor of Historical Theology at Phoenix Seminary.

In September 2025, The Gospel Coalition published the first version of its AI Christian Benchmark research project, of which Ortlund was a contributor.

== Views ==
- Ortlund has defended the doctrine of divine simplicity and the Thomistic view of the beatific vision.
- Ortlund has defended the view that Noah's flood was a regional event and not a global event, arguing that such a position is consistent with "an effort to take seriously the meaning of the text, which involves what the original author meant the original readers to take from it in its original context." This claim has caused controversy within Evangelicalism and ignited accusations of theological liberalism, which he has denied.
- Ortlund also holds to the position of biblical inerrancy. He identifies as a theologically conservative Christian in accordance with traditional historic Protestant positions. "I'm an evangelical Christian. I believe in biblical inerrancy. I think the Scripture is fully trustworthy. I think if people were to go down the line on... the average sort of testing issues of our times, they'd find me pretty conservative, pretty classically Christian in my instincts."

== Bibliography ==
Ortlund has written a variety of books surrounding various biblical, theological, and ecclesiastical studies:

- 1–2 Kings: A 12-Week Study (Wheaton, IL: Crossway, 2017)
- Theological Retrieval for Evangelicals: Why We Need Our Past to Have a Future (Wheaton, IL: Crossway, 2019)
- Finding the Right Hills to Die On: The Case for Theological Triage (Wheaton, IL: Crossway, 2020) (Note: Co-published with The Gospel Coalition.)
- Anselm's Pursuit of Joy: A Commentary on the Proslogion (Washington, DC: Catholic University of America Press, 2020)
- Retrieving Augustine's Doctrine of Creation: Ancient Wisdom for Current Controversy (Downers Grove, IL: IVP Academic, 2020)
- Why God Makes Sense in a World That Doesn't: The Beauty of Christian Theism (Grand Rapids, MI: Baker Academic, 2021)
- Humility: The Joy of Self-Forgetfulness (Wheaton, IL: Crossway, 2023) (Note: Co-published with Union School of Theology.)
- What It Means to Be Protestant: The Case for an Always-Reforming Church (Grand Rapids, MI: Zondervan, 2024)
- The Art of Disagreeing: How to Keep Calm and Stay Friends in Hard Conversations (Epsom, England: The Good Book Company, 2025)
- Why Christianity Makes Sense: A Book About Jesus, the Mysteries of the World, and the Longings in Your Heart (Grand Rapids, MI: Zondervan, 2026)

== Personal life ==
Ortlund is married to his wife, Esther, and they have five children. He has two brothers: Dane Ortlund, author of Gentle and Lowly: The Heart of Christ for Sinners and Sufferers, and Eric Ortlund, who serves as a Lecturer in Old Testament and Biblical Hebrew at Oak Hill College in London.
