= KRLA =

Coordinates: 34°08′13″N 118°13′37.3″W

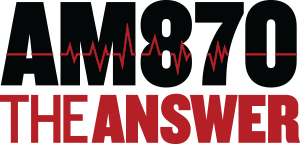
- Glendale, California; United States
- Broadcast area: Southern California
- Frequency: 870 kHz
- Branding: AM 870 The Answer

Programming
- Format: Conservative talk radio
- Affiliations: Salem Radio Network; Townhall News

Ownership
- Owner: Salem Media Group; (New Inspiration Broadcasting Company)
- Sister stations: KKLA-FM; KTIE

History
- First air date: February 1933
- Former call signs: KIEV (1933–2001)
- Call sign meaning: Keen Radio Los Angeles

Technical information
- Licensing authority: FCC
- Facility ID: 61267
- Class: B
- Power: 50,000 watts (day); 3,000 watts (night)

Links
- Public license information: Public file; LMS
- Webcast: Listen live
- Website: am870theanswer.com

KRLA (870 AM, "AM 870 The Answer") is a commercial radio station licensed to Glendale, California, United States, and serving Greater Los Angeles and Southern California. Owned by Salem Media Group, KRLA features a conservative talk format, with transmitter sited off El Reposo Drive in Los Angeles, near the Glendale Freeway.

== History ==
=== KIEV 870 ===
In February 1933, the station signed on the air as KIEV. It originally broadcast on 850 kHz as a result of the North American Regional Broadcasting Agreement (NARBA). For most of its early years, KIEV was a daytimer, required to go off the air at sunset.

The station had various formats, including Top 40, country music, big bands and adult standards. Programs included Tomorrow's Heroes with Andrea Speyer, Talk Back with George Putnam, The Swingin' Years with host Chuck Cecil, Grace to You with John MacArthur, horse racing from Santa Anita Park and Hollywood Park Racetrack, and University of Nebraska football.

Salem Communications bought KIEV in 1998 for $33.4 million.

=== KRLA talk (2001–present) ===
Former KRLA logo

On January 1, 2001, 870 AM adopted the KRLA call letters. KWVE 1110 AM, had used those call letters for several decades, beginning in 1959, broadcasting an oldies format.

Weekends on KRLA feature shows on law, pet care and financial advice, as well as brokered programming. On June 14, 2010, KRLA added Glenn Beck's radio show to the weekday lineup, but the show was discontinued several years later. The KRLA-produced Terry Anderson Show aired on Sundays at 9 p.m., until Anderson died on July 7, 2010.

In 2014, rival talk radio station KABC, owned by Cumulus Media, discontinued the Mark Levin and Larry Elder shows. In 2015 Salem Communications added both hosts to its line-up. By June 2015 KRLA's Los Angeles ratings pulled ahead of rival KABC. Salem Communications owns two other talk radio stations in Southern California, 590 KTIE, serving the Inland Empire (Riverside County and San Bernardino County) and 1170 KCBQ serving San Diego.

== Programming ==
Jennifer Horn and Grant Stinchfield host KRLA's morning show; the remainder of the schedule is syndicated, largely from the Salem Radio Network.
