= Myriad Convention Center =

Multi-purpose complex in Oklahoma

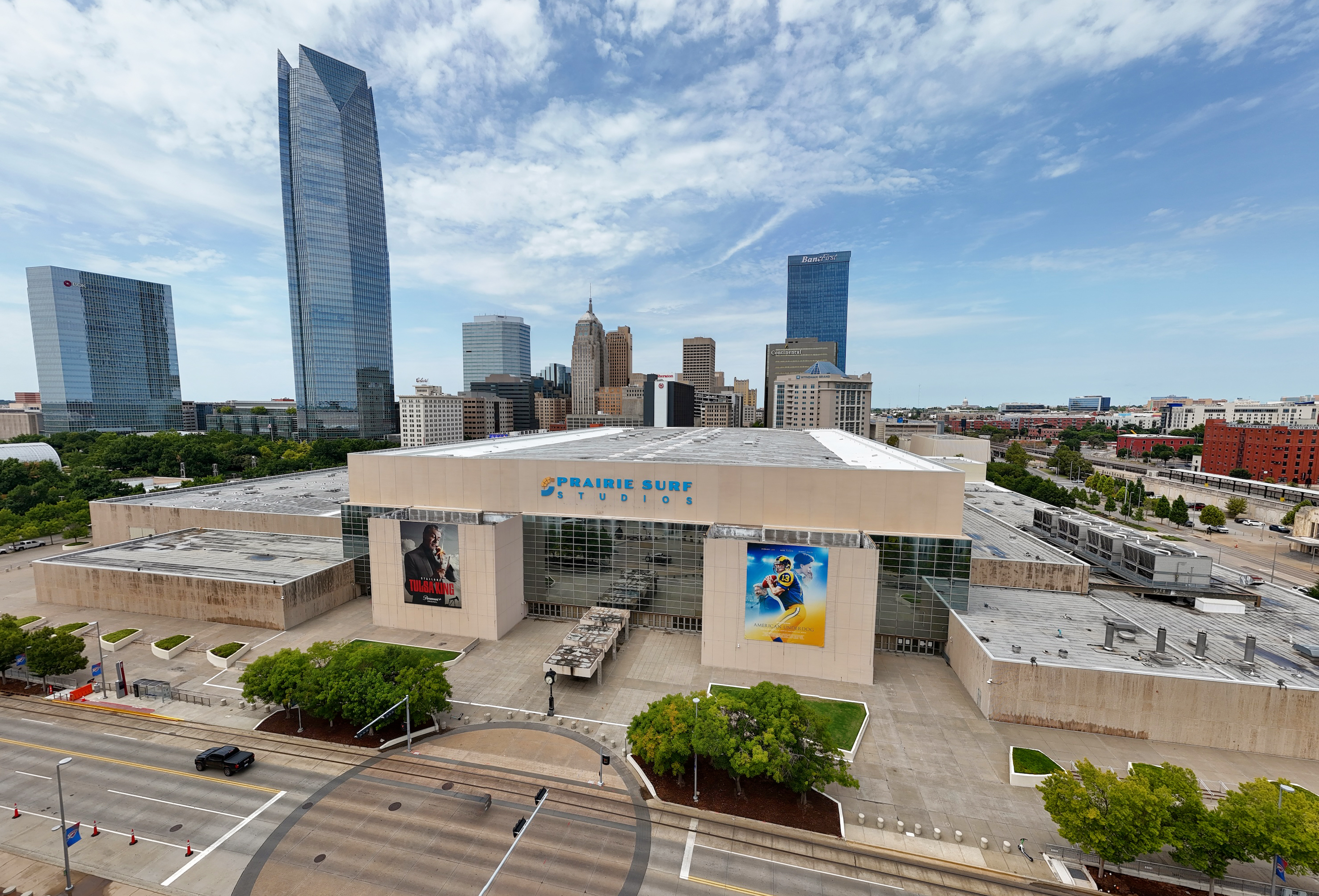
- Interactive map of Myriad Convention Center
- Former names: Myriad Convention Center (1972–2002) Cox Convention Center (2002–2021) Prairie Surf Studios (2021–2026)
- Address: 1 Myriad Gardens; Oklahoma City, OK 73102-9219
- Location: Downtown Oklahoma City
- Coordinates: 35°27′55″N 97°30′52″W
- Owner: City of Oklahoma City
- Operator: SMG
- Public transit: OKC Streetcar Century Center; OKC Streetcar Arena

Construction
- Groundbreaking: 1969
- Opened: November 5, 1972
- Closed: 2025
- Demolished: March 2025–February 2026
- Cost: $23 million ($202 million in 2025 dollars)
- Architects: Bozalis, Dickinson & Roloff
- General contractor: H.A. Lott Inc.

Myriad Convention Center (and later Cox Convention Center) was a film production complex located in downtown Oklahoma City, Oklahoma. It was formerly a convention center and the home of several minor league teams. The convention center was replaced in January 2021 by the Oklahoma City Convention Center. The site was demolished in February 2026 to make room for a new basketball arena for the Oklahoma City Thunder.

== History ==
The facility, known as the Myriad Convention Center, originally was the centerpiece of Oklahoma City's first major urban renewal project, the Pei Plan. In addition to the Convention Center, the project included the removal of blighted sections of the southern downtown area. The project also began the process for the design and construction of the Myriad Botanical Gardens, located directly west of the Myriad. As the Myriad, the facility received a major renovation and expansion. The US$55.8 million project was designed by Glover Bode. Flintco, who served as the renovation's general contractor, began construction in June 1997. The work was completed in August 1999.

It was later named Cox Convention Center via sponsorship with telecommunications company Cox Communications. The facility's primary use was that of large-scale convention and meeting space. It also hosted major concerts, conferences, and other large-scale events. The complex houses multiple meeting rooms, conference and convention space, dining halls, and a 15,000-seat multi-purpose arena. When it opened in 1972, it replaced the Oklahoma State Fair Arena as Oklahoma City's main indoor sports and concert venue. It would retain this status for 30 years until the opening of the Ford Center (now the Paycom Center) in 2002 directly across the street.

As the Cox Convention Center, the facility received another upgrade, budgeted at $4.5 million, to accommodate the Edmonton Oilers' top farm team, the Oklahoma City Barons, which began play in the 2010–11 season.

The arena was home to Oklahoma City Blazers hockey in the 1970s, another Blazers team from 1992 to 2002, the Bricktown Brawlers Indoor Football League team, the Oklahoma City Barons of the American Hockey League, and the Oklahoma City Blue of the NBA G League. The Oklahoma City Cavalry played in the Continental Basketball Association at the convention center from 1990 to 1997. It was also home to the Professional Rodeo Cowboys Association's National Finals Rodeo from 1979 to 1984. The Cox Convention Center also hosted numerous state and college basketball events, including early rounds of the Men's NCAA basketball tournament and also the 2007 and 2009 Big 12 Women's Basketball Tournament and UFC Fight Night: Diaz vs. Guillard on September 16, 2009. The NCAA Men's Division I Indoor Track and Field Championships were held at the arena from 1986 to 1988.

In January 2021, construction was completed for a US$288 million, 500,000 square foot replacement convention center across the street street from Scissortail Park in downtown OKC. The new center was part of OKC's MAPS 3 initiative.

Oklahoma City contracted with Prairie Surf Media to take over the convention center space for sound stages and production offices for their film company. On January 1, 2021, the building was renamed Prairie Surf Studios.

Demolition started in March of 2025. The second half of the demolition project started in December of 2025 and was completed in February 2026. In its place, the Continental Coliseum is being built as a replacement basketball arena to replace the current Paycom Center, located nearby, which is slated to open in 2028.

== Production studio ==
The building became retrofitted into a film production studio in early 2021 under the ownership of Matt Payne and Rachel Cannon. The building had five sound stages, with its largest stage sitting at 35,000 square feet. The studio was used for some of the filming of Killers of the Flower Moon and the first season of Tulsa King. Other productions to take place at the studio included American Underdog and Twisters, amongst other productions.

In September 2023, Prairie Surf Studios launched a creative division that aims to create original projects with Oklahoma-based productions. Some of its first projects include a documentary about Clara Luper. Prairie Surf Creative's first feature film project, a documentary about The Manhattan Project called The Accelerator, debuted at the deadCENTER Film Festival in June 2024.

== Events ==
Prior to the opening of the Ford Center, the Myriad was Oklahoma City's premier sports and entertainment venue.

WCW Thunder aired live from the Myriad Convention Center on February 12, 1998.

=== Concerts ===
List of concerts
- Sonny & Cher – February 18, 1973
- Neil Young – March 1, 1973, with the Stray Gators and March 17, 1991, with Crazy Horse and Sonic Youth
- Elvis Presley & the TCB Band – July 2, 1973, July 8, 1975 and May 29, 1976
- Jerry Lee Lewis – October 6, 1973
- The Beach Boys – May 4, 1975, with Chicago and May 10, 1990, with America and Three Dog Night
- Eric Clapton – August 22, 1975
- The Osmonds – September 3, 1975 and December 18, 1985
- KISS – March 4, 1976, November 15, 1977, March 23, 1983, August 25, 1990, with Slaughter and Winger, September 11, 1996 and April 4, 2000, with Ted Nugent and Skid Row
- Fats Domino – March 6–7, 1976
- The Who – March 15, 1976
- Yes – August 10, 1976, October 3, 1977, June 5, 1979, with Donovan and the Dukes and March 14, 1984
- Neil Diamond – October 10, 1976, February 17, 1987 and November 23, 2001
- Electric Light Orchestra – February 16, 1977, with Steve Hillage and July 3, 1978
- Led Zeppelin – April 3, 1977, with Rick Derringer
- The Eagles – July 6, 1977, with Jimmy Buffett & The Coral Reefer Band, February 14, 1980, with the Amazing Rhythm Aces, October 4, 1994 and January 25–26, 1995
- Alice Cooper – August 13, 1977 and April 14, 1979
- Rod Stewart – November 30, 1977
- Foghat – March 16, 1978
- REO Speedwagon – July 8, 1978, with Rainbow and Ultra, October 3, 1979, January 4, 1981 and August 18–19, 1982, with John Mellencamp
- Kansas – August 12, 1978, with Thin Lizzy and Crawler
- Aerosmith – October 12, 1978, with Exile, February 15, 1986, February 25, 1988, with Dokken, July 14, 1990, June 4, 1993, with Jackyl, December 20, 1997, with Talk Show and December 9, 2001, with the Cult
- Styx – November 3, 1978, February 11, 1981 and May 13, 1983
- Black Sabbath – November 20, 1978, with Van Halen
- The Moody Blues – December 4, 1978, with Jimmie Spheeris and October 6, 1993
- Boston – February 14, 1979, with Sammy Hagar
- Billy Joel – March 19, 1979 and April 11, 1984
- Kenny Rogers – April 3, 1979, with Dottie West and the Oak Ridge Boys, November 22, 1981, with David Frizzell and Shelly West and Gallagher and October 29, 1982, with Larry Gatlin & the Gatlin Brothers Band
- Jethro Tull – April 25, 1979, with UK
- Journey – July 14, 1979, with Thin Lizzy, November 3rd, 1981, and December 4, 1986, with Glass Tiger
- The Bee Gees – August 4, 1979, with the Sweet Inspirations
- Kool & the Gang – October 19, 1979, with Cameo, the Bar-Kays and Mass Production
- Rush – February 1, 1983, with Max Webster, April 25, 1981, March 4, 1983, with Golden Earring, May 1, 1986, with Blue Öyster Cult, January 23, 1988, with Tommy Shaw and May 25, 1992, with Mr. Big
- Cheap Trick – April 8, 1980, with the Babys
- Little River Band – June 24, 1980, with Pure Prairie League
- Queen – August 8, 1980, with Dakota and August 27, 1982, with Billy Squier
- Fleetwood Mac – August 22, 1980, with Rocky Burnette and September 26, 1982, with Men at Work
- Jackson Browne – September 17, 1980 and August 23, 1983
- Elton John – October 9, 1980, with Judie Tzuke, September 25, 1984, November 19, 1997 and October 30, 1999
- The Cars – October 10, 1980, with the Motels
- Bob Seger & the Silver Bullet Band – October 21, 1980
- Conway Twitty – May 16, 1981 and May 15, 1982, with Ronnie McDowell
- The Jacksons – July 10, 1981
- Barry Manilow – September 21, 1981 and January 4, 1985
- Loverboy – November 3, 1981
- The J. Geils Band – April 18, 1982, with the Jon Butcher Axis
- Genesis – August 15, 1982
- Van Halen – September 21, 1982, with After the Fire, June 15–16, 1984, with the Velcros, July 16, 1986, with Bachman–Turner Overdrive, February 2, 1992, with Baby Animals and October 3–4, 1995
- Olivia Newton-John – September 22, 1982, with t.he Tom Scott Quartet
- Tom Petty and the Heartbreakers – January 26, 1983, with Nick Lowe & His Noise To Go and November 4, 1991, with Chris Whitley
- Stevie Nicks – September 17, 1983, with Joe Walsh and April 16, 1986, with Opus
- The Police – November 20, 1983, with UB40
- Duran Duran – April 9, 1984
- Tina Turner – October 25, 1984, with Mr. Mister and October 25, 1985
- Iron Maiden – March 2, 1985
- Chicago – April 3, 1985
- AC/DC – October 10, 1985, with Yngwie Malmsteen, February 7, 1991, with King's X and August 22, 1996
- John Mellencamp – February 12, 1986
- Heart – May 4, 1986 and September 11, 1987
- Run–D.M.C. – August 1, 1986, with the Beastie Boys and LL Cool J
- Bon Jovi – February 24, 1987 and April 11, 1989
- Bad Company – June 7, 1987 and March 23, 1989
- Mötley Crüe – June 30, 1987, with Whitesnake and January 3, 1990
- The Beastie Boys – July 23, 1987, with Run–D.M.C.
- Whitney Houston – November 4, 1987, with Kenny G and May 30, 1991, with After 7
- Metallica – November 30, 1988, with Queensrÿche; January 24, 1992; and May 11, 1997, with Corrosion of Conformity
- Poison – January 22, 1989, with Tesla
- Cinderella – March 28, 1989, with Winger and The BulletBoys
- Tesla – September 13, 1989
- R.E.M. – October 28, 1989, with Pylon
- Bad English – November 16, 1989
- Jimmy Buffett & The Coral Reefer Band – January 20, 1990, with Little Feat and Zachary Richard
- Whitesnake – May 1, 1990
- Janet Jackson – July 3, 1990, with Chuckii Booker
- The Black Crowes – July 14, 1990 and February 10, 1993
- MC Hammer – August 10, 1990
- ZZ Top – December 13, 1990, with the Jeff Healey Band and November 12, 1999, with Lynyrd Skynyrd and the Screamin' Cheetah Wheelies
- Don Dokken – January 30, 1991
- Jane's Addiction – February 1, 2003
- Scorpions – March 26, 1991, with Trixter
- Hank Williams Jr. – April 28, 1991, with Tanya Tucker and Mark Collie
- Queensrÿche – April 30, 1991
- Anthrax – October 10, 1991, with Public Enemy
- Van Halen February 2, 1992
- Pantera – March 22, 1992 and March 20, 2001, with Nothingface
- Bryan Adams – April 2, 1992
- Guns N' Roses – April 6, 1992, with the Smashing Pumpkins
- Megadeth – December 10, 1992, with Pantera and Suicidal Tendencies
- Lynyrd Skynyrd – October 5, 1995
- The Smashing Pumpkins – November 23, 1996, with Garbage
- Bush – May 6, 1997, with Veruca Salt
- Garth Brooks – July 3–5, 1997
- Prince & The New Power Generation – August 5, 1997
- Page & Plant – June 4, 1998
- Shania Twain – October 28, 1998, with Leahy
- NSYNC – April 9, 1999, with Divine and Tatyana Ali
- The Rolling Stones – April 10, 1999, with Jonny Lang
- KoЯn – February 24, 2000, with Staind and Mindless Self Indulgence
- Red Hot Chili Peppers – April 29, 2000, with Foo Fighters and March 12, 2007, with Gnarls Barkley
- The Dixie Chicks – August 5, 2000
- Tim McGraw & Faith Hill – October 15, 2000
- Creed – October 18, 2000
- KJYO KJ–103's Jingle Ball – December 17, 2000
- MTV Total Request Live Tour – August 2, 2001
- Matchbox 20 – September 12, 2001, with Train
- Slipknot & System of a Down – October 5, 2001, with No One, American Head Charge and Rammstein
- Tool – October 23, 2001, with Tricky and November 16, 2002, with Meshuggah
- Family Values Tour – November 11, 2001
- Vince Gill – December 2, 2001
- Kid Rock & Twisted Brown Trucker – April 21, 2002
- Music as a Weapon – April 8, 2003
- John Mayer – November 14, 2003 and February 3, 2007
- Trans-Siberian Orchestra – November 21, 2004
- Audioslave – October 14, 2005, with Seether and 30 Seconds to Mars
- Nickelback – March 7, 2006, with Chevelle and Trapt and September 11, 2009, with Hinder, Papa Roach and Saving Abel
- Brave Combo – December 31, 2006
- KBRU 94.7's The Buzz Fest – April 13, 2007
- Newsboys – April 21, 2007, with Kutless and Stellar Kart
- tobyMac & the Diverse City Band – April 20, 2007 and November 23, 2008, with Relient K, Family Force 5 and B. Reith
- Three Days Grace – November 9, 2007, with Breaking Benjamin, Seether and Red
- Ronnie Milsap – November 10, 2007
- R. Kelly – December 6, 2007, with Keyshia Cole, J. Holiday and Ne-Yo
- The New Year's Eve Freakout Fest – December 31, 2007, December 31, 2008, December 31, 2009 and December 31, 2010
- Gaither Homecoming – March 19, 2009
- Lil Wayne – March 23, 2009, with T-Pain, Keri Hilson and Gym Class Heroes
- The All-American Rejects – November 24, 2009, with Taking Back Sunday
- Alegría – December 22–26, 2010
- Leeland – July 2, 2011
- American Idol Live! – July 19, 2011
- BarlowGirl – November 25, 2011
- The Barb Wire Dolls – April 13, 2012
- Mindless Behavior – January 26, 2013
- Casting Crowns – October 23, 2014, with Mandisa and Sidewalk Prophets

=== Other events ===
- National Finals Rodeo (1979–1984)
- 1983 Billy Graham Oklahoma Crusade at the arena
- NBA and NHL exhibition games
- 1989 U.S. Olympic Festival events
- Boxing
- Tennis
- UFC Fight Night: Diaz vs. Guillard – September 16, 2009
- Indoor Track meets
- American Bycycle Association: Grand Nationals
- First and second-round games for the 1994 and 1998 NCAA Men's Division I Basketball Championship (Bryce Drew's famous buzzer beater took place here during the 1998 tournament)
- Izumicon (anime convention)
- Talk show host Phil Donahue taped his show in the Great Hall of the Myriad for a week in 1981
- Professional wrestling (Mid-South Wrestling/Universal Wrestling Federation, World Championship Wrestling, World Wrestling Entertainment, and Ring of Honor)
- OKC Oilfield Expo
- It hosted the beatification of Stanley Rother on September 23, 2017, the first native-born American to be proclaimed a martyr of the Catholic Church.
- North American Youth Congress 2015 overflow seating was provided at the convention center after selling out the neighboring Chesapeake Energy Arena.

== Transportation ==
The Prairie Surf Studios is served by the Oklahoma City Streetcar at Century Center station.

Preceding station	EMBARK	Following station
Business District One-way operation	Downtown Loop	Bricktown Next clockwise
Myriad Gardens One-way operation	Bricktown Loop	Bricktown Next clockwise

Events and tenants
Preceded by SpiritBank Event Center (as the Tulsa 66ers)	Home of the Oklahoma City Blue; 2014–2020	Succeeded by TBD
Preceded by Rose Garden Arena	Home of the Oklahoma Wranglers; 2000–2001	Succeeded by Franchise folded
Preceded by Ford Center	Home of the Oklahoma City Yard Dawgs; 2009–2010	Succeeded by Franchise folded
Preceded by Rexall Place (as the Edmonton Road Runners)	Home of the Oklahoma City Barons; 2010–2015	Succeeded by Rabobank Arena (as the Bakersfield Condors)
