= Paycom Center =

Arena in Oklahoma City, Oklahoma, U.S.

- Loud City; The Thunderdome

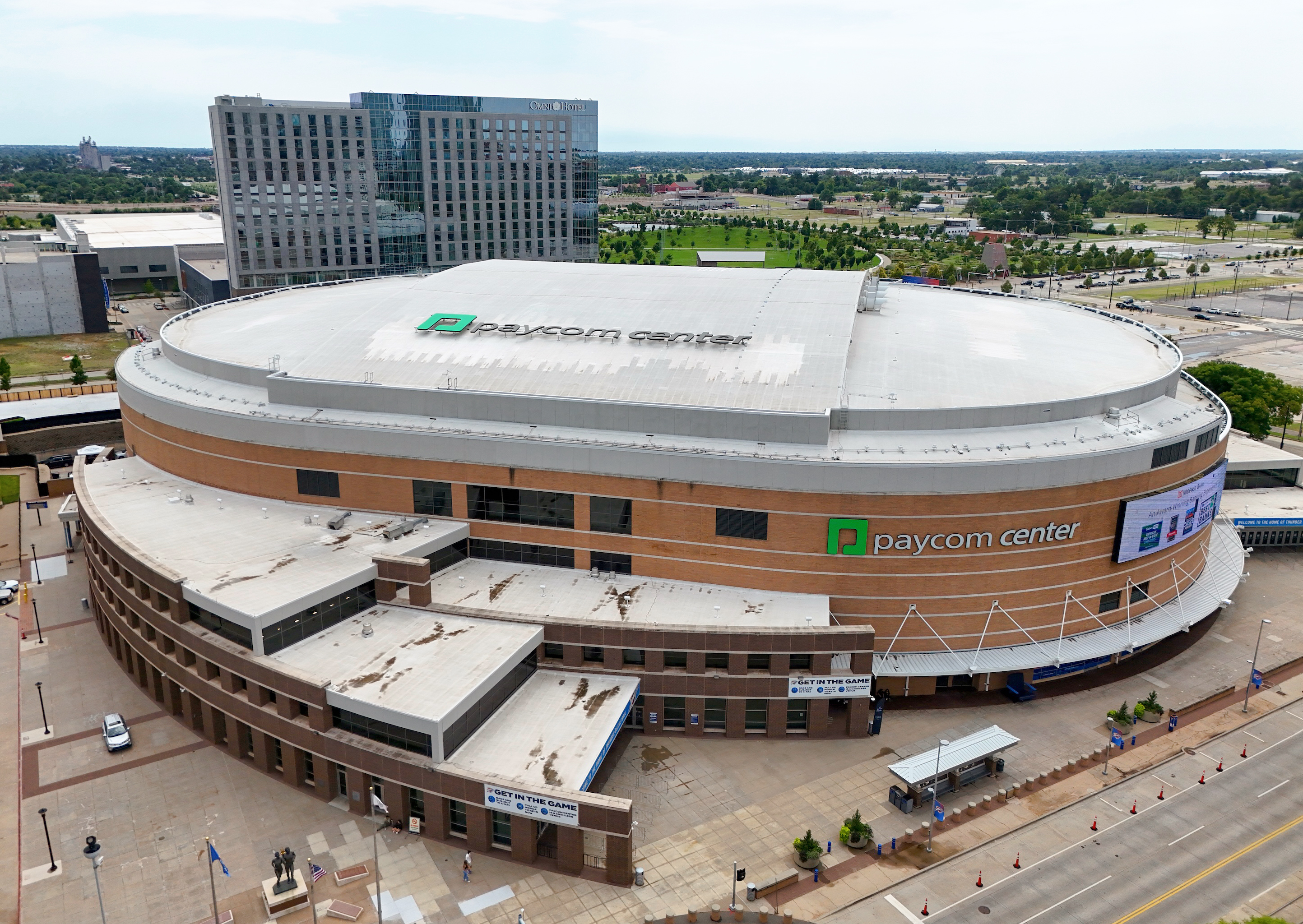
- Paycom Center in 2024 (rear)

- Location in Oklahoma Location in the United States
- Former names: Ford Center (2002–2010); Oklahoma City Arena (2010–2011); Chesapeake Energy Arena (2011–2021)
- Address: 100 West Reno Avenue
- Location: Oklahoma City, Oklahoma, U.S.
- Coordinates: 35°27′48″N 97°30′54″W
- Owner: City of Oklahoma City
- Operator: ASM Global
- Capacity: Basketball: 18,203; Hockey: 15,152; Concerts: 16,591; Wrestling/Boxing/MMA: 16,757
- Public transit: Heartland Flyer; OKC Streetcar Arena

Construction
- Groundbreaking: May 11, 1999
- Opened: June 8, 2002
- Cost: US$89.2 million ($160 million in 2025 dollars)
- Architects: The Benham Companies, LLC. Sink Combs Dethlefs
- Services engineers: M-E Engineers, Inc.
- General contractor: Flintco Construction Co.

Tenants
- Oklahoma City Blazers (CHL) (2002–2009); Oklahoma City Yard Dawgz (AF2) (2004–2008); New Orleans/Oklahoma City Hornets (NBA) (2005–2007); Oklahoma City Thunder (NBA) (2008–present); Oklahoma City Blue (NBAGL) (2021–present); Oklahoma Freedom (PBR) (2022–2023); Oklahoma Wildcatters (PBR) (2024–present)

Website
- paycomcenter.com

Paycom Center (originally known as the Ford Center from 2002 to 2010, Oklahoma City Arena from 2010 to 2011, and Chesapeake Energy Arena from 2011 to 2021) is an arena located in downtown Oklahoma City, Oklahoma, United States. It opened in 2002 and since 2008 has served as the home venue for the National Basketball Association (NBA)'s Oklahoma City Thunder, and NBA G League's Oklahoma City Blue. Previously, the arena was home to the Oklahoma City Blazers of the Central Hockey League (CHL) from 2002 until the team folded in July 2009, and the Oklahoma City Yard Dawgz of AF2 from 2004 to 2009 when the team moved to the Cox Convention Center (later Prairie Surf Studios; now demolished). In addition to its use as a sports venue, Paycom Center hosts concerts, family and social events, conventions, ice shows, and civic events. The arena is owned by the city and operated by the ASM Global property management company and has 18,203 seats in the basketball configuration, 15,152 for hockey, and can seat up to 16,591 for concerts.

From 2005 to 2007, the arena also served as the temporary home for the New Orleans Hornets of the NBA when the Hornets were forced to play games elsewhere following extensive damage to New Orleans Arena and the city of New Orleans from Hurricane Katrina. During the two seasons in Oklahoma City, the team was known as the New Orleans/Oklahoma City Hornets. The response from fans while the Hornets played in Oklahoma City was an impetus to the city being discussed prior to 2008 for the location of a future NBA team, either by relocation or expansion.

== History ==
The Paycom Center is owned by the City of Oklahoma City and was opened on June 8, 2002, three years after construction began. The original Ford Center name came from a naming rights deal with the Oklahoma Ford Dealers group which represented the marketing efforts of the state's Ford dealerships, rather than the Ford Motor Company itself.

The facility was the premier component of the city's 1993 Capital Improvement Program, known as Metropolitan Area Projects (MAPS), which financed new and upgraded sports, entertainment, cultural, and convention facilities primarily in the downtown section with a temporary 1-cent sales tax assessed. Despite the "metropolitan" moniker of the improvement program, the tax was only assessed inside city limits.

Originally billed and marketed as a "state-of-the-art" facility, it was only built to the minimum NBA and NHL specifications. The arena was built without luxury amenities because of local concerns about expenditures on an arena without a major-league tenant already in place. However, it could easily be retrofitted with "buildout" amenities and improvements if a professional sports team announced it would relocate to the city.

A plan for such buildout improvements began in 2007 in the wake of the acquisition of the Seattle SuperSonics by an Oklahoma-City-based ownership group in October 2006. Originally, city officials had hoped to include Oklahoma City Arena buildout improvements as part of a planned 2009 "MAPS 3" initiative. However, given the impending relocation decision of the Sonics ownership group in late 2007, the City Council of Oklahoma City placed a sales tax initiative on the city election ballot on March 4, 2008. This initiative was passed by a 62% to 38% margin, and extended a prior one-cent sales tax for 15 months to fund $121 million in budgeted improvements to the arena, as well as fund a separate practice facility for a relocated franchise.

Subsequent to the ballot initiative, City officials and Sonics ownership announced a preliminary agreement to move the Sonics franchise to Oklahoma City and the Ford Center. The deal included a provision for $1.6 million in annual rents to the city for use of the Ford Center (including marketing rights of luxury seating areas for all NBA and most non-NBA events), and a $409,000 annual supplemental payment in exchange for a transfer of arena naming rights and associated revenue to the Sonics franchise. The franchise move was approved by NBA ownership on April 18, 2008.

On August 26, 2010, the franchise, by then renamed the Oklahoma City Thunder, announced that it had begun negotiating naming rights to its home arena with new potential partners. The facility was called the Ford Center and signage throughout the building remained intact during the negotiation period. The Thunder previously had discussions with the Oklahoma Ford Dealers; however, a new agreement could not be reached. As a result of the failed negotiation with the Oklahoma Ford Dealers, the Thunder decided to terminate the existing naming rights agreement, which was allowed under the original contract. On October 21, 2010, because of the ongoing negotiation for the naming rights for the arena, and because of its failed negotiation with the Oklahoma Ford Dealers, it was announced that the arena would be called the Oklahoma City Arena. The new name was used temporarily until naming rights were settled.

On July 22, 2011, a 12-year naming rights partnership between the Oklahoma City Thunder and Chesapeake Energy Corporation was announced. The agreement had an initial annual cost of $3 million with a 3% annual escalation. As part of the deal, the arena was renamed Chesapeake Energy Arena. Also, Chesapeake Energy was allowed to place its branding throughout the building, on prominent premium places on the high-definition scoreboard, and on new state-of-the-art interior and exterior digital signs. Most of the new signs were in place before the start of the Thunder's 2011–12 season. The company filed for chapter 11 bankruptcy on June 28, 2020, with a debt of $9 billion, with the effect on the arena's naming rights not then known. However, on April 20, 2021, the company terminated the deal as part of its corporate restructuring. The arena retained its name during the Thunder's search for a new sponsor.

On July 27, 2021, it was announced that locally-based Paycom would acquire the naming rights for the arena for a 15-year period, renaming it Paycom Center. On July 14, 2025, it was announced that Paycom would end their naming rights deal when the Thunder move into their new arena in 2028.

=== Seating capacity ===
Basketball seating capacity at the arena has adjusted with the venue configuration:

Years	Capacity
2002–2006	19,163
2006–2008	19,164
2008–2009	19,136
2009–present	18,203

== Arena information ==
The 581,000-square-foot (54,000 m^{2}) facility seats up to 19,711 on three seating levels with a fourth added during concerts and features 3,380 club seats, seven party suites, and 49 private suites. It also features The OLD NO. 7 Club, a full-service restaurant and bar. Several other exclusive dining options are also available at The Pub, a 1,576-square-foot (146.4 m^{2}) "Irish Pub" themed bar, and at The Courtside Club, a 6,198-square-foot (575.8 m^{2}) restaurant and lounge area, as well as at the Victory Club, Sunset Carvery, and the new Terrace Lounges.

=== Improvements ===
On March 4, 2008, the citizens of Oklahoma City passed a $121.6 million initiative designed to renovate and expand the Paycom Center and to build a practice facility for the relocated Seattle SuperSonics team which is now known as the Oklahoma City Thunder. Financing consists of a temporary 15-month, 1-cent sales tax that will be paid by Oklahoma City residents and shoppers beginning January 1, 2009.

The city held the temporary tax initiative in March 2008 to facilitate the relocation of the NBA's Seattle SuperSonics or another relocation franchise. It is expected that the refurbishment will turn the Paycom Center into a top-tier NBA facility.

Some of the planned upgrades to the Paycom Center include upscale restaurants, clubs, additional suites (including so-called 'bunker suites'), office space, Kid's Zone, additional concessions, flooring upgrades, an integrated video and scoring system from Daktronics, view lounges, and upgraded 'general use' locker rooms. NBA specific amenities include 'NBA ONLY' locker rooms and facilities, a practice court, media broadcast facilities, lighting, and sound, an NBA press room, an onsite NBA and team store, and ticket/staff rooms. It is anticipated that the Oklahoma City Thunder team will lease the new office space.

Renovation work on the arena was delayed due to a sales tax receipt shortfall during the 2008–10 economic crisis; eventual tax receipts totaled $103.5 million rather than the projected $121 million. The shortfall was accommodated by revising plans for certain features of the arena expansion project, including limiting the size of a new glass entryway, and eliminating a practice court planned for above the delivery entrance of the arena. Major construction work on the arena expansion was also delayed from the summer of 2010 to the summer of 2011. Similar revisions were made to the plans for the Thunder's separate practice facility, for a total cost savings of approximately $14 million. The Thunder's practice facility completion date was similarly pushed back to approximately March 2011.

In September 2023, a new round of renovations came to the arena, including a new 28,000-pound scoreboard with wraparound video display that cost $7.5 million.

== Events ==
The Paycom Center hosts a number of games and events from Oklahoma City University, the University of Oklahoma, and Oklahoma State University along with those from local high schools and post-secondary organizations. It is also used for other events, including major concert tours, conventions, National Hockey League preseason and exhibition games, and notably professional wrestling shows.

=== College sports ===
It hosted the 2007 Big 12 men's basketball tournament for the first time in 2007 (with the 2007 Big 12 women's basketball tournament held across the street at Cox Convention Center). The venue has hosted the NCAA Men's Basketball First and Second Round on several occasions (including 2010 , 2016, and 2026) and is the permanent host of the All-College Basketball Classic. It hosted the 2009 Big 12 Conference Men's Basketball Tournament. In March 2014, the arena played host to the NCAA Division I Wrestling Championships.

Starting in 2024, it has hosted the men's basketball portion of Bedlam Series as non-conference game at a neutral site.

=== NBA ===
==== New Orleans Hornets ====
After the city of New Orleans, and surrounding area was devastated by Hurricane Katrina in 2005, the NBA reached a deal with the City of Oklahoma City which allowed the New Orleans Hornets franchise to temporarily move to the Paycom Center (then known as the Ford Center). The New Orleans Hornets leased the facility for the 2005–06 season and exercised the option with the city to extend for the 2006–07 season. The arena acquired a $200,000 renovation (primarily to lighting and sound) as part of the Hornets' lease. During this time, the team was known as the "New Orleans/Oklahoma City Hornets", giving Oklahoma City credit for hosting the 'home team'. The Hornets played their last game in Oklahoma City on October 9, 2007, a preseason game.

The hosting of the Hornets arguably gave Oklahoma City the edge it needed to land on the radar of professional sports. Long being considered by many as too small to host a major-league team for a variety of reasons, support for the Hornets during their two-year stay caught the attention of the NBA and other sports leagues. Attendance for Hornets games at the Paycom Center (then known as the Ford Center) averaged 18,716 fans in 2005–06 (36 games) and 17,951 fans (35 games) in 2006–07. David Stern was quoted as stating that "Oklahoma City was at the top of the relocation list of cities" and during the Hornets' last home game he all but assured local fans that "I look forward to the day that the NBA will return to Oklahoma City."

==== Oklahoma City Thunder ====
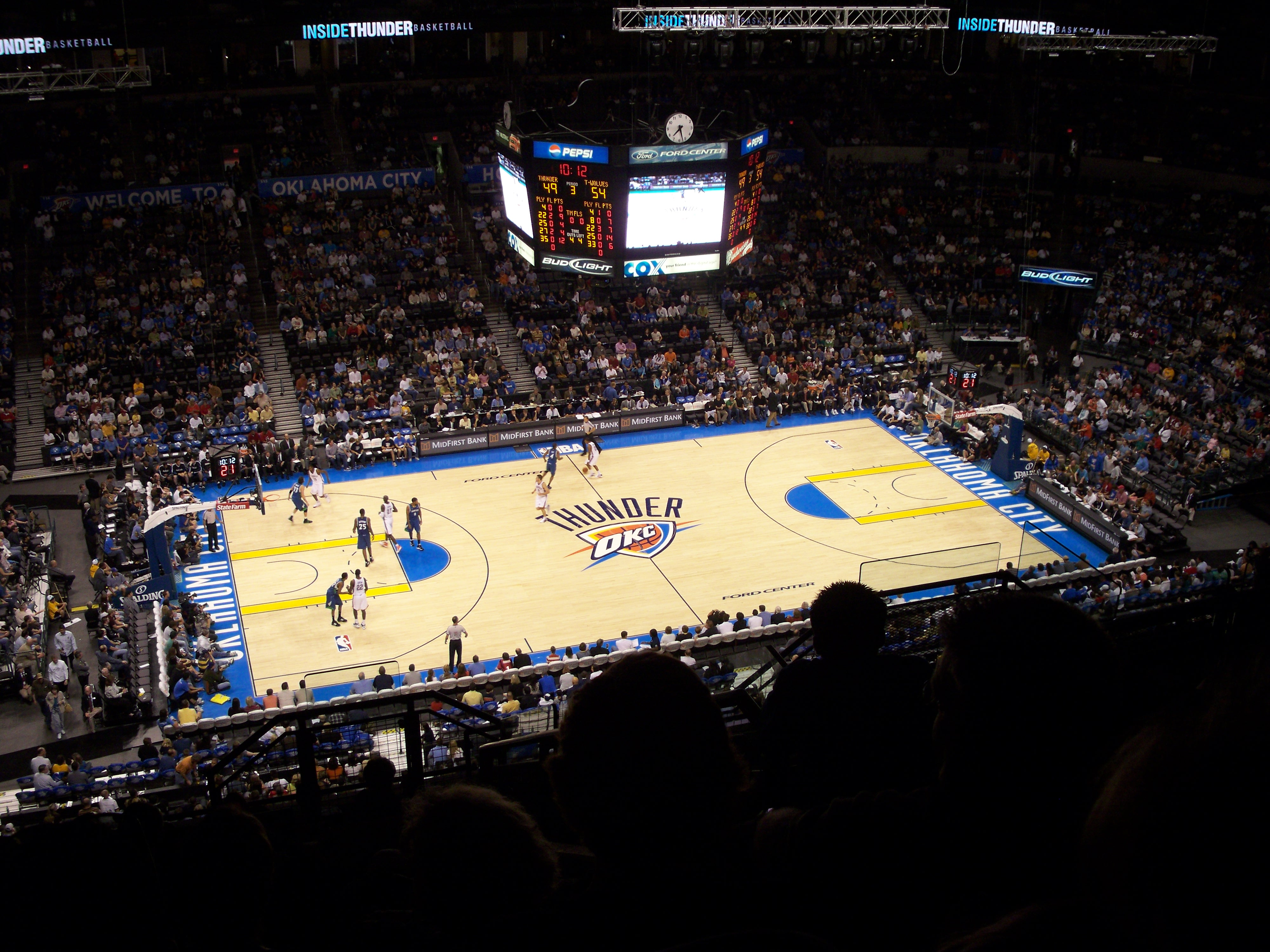
Oklahoma City hosted and defeated Minnesota for their first win.

Oklahoma City billionaire investor Clay Bennett of the Professional Basketball Club LLC purchased the Seattle SuperSonics and Seattle Storm franchises from Howard Schultz in 2006. The deal included a provision that gave Seattle officials one year to solve its arena situation or allow Bennett to seek relocation.

After an April 2008 league approval, it was announced on July 2, 2008, that the Sonics franchise would be relocating to Oklahoma City and would play at what was then the Ford Center. The agreement retires the "SuperSonics" moniker, color, and logos, possibly to be used by a future NBA team in Seattle. On September 2, 2008, the team announced they would be called the Oklahoma City Thunder.

The Thunder have been a playoff mainstay since arriving in Oklahoma. Chesapeake Energy Arena hosted playoff games every year between 2010 and 2014, as well as 2016. In 2012, the arena became host of the NBA Finals for the first time, when the Thunder went up against the Miami Heat for the league championship. The Thunder won Game 1 at Chesapeake Energy Arena in convincing fashion, but lost the last four games and the championship to the Heat.

On March 11, 2020, a game between the Thunder and the Utah Jazz that was to be held at the arena was initially postponed after Jazz center Rudy Gobert was placed on the injury list due to an illness. After it was learned that Gobert tested positive for COVID-19, the NBA announced that the remainder of the 2019–20 season would be suspended immediately following the conclusion of that night's games. This incident would eventually result in the cancellation of all sports events throughout North America and the rest of the world, as the COVID-19 outbreak had been declared as a pandemic by WHO earlier that day.

The NBA Finals would return to Paycom Center in 2025, where the Thunder defeated the Indiana Pacers in seven games to win the franchise's first NBA championship since moving to Oklahoma City.

=== MMA and professional wrestling ===
The arena has hosted many WWE events such as Raw, SmackDown, and Unforgiven 2005. Raw came to the Chesapeake Energy Arena on September 25, 2006, and March 1, 2010, with Cheech & Chong appearing as the evening's guest hosts. During the show on September 25, 2006, the opening of the show suffered a blackout, but lights were restored shortly after the night began.

On June 25, 2017, the arena held its first UFC event for UFC Fight Night: Chiesa vs. Lee. The UFC returned to the arena nine years later for UFC Fight Night: du Plessis vs. Usman.

=== Other events ===
The Professional Bull Riders (PBR) held a Premier Series event at the venue from 2002 through 2006, and again from 2009 through 2022. In 2007 and 2008, the PBR's Challenger Tour Finals event was held there. In 2022 and 2023, Paycom Center was the home venue of the PBR's Oklahoma Freedom during the PBR Team Series season held in the summer and autumn. In 2024, the Freedom moved to Florida and Oklahoma acquired a new team, the Wildcatters. Said team now call Paycom Center home.

The Center held the 2015 North American Youth Congress (NAYC) of the United Pentecostal Church International. The event sold out the arena, requiring the neighboring Cox Convention Center to be used as overflow with video streamed from across the street.

== Replacement ==
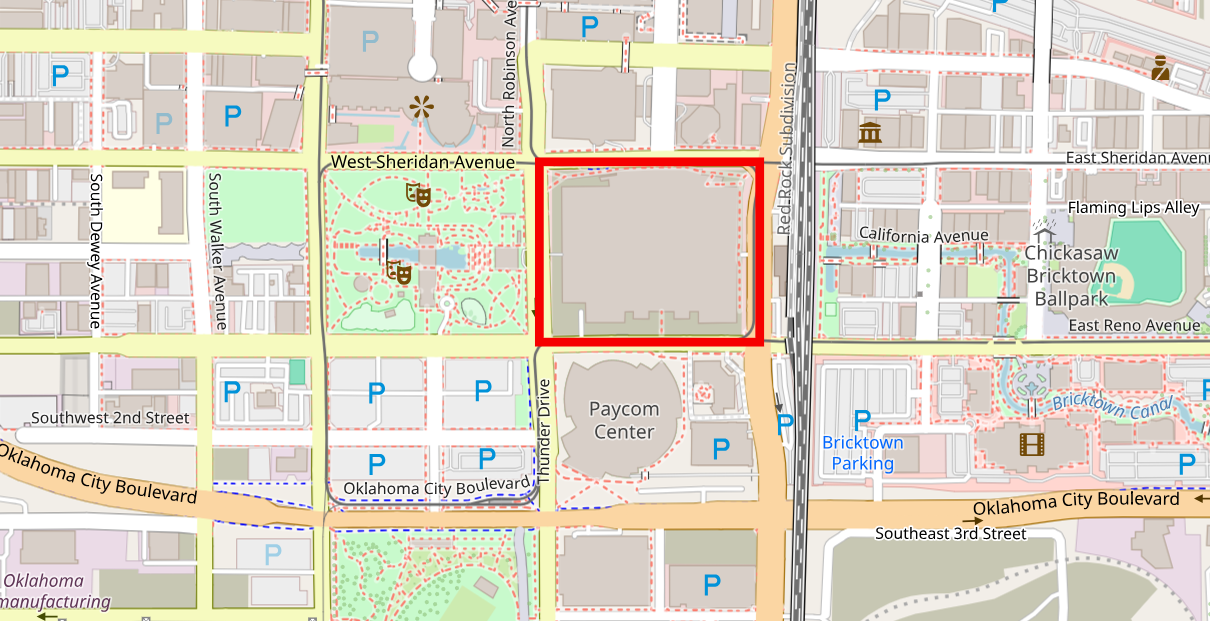
Site of the under-construction Continental Coliseum. The Paycom Center is directly south.

The initial term of the 2008 use license agreement with the Oklahoma City Thunder expired in 2023. The Thunder exercised an option to extend the agreement for three years to allow time for the city to develop plans for a new arena. On December 12, 2023, Oklahoma City voters approved a 72-month extension of a one-cent sales tax to build a new, publicly owned downtown arena. This arena is slated to open no later than the opening of the 2029-30 NBA season, and the Thunder have committed to remain in Oklahoma City for 25 years following their move into the new arena.

On May 17, 2024, the site of the former Cox Convention Center (originally Myriad Convention Center) was revealed as the location of the new arena. The property, located north of the Paycom Center across Reno Ave., is owned by the city and was being leased to Prairie Surf Studios. In December 2023, the city notified Prairie Surf Studios that its lease would not be renewed when it expired on December 31, 2025. In June 2024, the city and Prairie Surf Studios agreed to terminate the lease one year early to allow demolition to begin in early 2025. The city plans to work with the team towards a " 'more aggressive' target schedule" to open the new arena as early as June 2028. Once the new arena has opened, the Paycom Center will likely be converted to some other type of property.

== Transportation ==
Paycom Center is served by the Oklahoma City Streetcar at Arena station.

Preceding station	EMBARK	Following station
Santa Fe Hub One-way operation	Downtown Loop	Scissortail Park Next clockwise
Santa Fe Hub One-way operation	Bricktown Loop	Scissortail Park Next clockwise

Events and tenants
Preceded by KeyArena (as Seattle SuperSonics)	Home of the Oklahoma City Thunder; 2008–present	Succeeded by New Oklahoma City Arena
Preceded by Cox Convention Center	Home of the Oklahoma City Blazers; 2002–2009	Succeeded by last arena
Preceded by first arena	Home of the Oklahoma City Yard Dawgz; 2004–2008	Succeeded by Cox Convention Center
Preceded by New Orleans Arena	Home of the New Orleans/Oklahoma City Hornets; 2005–2007	Succeeded by New Orleans Arena
