= Continental Coliseum =

Arena in Oklahoma City

- Conceptual rendering
- Interactive map of Continental Coliseum
- Former names: New Oklahoma City Arena (planning)
- Location: Oklahoma City, Oklahoma, U.S.
- Coordinates: 35°27′55.3″N 97°30′53.7″W
- Owner: City of Oklahoma City
- Operator: Legends Global

Construction
- Groundbreaking: March 26, 2026
- Opened: June 2028 (planned)
- Cost: $1 billion
- Architect: Manica
- Main contractors: Mortenson; Flintco

Tenant
- Oklahoma City Thunder (2028–)

Continental Coliseum is an arena in Oklahoma City, Oklahoma, scheduled to open in 2028. It will be home to the Oklahoma City Thunder of the National Basketball Association. It will be owned by the Oklahoma City government and operated by Legends Global.

== History ==
When the Seattle SuperSonics relocated to Oklahoma City in 2008, team games were played at the then-named Ford Center. Since it was designed to meet minimum NBA/NHL standards, multiple renovations have occurred to bring it up to date, with some of the upgrades including seat replacement, expanded concourses, scoreboard replacement, and locker room expansion. On December 12, 2023, Oklahoma City voters voted overwhelmingly in favor of constructing a new arena with an approval rate of 71%. On May 21, 2024, the Oklahoma City Council approved funding for the new arena. Funding will come from three sources:

- $78 million from MAPS 4
- $50 million from PBCS&E
- a minimum of $772 million, financed through the 72-month, one-cent special sales tax
- Final cost is $900 million, but projections estimate $990 million to $1 billion.

On October 22, 2024, Manica was chosen to be the architect of the new arena. On March 11, 2025, the construction firms of Mortenson and Flintco were chosen to build the new arena. The arena will be built on the city-owned site of Prairie Surf Studios, formerly the Cox Convention Center, across the street from the current Paycom Center. Demolition began in Spring 2025 and was set to continue through September. The second phase of the demolition project started in December 2025 and is expected to be completed by Spring 2026. On March 24, 2026, locally based petroleum and natural gas company Continental Resources bought the naming rights. Groundbreaking took place on March 26, 2026.
