= Reynolds Center =

Multi-purpose arena in Tulsa, Oklahoma, US

Donald W. Reynolds Center
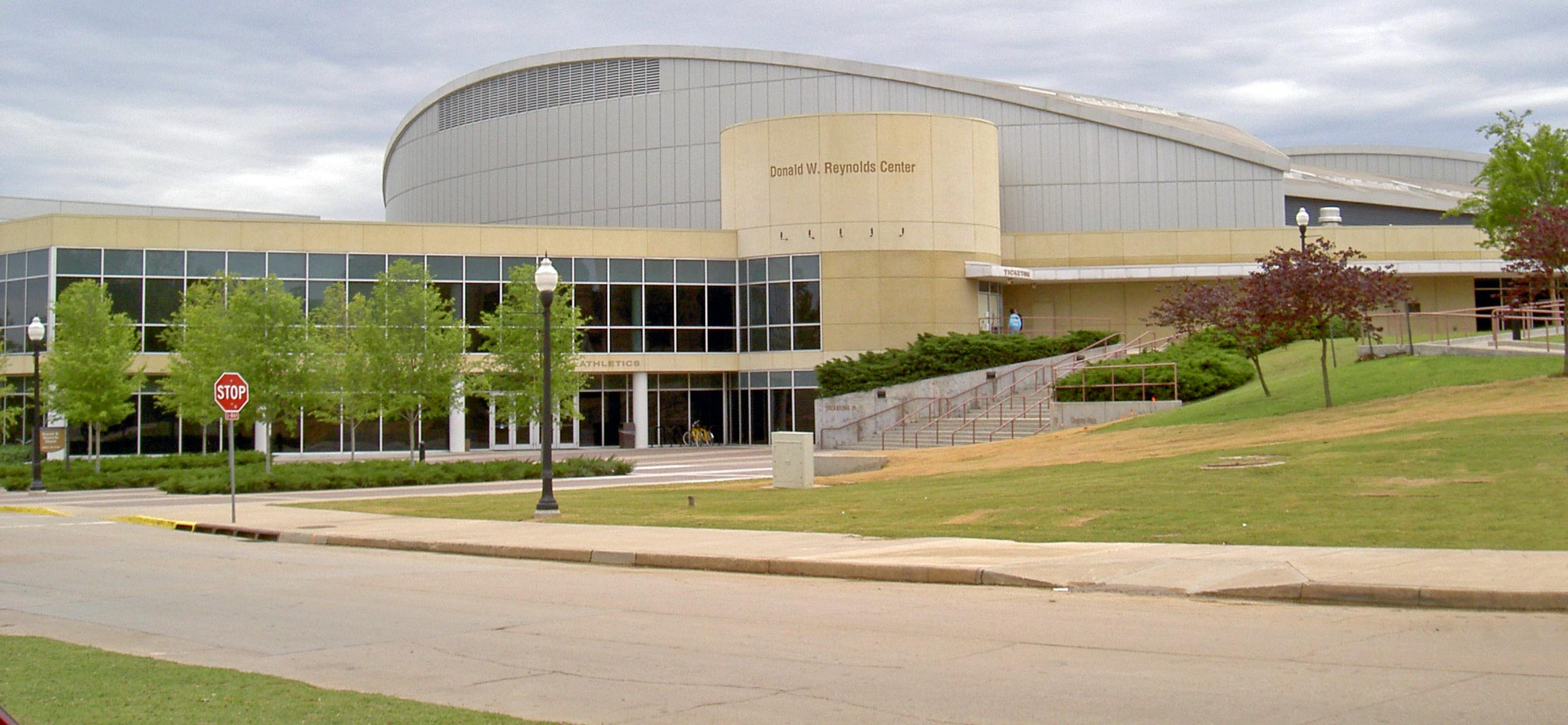
- Interactive map of Donald W. Reynolds Center
- Location: 800 South Tucker Drive; Tulsa, OK 74104
- Coordinates: 36°8′55″N 95°56′31″W
- Owner: University of Tulsa
- Operator: University of Tulsa
- Capacity: 8,355
- Surface: Multi-surface

Construction
- Groundbreaking: April 30, 1997
- Opened: December 17, 1998
- Cost: $28 million ($54.1 million in 2025 dollars)
- Architect: HOK Sport
- Structural engineer: Walter P Moore
- Services engineers: M-E Engineers, Inc.
- General contractor: Flintco, Inc.

Tenant
- Tulsa Golden Hurricane

Donald W. Reynolds Center is an 8,355-seat multi-purpose arena in Tulsa, Oklahoma. Designed by HOK Sport (now known as Populous Co.), the arena opened in 1998 and is named for Donald W. Reynolds. Located on the University of Tulsa campus, it is home to the Golden Hurricane basketball and volleyball teams.

== History ==
The facility's first basketball game took place on December 29, 1998, when the Tulsa Golden Hurricane faced the Cleveland State Vikings. The home team came away with a 79–51 victory in front of a sellout crowd. The Hurricane men's team proceeded to sell-out six of the next seven games played in the Reynolds Center and posted an overall 7–1 record in their inaugural season. In 14 seasons, Tulsa basketball has compiled a 182–53 record at the Reynolds Center for a .774 winning percentage through the 2012–2013. Tulsa has played in front of 41 sellout crowds.

In the first season of Golden Hurricane basketball at the arena, Tulsa averaged 8,282 fans for eight games. Tulsa's next highest home attendance average came in 2002–2003, when the Hurricane played in front of an average of 8,250 fans for 14 regular season home games.

== Notable events ==
The Reynolds Center played host to the 2001–2002 and 2002–2003 Western Athletic Conference men's basketball tournaments.

Since opening, the Reynolds Center has hosted a Reba McEntire concert, NAIA national basketball tournament and a Bob Newhart concert.

Imagine Dragons performed at the facility on March 26, 2013.

Ben Rector performed at the facility on April 5, 2019.

== See also ==
- List of NCAA Division I basketball arenas
