= OKC Oilfield Expo =

The OKC Oilfield Expo was an annual oil and gas industry exhibition focused on providing a venue for industry professionals to network, view new oilfield technologies, compare products and services, and make business deals. The event was held each October at the Cox Convention Center in Oklahoma City, and was the largest energy industry trade fair in Oklahoma. In 2013, the expo featured 335 participating companies across 445 exhibitor booths, and attracted energy industry participants from 25 U.S. states and six countries.
