= North American Youth Congress =

Christian youth event

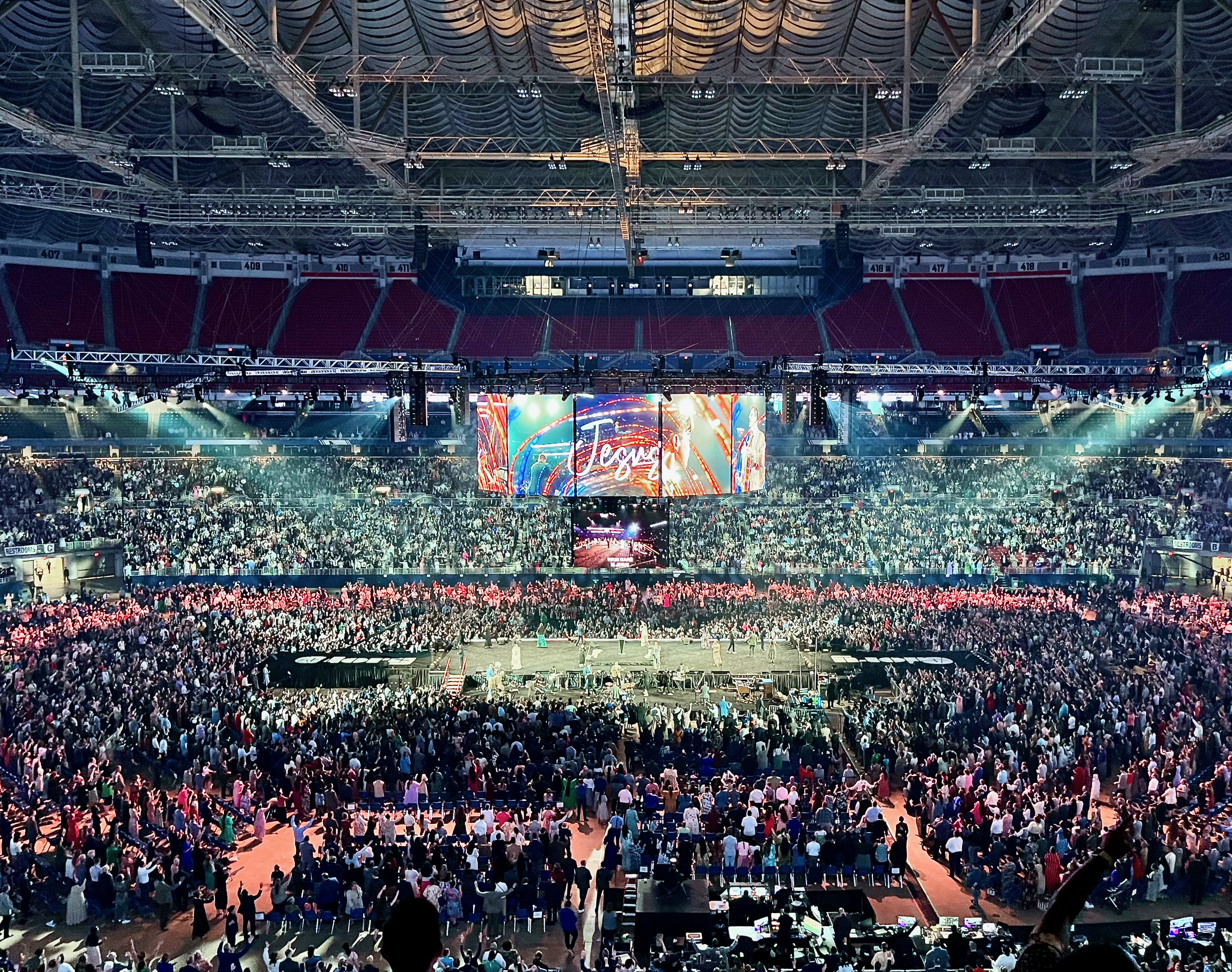
- NAYC 2023 during the Thursday evening service on July 27, 2023, at The Dome at America's Center in St. Louis, MO.
- Nickname: NAYC
- Status: Active
- Genre: Christian conference
- Frequency: Biennial
- Venue: Football stadiums
- Locations: Various, United States
- Established: 1979; 47 years ago
- Most recent: July 23—25, 2025 (Indianapolis, IN)
- Next event: July 28—30, 2027 (Indianapolis, IN)
- Participants: Youth and young adults
- Attendance: 33,741 (2023)
- Leader: D.J. Hill (Youth Ministries President), David K. Bernard (UPCI General Superintendent)
- Organizer: United Pentecostal Church International
- Sponsor: UPCI Youth Ministries
- Website: northamericanyouthcongress.com

North American Youth Congress (commonly abbreviated NAYC) is a biennial event held by the Youth Ministries division of the United Pentecostal Church International, occurring every other year since 1979. The event has been described as one of the largest gatherings of Christian youth in the U.S. and is held in different cities around the country each year. In 2019, there was a record attendance of over 36,000 youth and young adults.

== Overview ==
Being the largest event hosted by the United Pentecostal Church International, NAYC is considered the "premier youth conference" of the UPCI. It is intended mainly for youth and young adults, aimed at people ages 12 to 25. The event features various breakout sessions, nightly services, and a talent search, and students have the opportunity to participate in networking, fellowship, and community service over the course of three days.

=== SERVE Day ===
During NAYC, attendees may also participate in a program known as SERVE Day (formerly Project 22:39) where students help serve the nearby communities. SERVE is held as a collaboration between UPCI Youth Ministries and Reach Out America, the disaster relief arm of the United Pentecostal Church International. SERVE draws inspiration from Matthew 22:39, where Jesus says, “You shall love your neighbor as yourself.”

== History ==
NAYC was launched in 1979 and has traveled to various cities around the U.S. every year, starting in Memphis, TN, and the most recent being in Indianapolis, Indiana. The event has grown over recent years, being described by multiple outlets as one of the largest Christian youth events in North America.

Locations
Year	Location
1979	Memphis, TN
1981	Shreveport, LA
1983	Indianapolis, IN
1985	Tulsa, OK
1987	Cincinnati, OH
1989	Memphis, TN
1991	Kansas City, MO
1993	Indianapolis, IN
1995	Little Rock, AR
1997	Nashville, TN
1999	Indianapolis, IN
2001	Atlanta, GA
2003	Nashville, TN
2005	Columbus, OH
2007	Charlotte, NC
2009	Nashville, TN
2011	Columbus, OH
2013	Louisville, KY
2015	Oklahoma City, OK
2017	Indianapolis, IN
2019	St. Louis, MO
2021	Online (COVID-19)
2023	St. Louis, MO
2025	Indianapolis, IN
2027	Indianapolis, IN
2029	San Antonio, TX

=== 2013 ===
NAYC 2013 was held at the KFC Yum! Center in Louisville, KY, from August 7 to August 9, 2013, with a theme of "Gravity." Registration was at 12,000 for the event. The event's Project 22:39 involved landscaping, painting, and general cleanup of nearby neighborhoods, as well as a food drive to support the Dare to Care Food Bank. Over 500 people signed up to participate, and the Project 22:39 attendees were also greeted by the mayor of Louisville, Greg Fischer.

=== 2015 ===
In 2015, NAYC was held at Chesapeake Energy Arena in Oklahoma City, OK, under the theme "Anthem" from August 5 to August 7. In the first 14 hours of registration, the event sold out with 18,000 registrants, becoming the first to be sold out in NAYC history. To accommodate additional students, overflow seating was provided in the neighboring Cox Convention Center with a live stream of the service from across the street. Final event attendance was over 22,000 young people, and the event brought an estimated $6 million in sales to the city.

=== 2017 ===
Avatar of UPCI Youth Ministries

UPCI Youth Ministries
(@UPCIYouthMin)
tweeted:

NAYC 2017 announces the need for the first time of a football stadium - Lucas Oil Stadium - Indianapolis, IN!! #NSYC15 #NAYC17

7 August 2015

NAYC 2017 was held at Lucas Oil Stadium in Indianapolis, IN, with a theme of “This is That" from July 26 to July 28. This was the first year that NAYC had been held in a football stadium, and the event was attended by over 34,000 youth and young adults. During the Friday evening service, a letter to the attendees from the vice president of the United States, Mike Pence, was read by Youth President Michael Ensey. The event also featured "The Great Pitch," a competition offering young entrepreneurs aged 12–35 over $100,000 in prizes, investment, and coaching for ventures focused on creating meaningful social impact.

=== 2019 ===
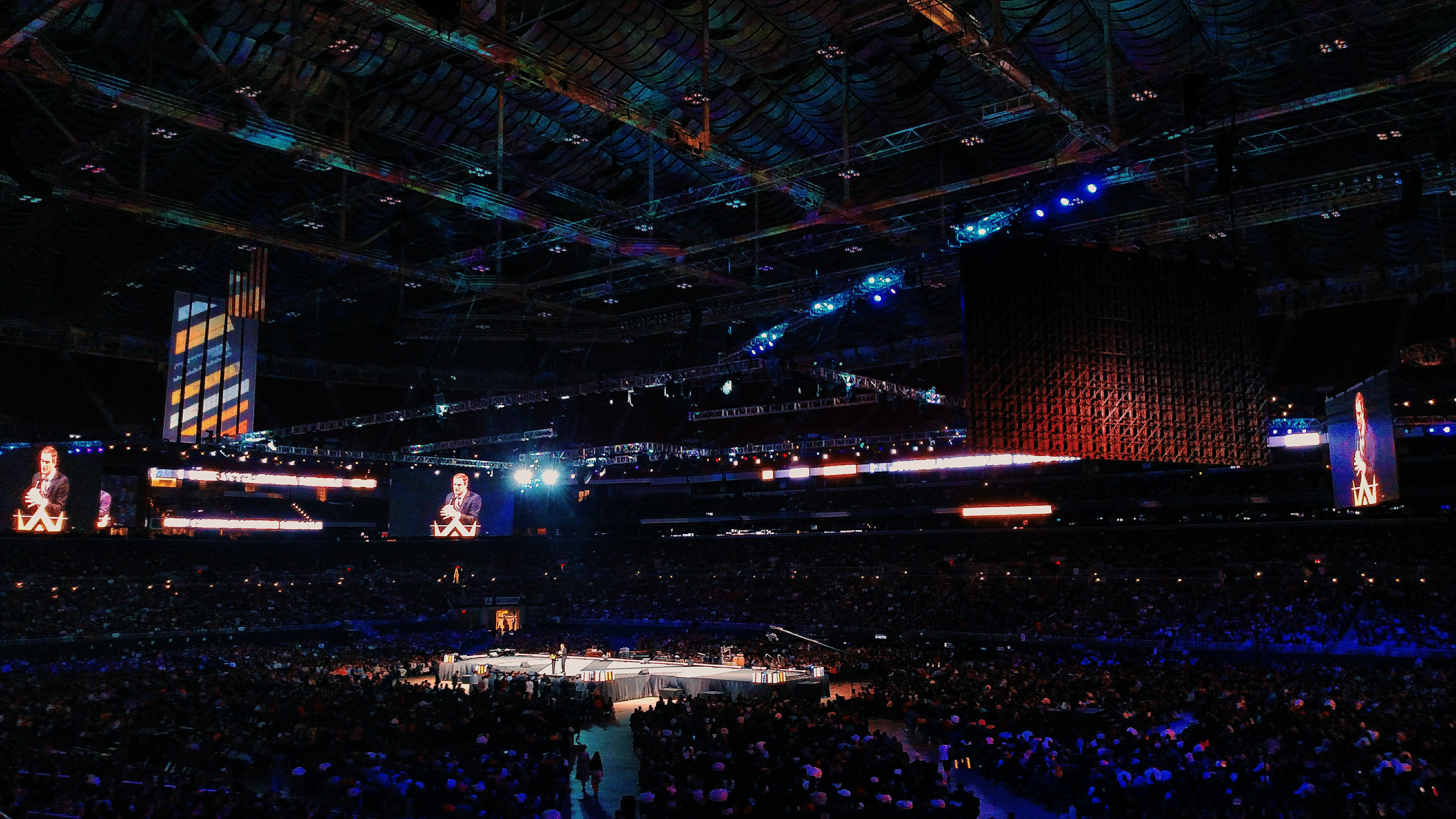
NAYC during the Friday evening service on August 2, 2019.

NAYC in 2019 was held at the Dome at America's Center and America's Center in St. Louis, MO, from July 31 to August 3, under the theme, "Kingdom Come." NAYC 2019 was the largest NAYC to date with around 37,000 young people attending. During the event's SERVE Day, attendees filled 2,000 buckets worth $75 each to assist with disaster relief in the area, with buckets and supplies provided by Lowe's and Feed the Children.

=== 2021 ===
In 2021, NAYC, with the theme of "Ascend," was once again scheduled to be held at Lucas Oil Stadium in Indianapolis, IN, from July 28 to July 30. However, due to the COVID-19 pandemic, it was canceled as an in-person event on March 29, 2021, instead being rescheduled as a single live streamed event on July 30, 2021, promoted using the hashtag #ScatteredToGather. As of January 2025, the live stream of the online event has gained over 28,000 views on YouTube and 80,000 views on Facebook.

=== 2023 ===
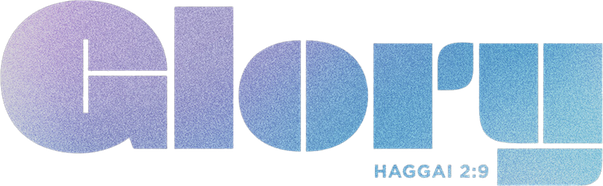
The logo of NAYC 2023, referencing Haggai 2:9.

NAYC 2023, under the theme of "Glory," was held in St. Louis, MO, at The Dome at America's Center with split sessions at the St. Louis Convention Center from July 26 to July 28. In a statement, the UPCI announced that over 30,000 people had registered for the event since March 10, with the final registration being placed at 33,000. Final event attendance was 33,741 attendees. NAYC 2023's SERVE Day involved over 1,500 students preparing 3,000 disaster relief buckets containing items such as toothbrushes, toothpaste, soap, and other hygiene products and cleaning supplies.

=== 2025 ===
NAYC 2025 was held at Lucas Oil Stadium with split sessions at the Indiana Convention Center in Indianapolis, IN, from July 23 to July 25, 2025, with a theme of "CALLED", referencing Mark 3:14-15.

== See also ==
- United Pentecostal Church International
- Oneness Pentecostalism
