= The Dome at America's Center =

Stadium in St. Louis, Missouri, U.S.

- The Dome; The BattleDome

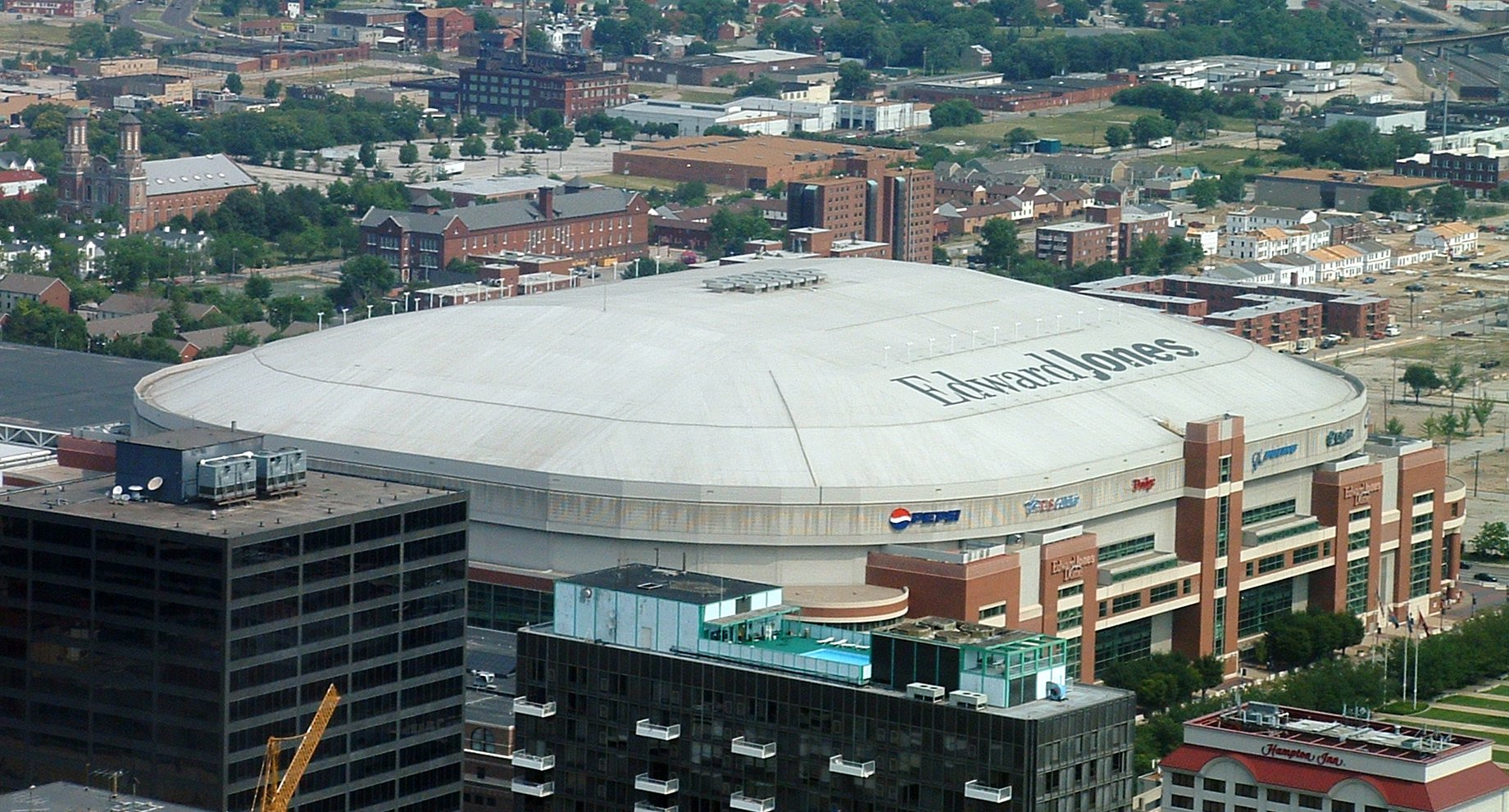
- The Dome in 2006
- Interactive map of The Dome at America's Center
- Former names: Trans World Dome (1995–2001); Edward Jones Dome (2002–2016)
- Address: 701 Convention Plaza
- Location: St. Louis, Missouri, United States
- Coordinates: 38°37′58″N 90°11′19″W
- Owner: St. Louis Regional Sports Authority
- Operator: St. Louis Convention/Visitors Bureau
- Capacity: Full stadium: 67,277 (such as for American football games); Half stadium: 40,000 (such as for basketball games)
- Executive suites: 120
- Surface: AstroTurf RootZone 3D3 Series (2025-present) AstroTurf GameDay Grass 3D (2010–2024); FieldTurf (2005–2010); AstroTurf (1995–2004)
- Record attendance: 75,000 (March 9, 2019; Garth Brooks' Stadium Tour)
- Public transit: Red Blue; At Convention Center

Construction
- Groundbreaking: July 13, 1992; 34 years ago
- Opened: November 12, 1995; 31 years ago
- Renovated: 2009, 2010, 2024
- Cost: US$280 million ($592 million in 2025 dollars)
- Architects: HOK Sport (now Populous); Kennedy Associates/Architects, Inc.
- Project manager: J.S. Alberici Construction
- Structural engineer: EDM Incorporated
- Services engineer: Design Consulting Engineering Inc.
- General contractor: M.A. Mortenson Company

Tenants
- St. Louis Rams (NFL) 1995–2015; St. Louis Battlehawks (UFL) 2020, 2023–present

Website
- Venue Website

The Dome at America's Center is a multi-purpose stadium used for concerts, major conventions, and sporting events in downtown St. Louis, Missouri, United States. Previously known as the Trans World Dome from 1995 to 2001 and the Edward Jones Dome from 2002 to 2016, it was constructed largely to lure a National Football League (NFL) team to St. Louis and to serve as a convention space.

The Dome received its initial main tenant with the arrival of the NFL's St. Louis Rams, who relocated to the city in 1995. The Rams spent the next 21 seasons at the Dome, departing after the 2015 NFL season to return to Los Angeles. The St. Louis Battlehawks of the United Football League began playing at the stadium in early 2020, with Battlehawk fans commonly referring to the dome as the BattleDome.

The Dome provides multiple stadium configurations that can seat up to 82,624 people. Seating levels include a private luxury suite level with 120 suites, a private club seat and luxury suite level with 6,400 club seats, a concourse level (lower bowl) with 28,352 seats, and a terrace level (upper bowl) with 29,400.

The Dome is part of the America's Center convention center. The convention portion has a much bigger footprint and adjoins to the west of the Dome, Cole Street to the north, Broadway to the east, and Convention Plaza to the south. The stadium is serviced by the Convention Center MetroLink rail station.

== Architecture ==
The stadium's exterior facade is clad in brick, limestone, and precast concrete tinted to resemble red sandstone. The intended effect was for the venue to less resemble a stadium, and more resemble the look of public libraries and city school buildings built in the era preceding World War II.

== History ==
In 1988, the football Cardinals left St. Louis for Phoenix, Arizona, leaving eastern Missouri without a National Football League team. Looking to re-enter the league, St. Louis proposed building a domed stadium for a team to play in and attaching the Dome to the convention center to expand convention center capacity. The funding for the project was accomplished via public bonds beginning in 1989. In 1991, St. Louis put in for an NFL expansion franchise for 1995 called the St. Louis Stallions and began construction on The Dome in 1992. However, in 1993, the league chose Charlotte, North Carolina, and Jacksonville, Florida, over St. Louis.

After St. Louis came up short in its expansion bid, it appeared that the city might land a new team anyway. Advertising executive James Orthwein, a St. Louis native and member of the Busch family, bought the New England Patriots in 1992 from Victor Kiam to resolve a debt between the two men. The Patriots had long been in financial malaise since original owner Billy Sullivan, who was still the team president during Kiam's ownership, had squandered all of his net worth on a series of bad investments in the mid-1980s and was forced to sell the team to Kiam and Foxboro Stadium to Robert Kraft. Immediately upon purchase, Orthwein made it clear that he wanted to relocate the team from Foxborough, Massachusetts to St. Louis and was to leave New England at the end of the 1993 season. Orthwein's plans to move the team however were thwarted when Kraft refused to let Orthwein out of the long-term lease that he had secured from Kiam and Sullivan as part of his purchase of the stadium. Orthwein did not want to own the team if he could not move it, and Kraft initiated what amounted to a hostile takeover by making his own offer for the team. While Kraft was outbid by future Rams owner Stan Kroenke, Orthwein would have had to bear all relocation and legal expenses. With Kraft making it clear he would take the Patriots to court in order to enforce the lease, Orthwein sold the team to Kraft in 1994.

The then under-construction Dome finally received the NFL tenant it was looking for in 1995 when Georgia Frontiere announced she would relocate the Los Angeles Rams to St. Louis for the 1995 season. This move was initially voted down, with 21 opposed, three in favor (the Rams, Cincinnati Bengals and Tampa Bay Buccaneers), and six abstaining. The other owners (led by Buffalo's Ralph Wilson, the Jets' Leon Hess, the Giants' Wellington Mara, Washington's Jack Kent Cooke, Arizona's Bill Bidwill and Minnesota's John Skoglund) believed that the Rams' financial problems were caused by Frontiere's mismanagement. When Frontiere expressed a possible lawsuit against the league, commissioner Paul Tagliabue acquiesced to Frontiere's demands. As part of the relocation deal, the city of St. Louis guaranteed that the stadium's amenities would be maintained in the top 25% of all NFL stadiums. After playing their first four home games of the 1995 season at Busch Memorial Stadium because the Dome was not ready, the Rams' first game in the stadium on Sunday, November 12, 1995, was a 28–17 win over the Carolina Panthers.

=== Renovations ===
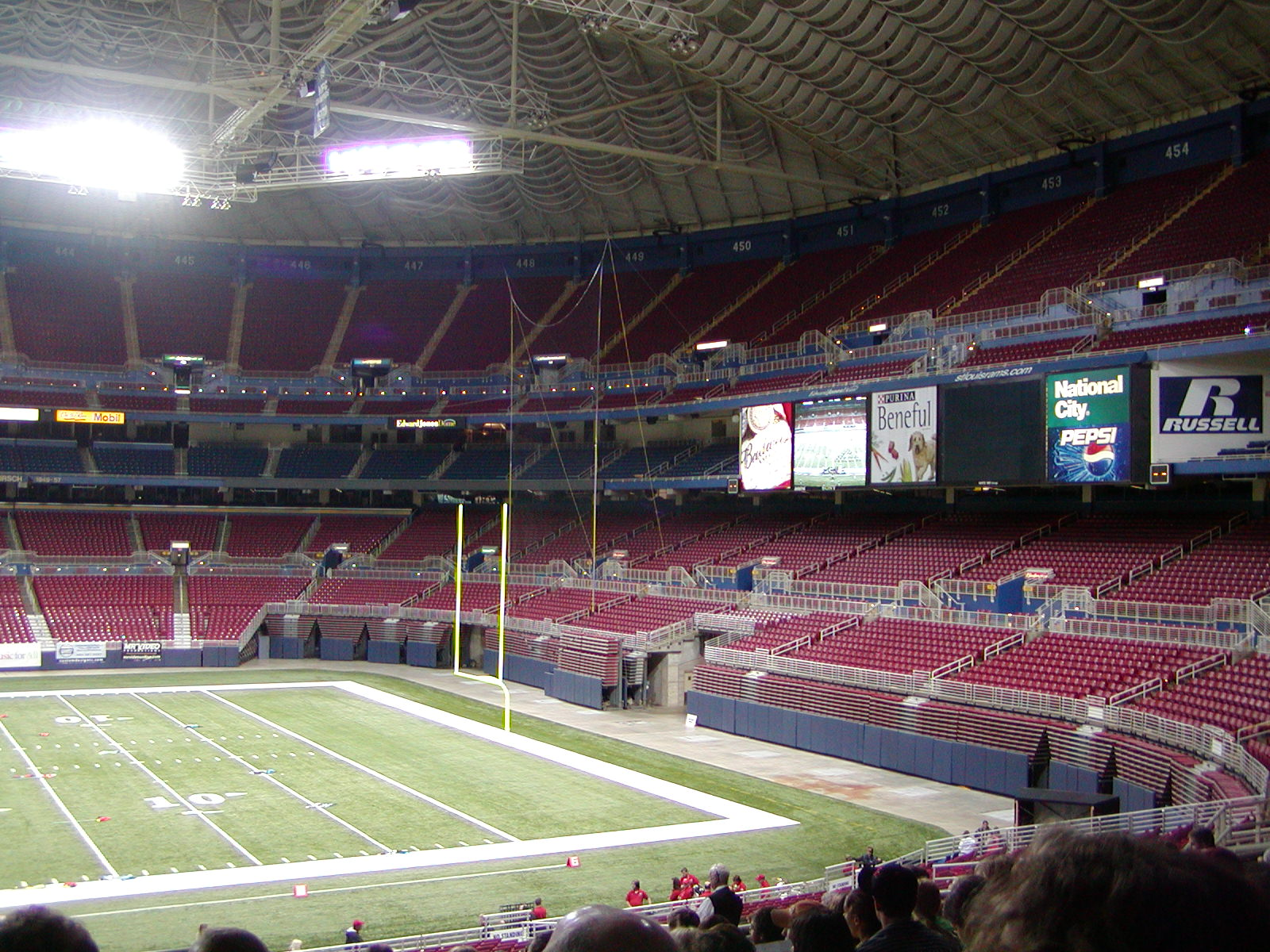
Interior view prior to 2010 renovations

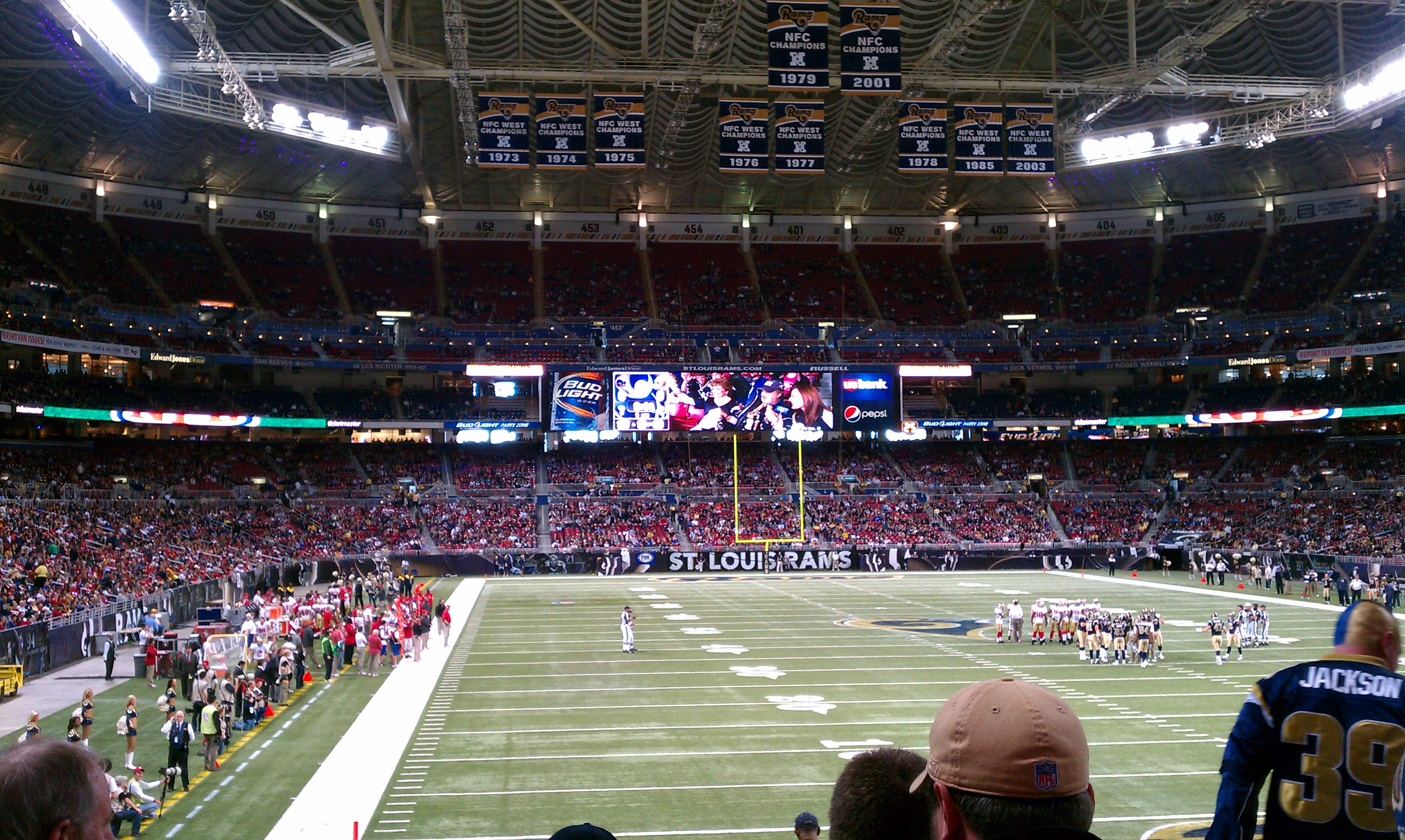
Interior view after 2010 renovations shown during a game

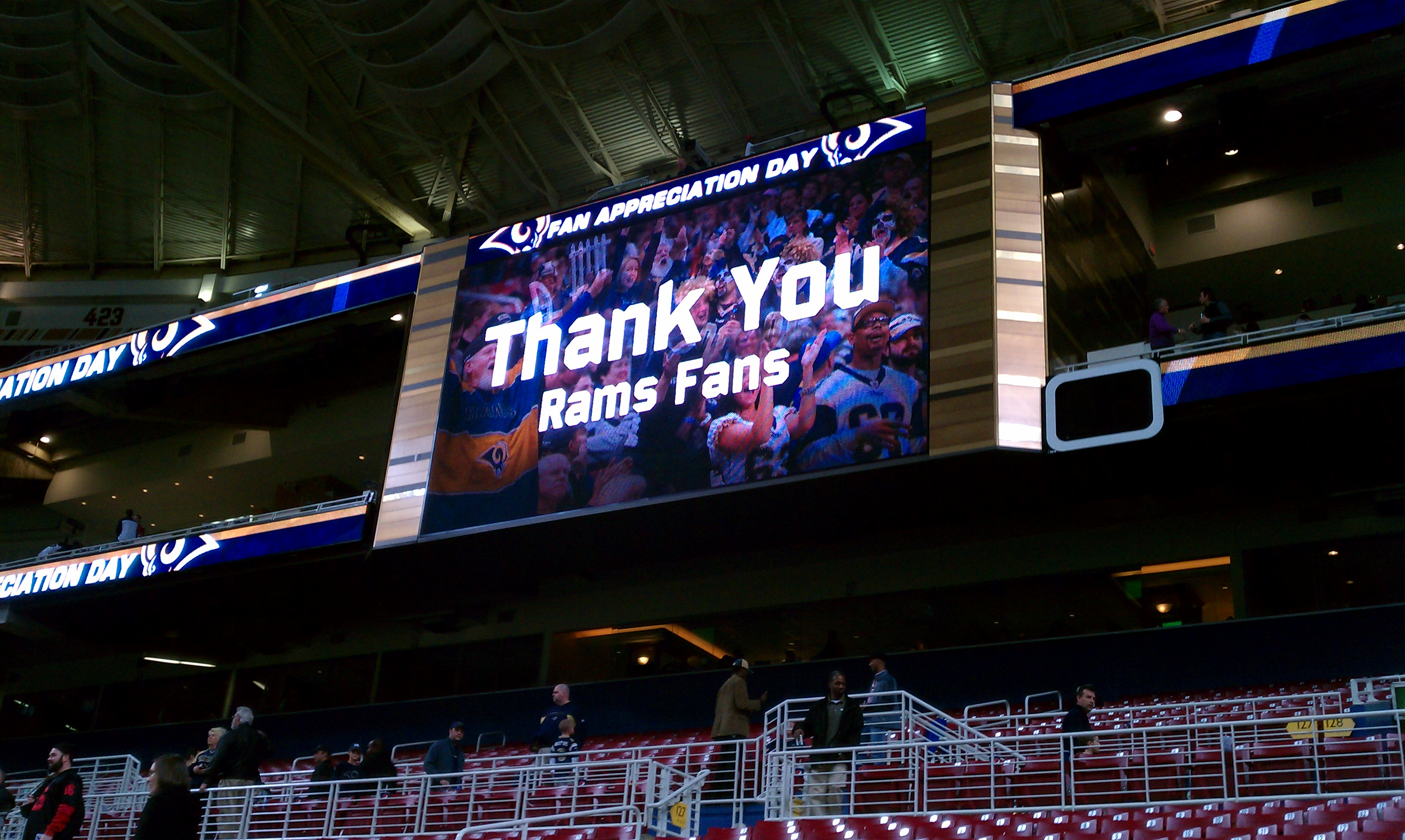
Interior view after 2010 renovations

The Dome received a $30 million renovation in 2009, which replaced the scoreboards with LED video displays (one large in north end zone and one smaller in south end zone) and LED fascia boards around the bowl of the Dome. The renovations also added new premium areas (Bud Light Zone and Clarkson Jewelers Club). Some of the paint work in the Dome was lightened as well and painted in Rams colors (Blue, Gold, and White). In 2010, the Rams locker room was re-built and switched ends from the north end zone to the south end zone. For 2011, new HD monitors were installed throughout the Dome in place of the older screens at concession stands and other areas. Before the 2010 season, the Dome also received a new permanent turf surface. The surface, manufactured by AstroTurf, is AstroTurf's Magic Carpet II Conversion System, which features its GameDay 3D Synthetic Turf System. This system is similar to the original turf system that was in the Dome from 1995 to 2004 whereas it can be rolled up and stored underground in a pit at the Dome. The Dome used a FieldTurf brand surface from 2005 to 2009.

=== The loss of the Rams (2012–2016) ===
The Dome's primary problem throughout the years centered on a lease signed by the Rams when they came to St. Louis in 1995. For the first decade, the Dome was considered an adequate facility, but eventually the Rams and city leaders became concerned with the Dome's long-term viability.

==== The lease and poor rankings ====
Under the terms of the lease that the Rams signed in 1995, the Dome was required to be ranked in the top quartile of NFL stadiums through 2015, measured at 10 year intervals. This meant the Dome had to have the proper fan amenities and other features found in modern NFL stadiums. If the building was not ranked in the top quartile, the Rams were free to break the lease and either relocate without penalty or continue to lease the Dome on a year-to-year basis.

Not helping matters was the Dome's poor reception with NFL fans and the general public as the years went by. Even after the 2010 renovations many websites ranking the 31 NFL stadiums listed the Dome near the bottom of their respective rankings. In 2008, for a Sports Illustrated poll, St. Louis fans ranked it the worst out of any NFL stadium at the time with particularly low marks for tailgating, affordability and atmosphere. Time magazine in May 2012 ranked the Dome as the 7th worst major sports stadium in the United States. The Dome's exterior was regarded as an "urban eyesore from the get-go, an ugly multi-purpose dome that's one defining feature was its inability to fit into any conceivable cityscape...[that] takes up several city blocks but never developed any reasonable interesting business around it: It has always looked like a huge mall from that sad time in recent American history when cities bragged about how big of a mall they could build". Inside, the Dome was "too vast and too cavernous to hold a lot of sound...[and] was the sort of building that felt empty even when it was full", even during the "Greatest Show on Turf" halcyon days of the Rams.

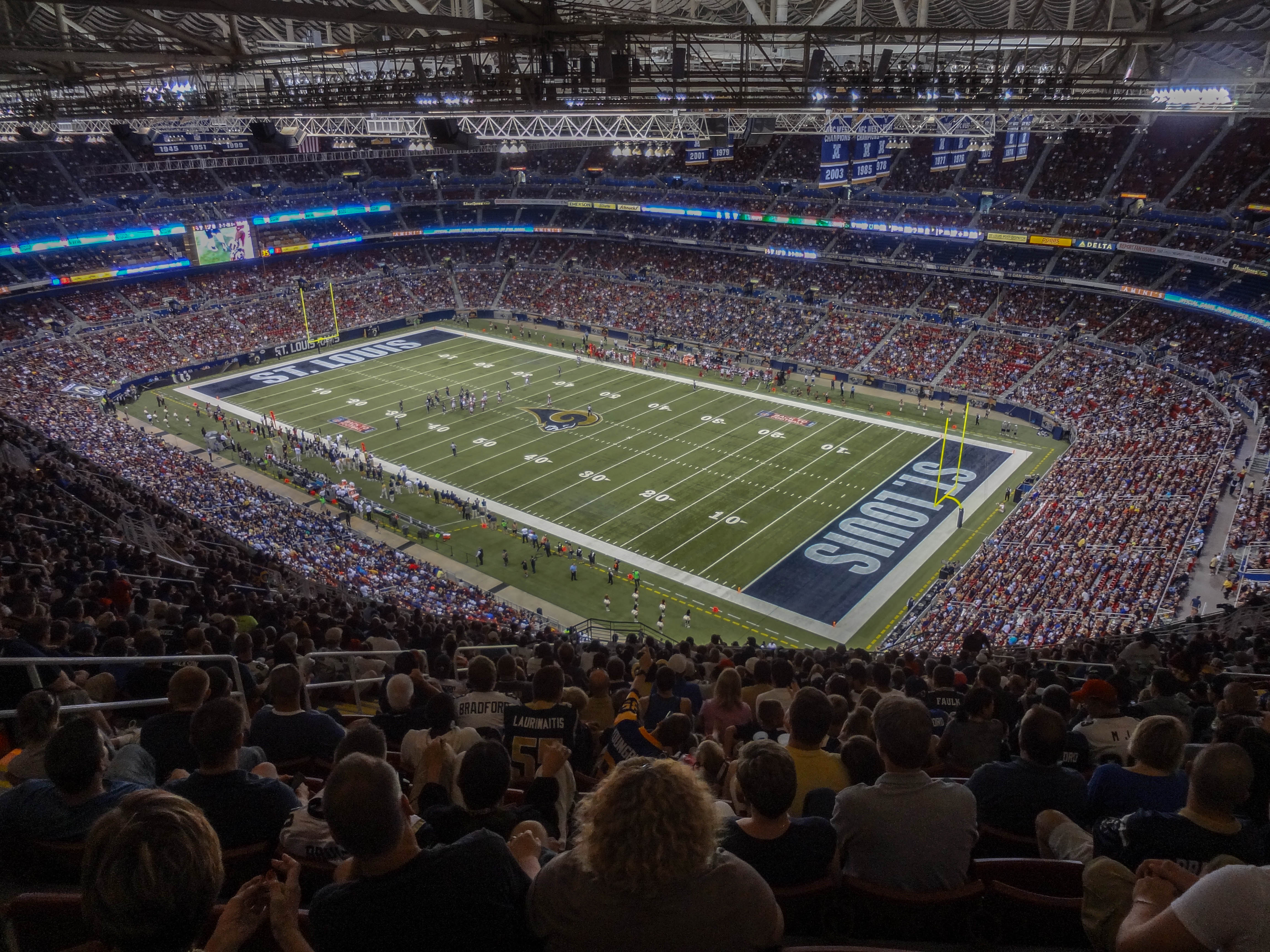
Pictured in 2013

In 2005, the rankings indicated that the Dome was no longer in the top quartile as mandated by the lease, which gave the Rams the right to begin the process of breaking the lease, or reverting to a year-to-year. The Rams, wishing to afford St. Louis ample opportunity to meet the quartile requirement, instead agreed to waive this right for the 2005 checkpoint in return for $30 million of renovations and improvements. However, both the Rams and city leaders realized at this time that long-term, the Dome needed a major overhaul or St. Louis would again risk losing the Rams after 2015. Things were exacerbated further as fan interest began to decline sharply, the mediocrity the team would experience in the waning days of the Greatest Show on Turf contributed heavily to attendance records hitting a new low for the franchise. The Rams placed in the bottom 5 in attendance every season from 2008 to 2015. By 2015, rumors of the team relocating contributed to the Rams finishing dead last in attendance.

==== Negotiations ====
With the 2015 deadline looming, the Convention and Visitor Center (the stadium's operator) and the Rams negotiated throughout 2012 on the renovations and agreed to go into arbitration in 2013 if a deal was not worked out in which three arbitrators mutually agreed on from the American Arbitration Association to arbitrate the case in 2013.

In January 2012, the CVC proposed $48 million in improvements including a new 947-vehicle garage, all funded publicly, with the Rams keeping the garage game-day revenue. After the Rams rejected the $48 million deal, the CVC next proposed $124 million in renovations including a new three-story structure on Baer Plaza on the east side facing the Mississippi River for a main entrance as well as new suites. This proposal had the Rams picking up $64 million of that project, the CVC citing an approximate percentage of what other NFL teams had chipped in for on similar renovations. The Rams countered with a $700 million proposal that called for much of the stadium to be rebuilt including a sliding roof panel and a new four-sided center scoreboard, the Rams asserting that this would satisfy the "first tier" top quartile requirement relative to the current NFL stadium landscape. No details on how to pay for the renovations were made. The sides did not hammer out an agreement in 2012 and the matter went into arbitration hearings in January 2013. Officials noted that even if the arbitrators decided on implementing a more expensive plan and the CVC was unable to fund it the Rams would still be able to break the lease.

With no agreement between both sides in 2013 there was considerable speculation on the future of both the Rams and the stadium with some suggesting the Rams could return to Los Angeles. Further pressure for St. Louis to resolve the issue was that bonds for construction of the Dome were still being paid and would continue to be paid through 2021. Missouri was paying $12 million/year and the City and County of St. Louis were each paying $6 million/year.

On February 1, 2013, the arbitrators ruled in favor of the Rams' $700 million proposal to tear down half the Dome and replace it as the only way among the options presented to bring the Dome up to first-tier status. Various city and county officials said it was unlikely that public funding would be found for such a project. Officials noted that the Rams were contractually obligated to play in the Dome until March 15, 2015, and there was no "buy out" provision to permit the Rams to move before then. City and county officials said they were considering all options including construction of a new stadium elsewhere in the St. Louis area. Rams officials, meanwhile, indicated their preference to stay in St. Louis.

The St. Louis Regional Convention (the stadium's owner) and Sports Complex Authority hired Goldman Sachs in February 2013 "to keep the Rams in the Dome, or, if that's not possible, to maintain a National Football League team in St. Louis." An attorney for St. Louis noted that Goldman had "financed or advised on the financing of every NFL stadium recently built." In April 2013, it was reported by the Wall Street Journal that the arrangement was being scrutinized by the Securities and Exchange Commission as new Dodd–Frank rules restricted firms from offering financial advice to municipalities where it also underwrites its municipal bond transactions. Eventually the hiring fell through and nothing resulted from it.

On July 2, 2013, the CVC announced that they were rejecting the Rams' renovation proposal. Missouri governor Jay Nixon had been negotiating with owner Stan Kroenke since the decision had been made. The earliest the Rams could have broken the lease on the Dome was following the 2014 season, but they chose not to do so in 2014.

==== Inglewood purchase ====
On January 31, 2014, both the Los Angeles Times and the St. Louis Post-Dispatch reported that Stan Kroenke purchased approximately 60 acres of land adjacent to the Forum in Inglewood, California. Commissioner Roger Goodell represented that Mr. Kroenke informed the league of the purchase. Kroenke subsequently announced plans to build an NFL stadium on the site, in connection with the owners of the adjacent 238-acre (96 ha) Hollywood Park site, Stockbridge Capital Group. This development further fueled rumors that the Rams intended to return its management and football operations to Southern California. The land was initially targeted for a Walmart Supercenter but Walmart could not get the necessary permits to build it. On January 5, 2015, The Los Angeles Times reported that Stan Kroenke and Stockbridge Capital Group were partnering up in developing a new NFL stadium on the Inglewood property owned by Kroenke. The project included a stadium with up to 80,000 seats and a performance venue of up to 6,000 seats while reconfiguring the previously approved Hollywood Park plan for up to 890,000 square feet (83,000 m^{2}) of retail, 780,000 square feet (72,000 m^{2}) of office space, 2,500 new residential units, a 300-room hotel and 25 acres (10 ha) of public parks, playgrounds, open space and pedestrian and bicycle access. The stadium would likely be ready by 2019.

In lieu of this St. Louis countered with a stadium plan on the north riverfront area of downtown, known as National Car Rental Field, with the hope of persuading Kroenke to keep the Rams in the city. However, on February 24, 2015, the Inglewood City Council approved the stadium and the initiative with construction planned to begin in December 2015.

This generated further debate between the NFL, St. Louis, and the Rams as to whether the Rams should be allowed to relocate when a "first tier" stadium plan was in process. The NFL and the Rams countered that the stadium plan was developed outside of the agreed-upon lease and "first tier" remediation and arbitration process, and therefore could not be considered a binding factor in preventing the Rams from relocating. In addition, the NFL and the Rams expressed concerns over the funding and maintenance of the proposed stadium, which they felt shifted too much of the costs of construction and maintenance to the Rams organization. Ultimately, as the Inglewood stadium would be built without taxpayer subsidy, that effectively sealed the fate of the Rams in St. Louis.

=== The Rams leave St. Louis ===
The last Rams game at The Dome was on Thursday, December 17, 2015, which they won, 31–23 over the Tampa Bay Buccaneers. The Rams formally filed their request to leave St. Louis for Los Angeles on January 4, 2016. On January 12, the NFL approved the Rams' request for relocation to Los Angeles for the 2016 NFL season. Once the team left, Missouri taxpayers shouldered the remaining $144 million in debt and maintenance costs on the stadium until the debt was paid off in 2021. In the immediate time period after the Rams left the Dome was mainly used for concerts and events overflow from America's Center, including the September 18, 2018, St. Louis stop for Taylor Swift's Reputation Stadium Tour. The Dome still suffers from several design flaws that make it less and less desirable as a convention center. More recently, the Regional Sports Authority has called for additional upgrades to the Dome, to remain competitive for attracting events. Upgrades in lighting, sound, video boards, and various amenities could cost as much as $300 million. Upgrades like this would continue to bring big concerts and conventions to St. Louis, and potentially allow the city to bid for large sporting events like the NCAA Men's Basketball Final Four and college football bowl games. The renewal of the Illinois–Missouri football rivalry in 2026 could also potentially be held at the Dome. Similar upgrades were made to the Alamodome in San Antonio, which after $50 million in upgrades hosted the 2018 Final Four.

=== Football returns with the BattleHawks ===
On November 27, 2018, sources confirmed plans by the new XFL to place one of their 8 teams in St. Louis, whose five home games would be played in the Dome during the league's inaugural season in 2020. This marked the first time professional football had been played in St. Louis since the loss of the Rams. Officials at the Dome also confirmed they had previously been in talks with the former Alliance of American Football, but had to turn down hosting a team due to scheduling conflicts in spring of 2019 (the AAF ended up shutting down before its season was completed). A busy season for the Dome, including hosting a Boat Show, a Monster Jam event, a Garth Brooks concert, and an AMA Supercross Championship event, meant that the Dome did not have five open weekends to host football games. This left an opening for the XFL to fill, which began play in spring 2020.

On December 5, 2018, at a press conference at MetLife Stadium, Oliver Luck, the then-CEO and Commissioner of the XFL, announced that St. Louis had been awarded a team. The Dome was one of two XFL venues with a roof. Along with the Alamodome, Camping World Stadium, Cashman Field and Lumen Field, it is one of five XFL venues in a downtown city center.

On December 10, 2018, news outlets released the agreement between the league and the St. Louis Convention and Visitors Commission. The XFL pay a $300,000 deposit and $100,000 for every game played in the Dome. The XFL receives 100% of ticket revenue, and the CVC receives 100% of concessions and catering revenue. This contract was signed for three seasons.

The first XFL game at the Dome was held on Sunday, February 23, 2020, when the BattleHawks defeated the New York Guardians by a score of 29–9. Opening Day attendance was the highest in the XFL at 29,554.

At the time, XFL games did not use any seats at the Terrace Level of the Dome, bringing the capacity for games down to about 30,000. Given the high ticket sales, the team considered using the Terrace Level, but with the season truncated by the COVID-19 pandemic, those plans did not come to fruition in 2020.

For the team's home opener the 2023 season, an estimated 35,000 tickets sold for the team's March 11 home opener and both the terrace level and the upper decks of the dome were opened to accommodate the high demand. The game drew an XFL record 38,310 attendance, eclipsing the previous record St. Louis set in 2020 and record of 38,253 set by the San Francisco Demons of the original XFL in 2001.

== Naming rights ==
During its planning and construction, the stadium was called The Dome at America's Center. Trans World Airlines, a St. Louis-based air carrier, purchased naming rights in 1995 and held them until 2001. During this time, the stadium was known as the Trans World Dome. When TWA declared Chapter 11 bankruptcy in the spring of 2001 and was later acquired by American Airlines, the naming rights deal was terminated as American already had its name on two NBA/NHL venues in Dallas and Miami).

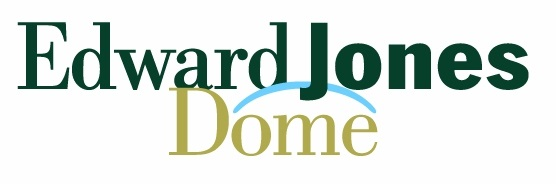
Logo as Edward Jones Dome, 2002–2016

The facility's name then briefly reverted to The Dome at America's Center and remained that way until the naming rights were acquired on January 25, 2002, by Edward Jones Investments, a St. Louis-based financial services firm. Beginning with the NFC Championship Game played two days later, the stadium was now dubbed the Edward Jones Dome, a name it would retain for the remainder of the Rams' franchise's presence in St. Louis.

As part of a deal to sell the naming rights to Rams Park (dubbed at the time the Russell Athletic Training Center), the Rams' training facility in Earth City, Missouri, to sportswear manufacturer Russell Athletic, the Rams agreed to rename the Edward Jones Dome to Russell Athletic Field for the Rams' Monday Night Football game against the Chicago Bears on December 11, 2006. The renaming was for the one night only.

After the St. Louis Rams relocated to Los Angeles in 2016, Edward Jones exercised its right to terminate its sponsorship, and the facility was once again known as The Dome at America's Center.

== Notable events ==
=== NFL playoff football ===
The Dome hosted five NFL playoff games, including the 1999 and 2001 NFC Championship Games, both of which the Rams won. The Rams' only playoff loss at the dome came in 2003, when they were defeated 29–23 in double overtime by the Carolina Panthers in what would ultimately be the Dome's final NFL playoff game. The city's previous NFL franchise, the St. Louis Cardinals, never hosted a playoff game in their history with the city (1960–1987); all of the playoff games they played were on the road.

=== UFL playoff football ===
The Dome hosted the 2024 XFL Conference Championship game between the St. Louis Battlehawks and the San Antonio Brahmas. The Brahmas defeated the Battlehawks 25–15 to advance to the 2024 UFL championship game. Attendance for the game was 30,237.

The Battlehawks hosted the DC Defenders in the 2025 XFL Conference Championship Game, and lost 36-18. Attendance for the game was 27,589.

The Battlehawks hosted the Louisville Kings in the 2026 UFL semifinals, losing 29-20.

=== UFL championship games ===
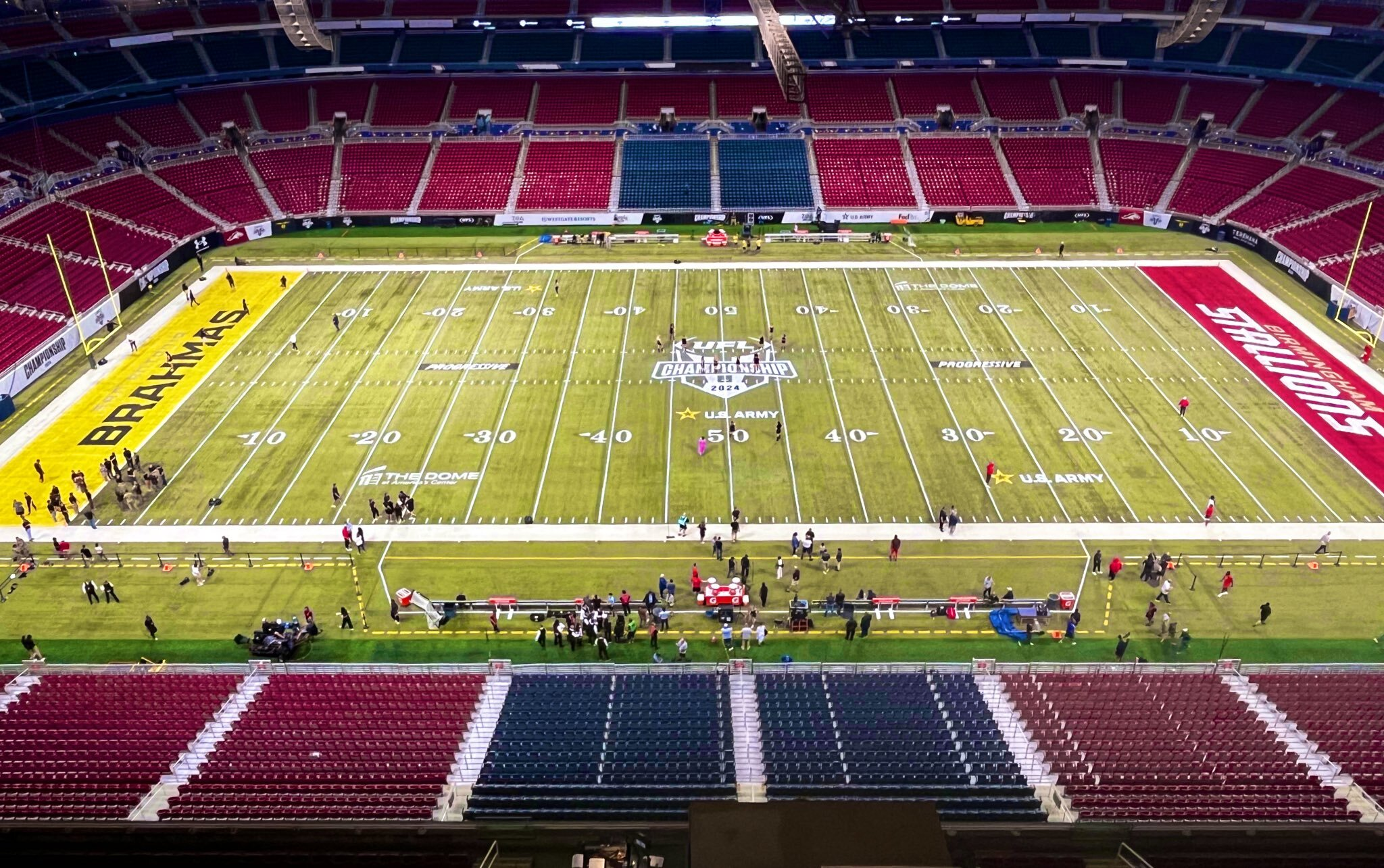
The Dome at America's Center prior to the 2024 UFL Championship Game on June 16, 2024

On March 14, 2024, the UFL announced that The Dome at America’s Center would host the 2024 UFL championship game. UFL President and CEO Russ Brandon stated "Selecting the championship game location is more than just the stadium, but the community and the fanbase that surrounds it. This is why we are proud to bring our Championship to St. Louis – a city that has loved and embraced spring football from the start.” St. Louis Mayor Tishaura O. Jones released a statement saying "St. Louisans are excited to welcome the UFL championship game and tens of thousands of enthusiastic fans to our city, Soon, UFL fans from across the country will learn: Kaw is the law." The Birmingham Stallions defeated the San Antonio Brahmas 25–0 in front of 27,396 fans.

On April 13, 2025, it was announced that the Dome would host the 2025 UFL Championship Game. The game was between the DC Defenders and the Michigan Panthers, which the Defenders won 58–34.

=== Concerts ===
Date	Artist	Opening act(s)	Tour / concert name	Attendance	Revenue	Notes
November 8, 1997	U2	Third Eye Blind	PopMart Tour	24,807 / 50,000	$1,282,160	
December 12, 1997	The Rolling Stones	Kenny Wayne Shepherd; Dave Matthews; Taj Mahal; Joshua Redman	Bridges To Babylon Tour	46,474 / 46,474	$2,538,881	The show was broadcast live on Pay-Per-View and was later released in edited form on VHS/DVD.
April 19, 1998	George Strait	Tim McGraw John Michael Montgomery Faith Hill Lee Ann Womack Lila McCann Asleep at the Wheel	Country Music Festival	—	—	
March 7, 2000	Backstreet Boys	Jungle Brothers; Willa Ford	Into the Millennium Tour	65,201 / 65,201	$2,907,413	
July 2, 2001	*NSYNC	Lil' Romeo	Pop Odyssey Tour	31,790 / 48,808	$1,708,437	
July 25, 2003	Metallica	Limp Bizkit; Linkin Park; Deftones; Mudvayne	Summer Sanitarium Tour	—	—	
August 27, 2014	One Direction	Jamie Scott	Where We Are Tour	52,315 / 52,315	$4,281,608	
September 10, 2016	Beyoncé	Vic Mensa	The Formation World Tour	38,256 / 38,256	$3,953,445	The song "Single Ladies" featured a proposal by a fan.
July 27, 2017	Guns N' Roses	Deftones	Not in This Lifetime... Tour	36,382 / 41,158	$3,533,972	
September 18, 2018	Taylor Swift	Camila Cabello; Charli XCX	Reputation Stadium Tour	47,831 / 47,831	$4,884,054	
March 9, 2019	Garth Brooks	—	The Garth Brooks Stadium Tour	75,000 / 75,000	$6,277,500	
September 26, 2021	The Rolling Stones	The Revatilists	No Filter Tour	38,669 / 38,699	$7,203,265	First public show since the death of drummer Charlie Watts on August 24.
August 21, 2023	Beyoncé		Renaissance World Tour	45,836 / 45,836	$7,064,451	
November 3, 2023	Metallica	Pantera; Mammoth WVH	M72 World Tour	112,286 / 112,286	$12,176,033	
November 5, 2023	Metallica	Five Finger Death Punch; Ice Nine Kills	M72 World Tour	112,286 / 112,286	$12,176,033	
August 10, 2024	Pink	Sheryl Crow; KidCutUp; The Script	P!NK: Summer Carnival			
June 4, 2025	Kendrick Lamar; SZA	Mustard	Grand National Tour	48,600 / 48,600	$8,800,000	
September 5, 2025	Chris Brown	Summer Walker; Bryson Tiller	Breezy Bowl XX Tour	47,014 / 47,014	$7,852,085	
March 7, 2026	Zach Bryan	Caamp; J.R. Carroll	With Heaven on Tour			
July 21, 2026	Usher; Chris Brown		The R&B Tour			
September 8, 2026	AC/DC	The Pretty Reckless Foo Fighters	Power Up Tour			

=== Professional soccer ===
The Dome hosted a soccer friendly match on October 13, 2007, when the United States women's national soccer team (USWNT) played Mexico women's national football team. The United States won 5–1. Attendance for the match was 10,861.

The Dome hosted a soccer match on August 10, 2013, when Real Madrid and Internazionale played a friendly game in front of 54,184 fans, a record attendance for a soccer match in St. Louis.

Date	Winning Team	Result	Losing Team	Tournament	Spectators
October 13, 2007	United States women	5–1	Mexico women	Women's International Friendly	10,861
August 10, 2013	(Spain) Real Madrid	3–0	(Italy) Internazionale	Club Friendly	54,184
May 30, 2014	Bosnia and Herzegovina	2–1	Ivory Coast	Road to Brazil	14,101

=== College basketball ===
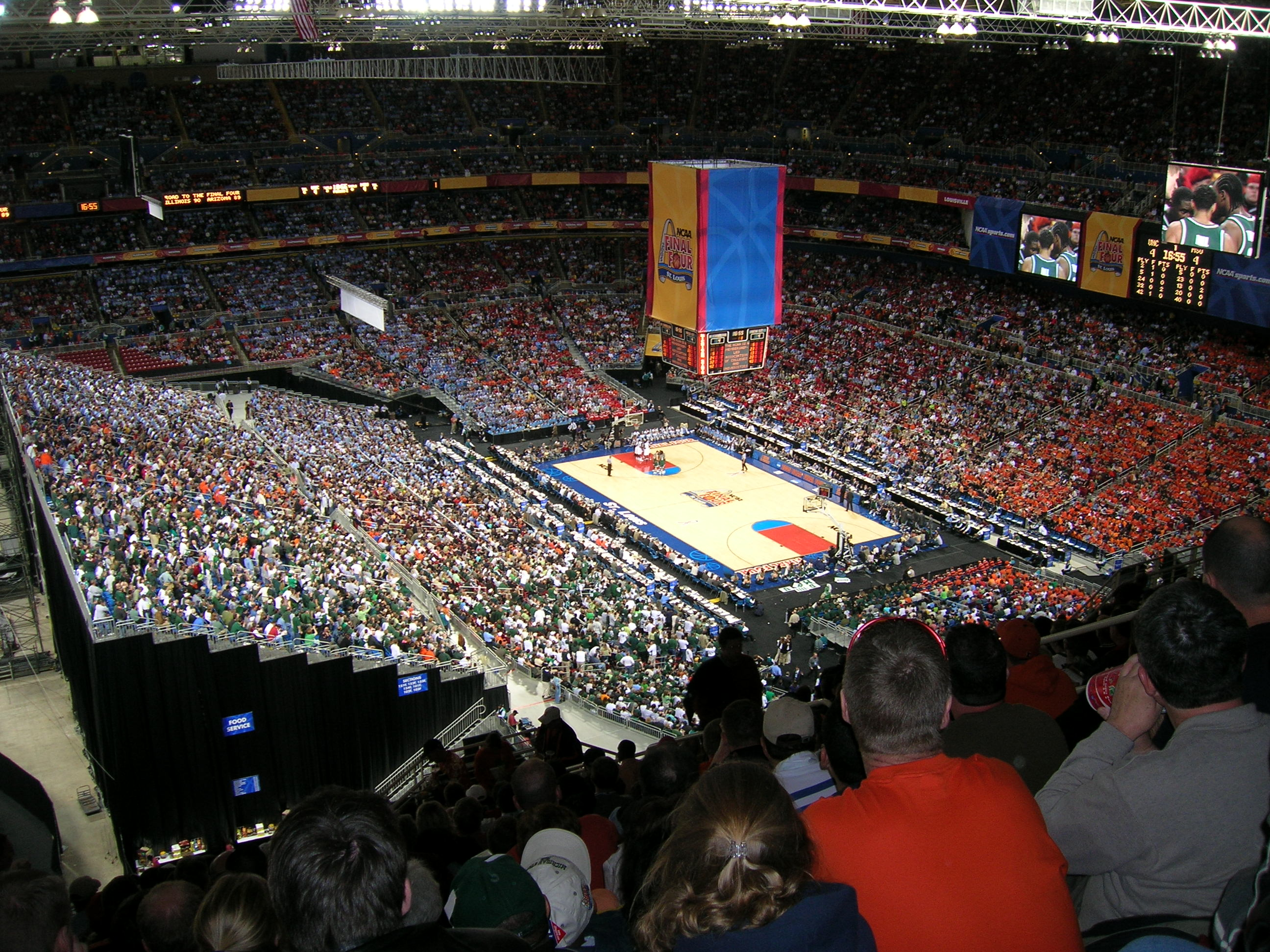
2005 NCAA Basketball National Semifinal, North Carolina vs. Michigan State

In April 2005, the Edward Jones Dome hosted the 2005 NCAA Division I men's basketball tournament Final Four. Louisville, Illinois, Michigan State and North Carolina met, with North Carolina winning the title game against Illinois.

The Dome has hosted an NCAA Men's Basketball Regional four times. In 2004, the St. Louis Regional saw Georgia Tech defeat Kansas in a final that required overtime. Tech had previously defeated Nevada while KU became the first team (and the only one to date) to score 100 points in a college basketball game in the building in its regional semifinal win over UAB. The Dome also hosted the 2007 Midwest Regional, where Florida, en route to winning its second consecutive national championship, defeated Butler and then Oregon, who had defeated UNLV in the other regional semifinal. In 2010, Michigan State eliminated Northern Iowa, and Tennessee knocked off Ohio State, before MSU beat UT to move on to the Final Four. In 2012, North Carolina beat Ohio University and Kansas defeated NC State University. In the regional final, KU defeated UNC to advance to the Final Four.

=== College football ===
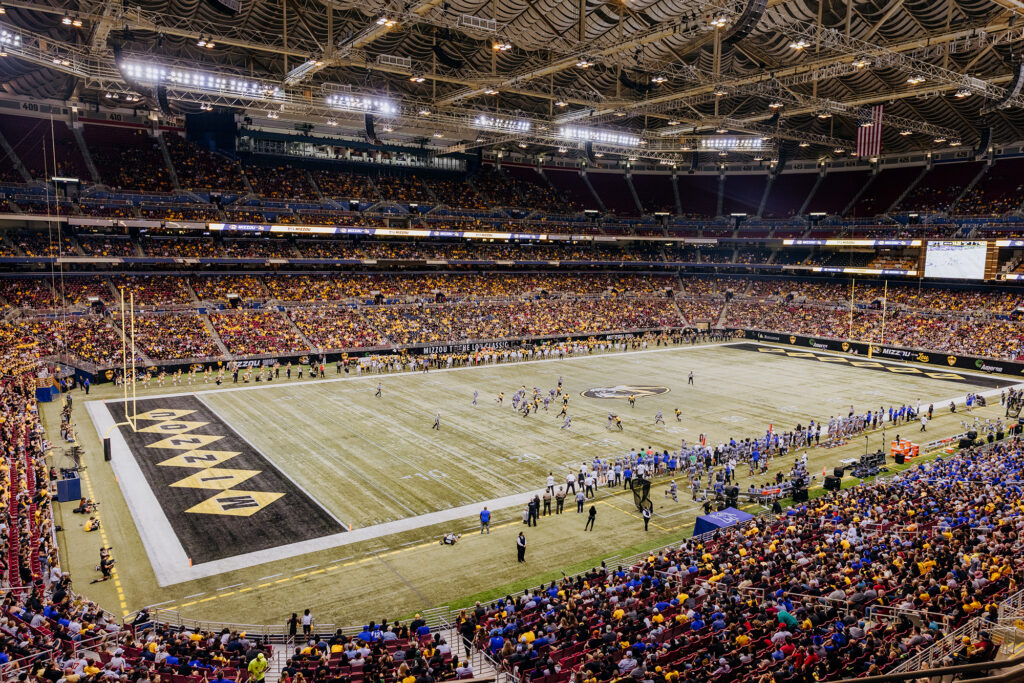
The University of Missouri vs The University of Memphis at The Dome at America's Center. Sep 23, 2023

The Edward Jones Dome hosted the first Big 12 Championship Game in 1996. The third game, in 1998, was also held in the Dome. The Dome has also been a neutral site for regular-season college football match ups between the Illinois Fighting Illini and the Missouri Tigers, promoted locally as the "Arch Rivalry". Missouri has won all six games (2002, 2003, 2007, 2008, 2009 and 2010). On October 3, 2022, the University of Missouri announced a return of Mizzou football to St. Louis. Mizzou undefeated at (3-0) played the Memphis Tigers who were also undefeated at (3-0) on September 23, 2023, in front of a crowd of 45,085. Mizzou won the game with a final score of Missouri 34, Memphis 27. The Tigers had last played in St. Louis in 2010, a 23–13 win over Illinois, the final game of the Arch Rivalry Series, which ran from 2002 to 2010. Mizzou went 6–0 in that series. The game is part of a new partnership with the St. Louis Sports Commission which will host multiple Mizzou athletic events in the St. Louis area during the 2023–24 season – the Mizzou To The Lou Series.

=== MSHSAA Show-Me Bowl ===
The Dome held the annual Missouri State High School Activities Association football championship games from 1996 to 2015. The Show-Me Bowl had previously been contested at Faurot Field in Columbia, Arrowhead Stadium in Kansas City, Robert W. Plaster Stadium in Springfield and Busch Memorial Stadium. MSHSAA had chosen to move to the Dome mostly because it was an indoor facility, as the football championships occurred in December. With the Rams' departure and anticipated end of football at the facility, the MSHSAA voted to return to rotating hosts, with Springfield getting the 2016 championship and Columbia in 2017. As of 2025 all games are played at Spratt Stadium on the campus of Missouri Western State University in St. Joseph, Missouri.

=== Legends of the Dome game ===
On Saturday, July 23, 2016, the Isaac Bruce Foundation hosted a charity flag football game to raise money for the Isaac Bruce Foundation and relive great memories from the Rams' time in St. Louis. Many members of the Greatest Show on Turf including Kurt Warner, Dick Vermeil, Mike Martz, Torry Holt, Ricky Proehl, Az Hakim, Marc Bulger, Orlando Pace, Aeneas Williams, and many others were among the players and coaches involved. At halftime, 2016 Pro Football Hall of Fame and longtime Rams All-Pro left tackle Orlando Pace was honored. Retired Navy Petty Officer Generald Wilson performed the National Anthem. The former "Voice of the Rams" Steve Savard called the game live on 101 ESPN radio in St. Louis. 10,600 fans were on hand for the game.

=== Religious conferences ===
Currently, the building hosts the annual Joyce Meyer Ministries Love Life Women's Conference, attended by 10,000 to 20,000 women each year. Other major conferences include:

- It became the site of the biggest indoor gathering in United States history, on January 27, 1999, when Pope John Paul II held mass in the stadium. Over 104,000 people attended.
- In 1999 the Rev. Billy Graham held the Greater St. Louis Billy Graham Crusade, with well over 200,000 people attending throughout the four days. Michael W. Smith and Kirk Franklin were among the musical artists who performed.
- In 2005, the Dome hosted the General Conference Session of Seventh-day Adventists.
- In 2007, the Nazarene Youth Conference was held at the stadium.
- From 2009 to 2019, the Dome hosted the International Holy Convocation of the Church of God in Christ. The Holy Convocation will return to the Dome in 2026 through at least 2028.
- InterVarsity Christian Fellowship Urbana missions conference, held every three years, was hosted by the Dome from 2006 to 2018. The last one was held from December 27 to 31, 2018.
- The Dome hosted the 80th annual General Conference of the United Pentecostal Church International (UPCI) on September 23 – 26, 2026
- The Dome hosted one of the many 2019 International Convention of Jehovah's Witnesses, having 30,000 in attendance, with the theme of "Love Never Fails" from August 16 to 18, 2019.
- The Dome hosted the Fellowship of Catholic University Students (FOCUS) annual SEEK conference from January 2–6, 2023. The conference had 17,000 in attendance.
- The Dome once again hosted the annual FOCUS SEEK conference from January 1–5, 2024. The conference had nearly 20,000 in attendance.
- The Dome hosted the Mass of Beatification for Fulton J. Sheen on September 24, 2026.

==== NAYC ====
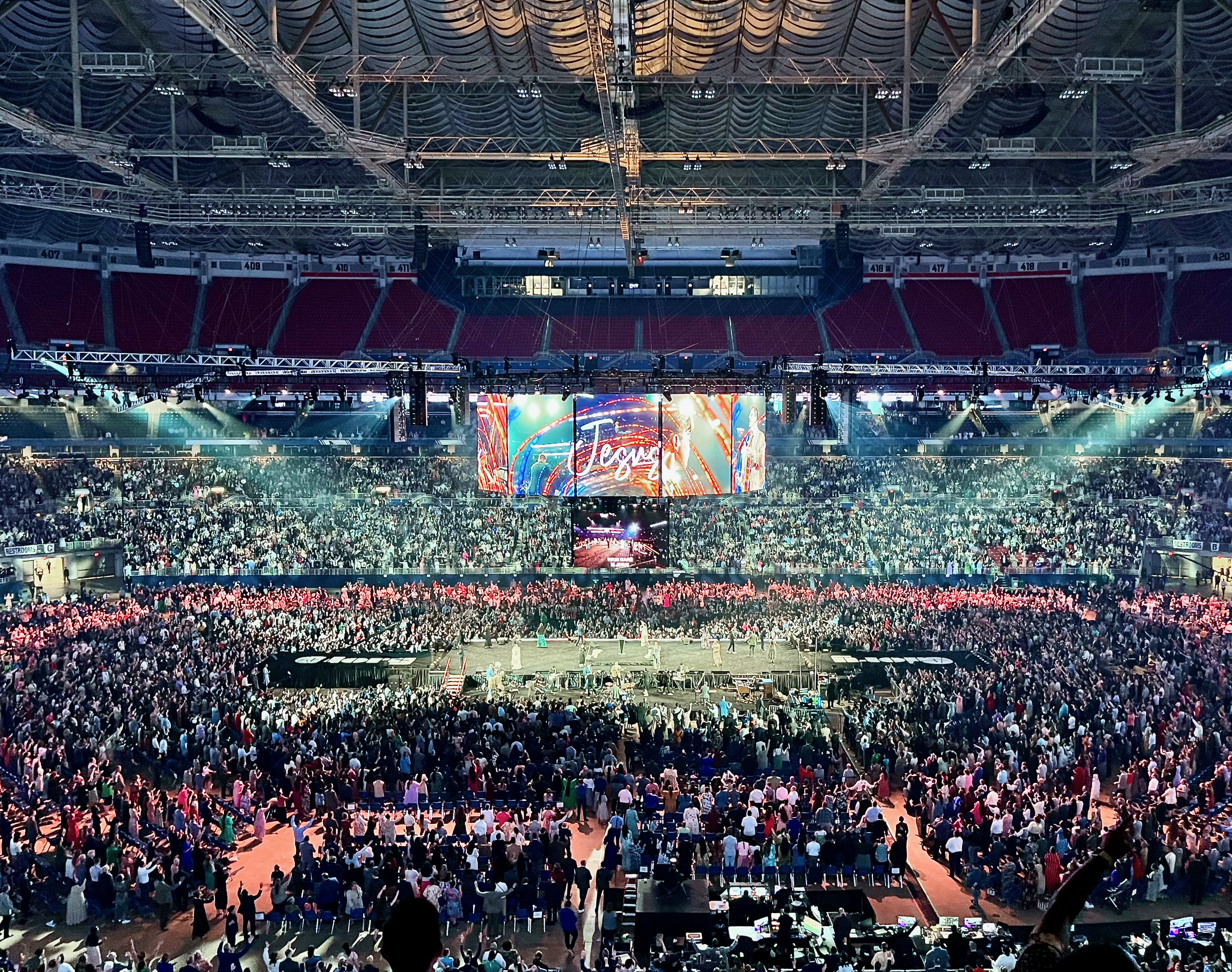
North American Youth Congress 2023 during the Thursday evening service on July 27.

The Dome has twice hosted North American Youth Congress (or NAYC), a biennial gathering of young people via the Youth Ministries division of the United Pentecostal Church International. The first gathering from July 31 to August 2, 2019, was attended by over 36,000 youth and young adults. In 2023, the Dome once again hosted North American Youth Congress from July 26 to 28, with the final attendance being 33,741 attendees.

=== Castrol Gateway Dirt Nationals ===
- The Dome hosted the first ever Gateway Dirt Nationals on December 15–17, 2016, featuring late model and modified events on a 1/5 mile (0.32 km) dirt track, the largest indoor oval track in the United States. Nearly 100 Open Late Models and 130 Open Modifieds entered in the three day event. The race surface, built in four days, was a 1/5th mile banked oval. Late model driver Scott Bloomquist won the main event and $20,000 in front of nearly 15,000 spectators, but not to be outdone by the pass from Shannon Babb on Bloomquist during the Friday night main event with Jason Feger and Darrell Langian running close behind with only two laps remaining. Open Modified driver Tommie Seets Jr. won the main event and $10,000.
- The 2nd Gateway Dirt Nationals took place on December 14–16, 2017, and again featured late model and modifieds. Thursday night, Shannon Babb took the win in the first annual late models "Race of Champions". Friday night, Tanner Mullens won the modified main event, locking himself into Saturday night's main event. In the late models, 17 year-old Hudson O'Neal won the first of two main events. The second late model feature on Friday night saw Gordy Gundaker win. On Saturday night Bobby Pierce picked up the $30,000 check in the late model main event. In the modifieds Ray Bollinger picked up the $10,000 to win A-Main. It was announced that the 3rd Annual Gateway Dirt Nationals would take place November 29 and 30, and December 1, 2018.

=== Other events ===
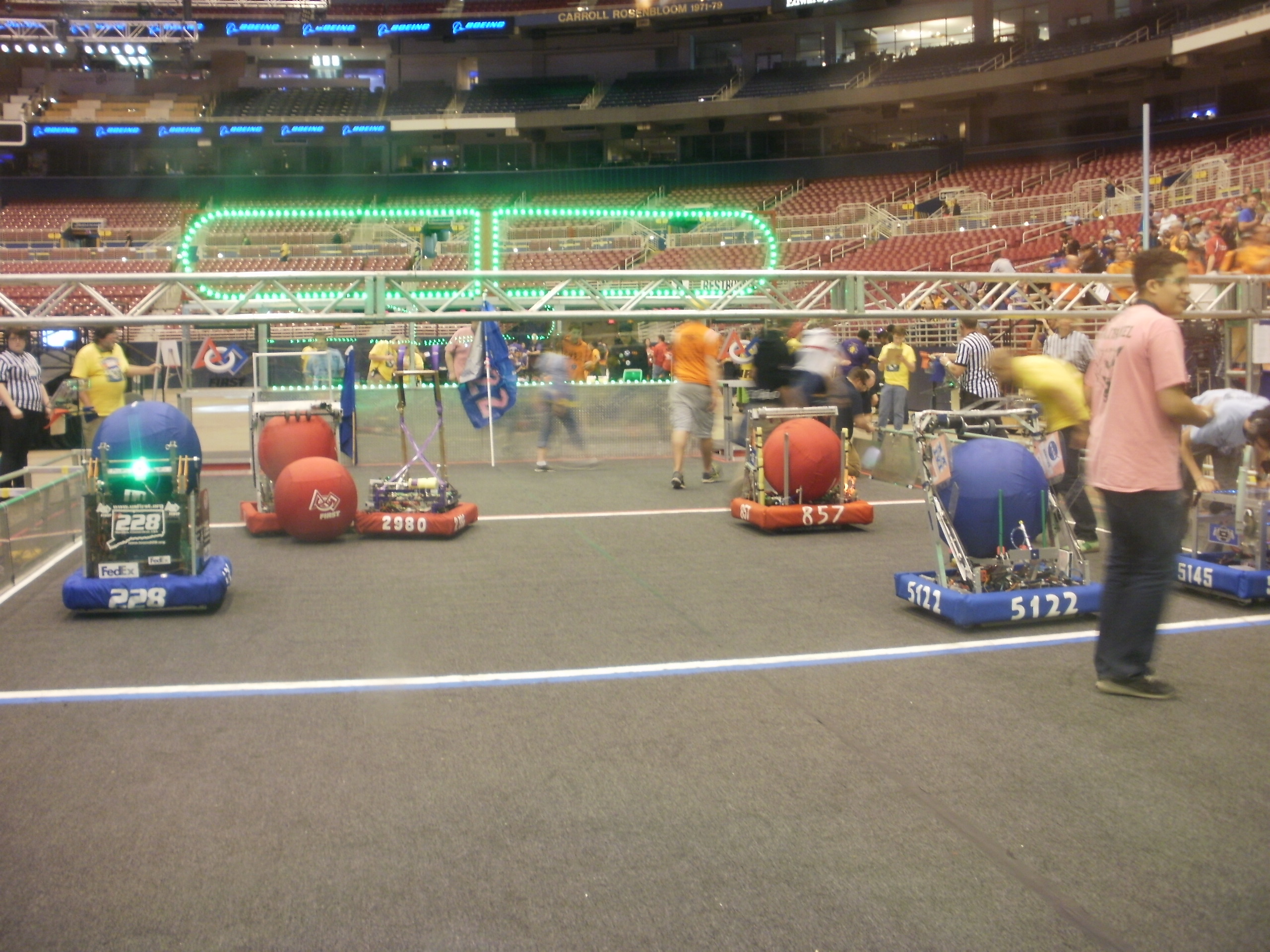
2014 FIRST Robotics Competition game

- From 2011 through 2017, the Dome hosted the World Championship of the FIRST Robotics Competition. 600 teams from around the world qualify annually to compete in the championship held in mid-April. The FIRST LEGO League World Festival and FIRST Tech Challenge Championship occur at the same time, in nearby venues.
- The Dome hosted the Nerium International's Spring Conference in April 2014; and the 35th and 37th Annual Herbalife Extravaganza in July 2015 and 2017 respectively.
- The Music for All Bands of America St. Louis Super-Regional championships has been held annually at the Dome since 1997.
- The Dome hosted an AMA Supercross Championship round since 1996.
- In 1998, the Dome was home to the largest pro wrestling crowd in Missouri state history when WCW broadcast a live Monday Nitro event on TNT. Nearly 30,000 attended live, braving an ice storm to attend. This record would stand until 2022. WCW would return on May 9, 1999, with a pay-per-view event titled "Slamboree", which drew 20,516 fans.
- The Dome hosts Monster Jam events every year.
- In 2013, the Dome hosted a round of the Stadium Super Truck series.
- The Dome hosted Drum Corps International's inaugural 'DCI Midwestern Championship' on July 15, 2018.
- Season 12 of the NBC series American Ninja Warrior was filmed at The Dome, eschewing a traveling format due to the COVID-19 pandemic in the United States.
- The Dome hosted the WWE pay-per-view (PPV) event Royal Rumble on January 29, 2022. This was the first WWE event to be held in the building, and WWE announced a record attendance of 44,390 fans.
- The Dome hosted the VEX Robotics World Championship in 2026.
- The Dome hosted the International Convention and Contests of the Barbershop Harmony Society in July of 2026.

== St. Louis Football Ring of Fame ==
Former Cardinals and Rams football players were included in the St. Louis Ring of Fame in the Dome. During the Rams' time in St. Louis the names were displayed on an overhang surrounding the field. Bold indicates those elected to the Pro Football Hall of Fame.

**St. Louis Rams**
No.	Player	Tenure	Inducted
28	**Marshall Faulk**	1999–2006	2011
78	**Jackie Slater**	1976–1995	2001
**St. Louis Cardinals**
No.	Player	Tenure	Inducted
8	**Larry Wilson**	1960–1972	1999
22	**Roger Wehrli**	1969–1982	2007
72	**Dan Dierdorf**	1971–1983	1999
81	**Jackie Smith**	1963–1977	1999
**Coaches and executives**
	Name	Tenure	Inducted
Head Coach	**Dick Vermeil**	1997–1999	2008
Owner	Georgia Frontiere	1979–2007	2008

Events and tenants
Preceded by Busch Memorial Stadium (Busch II)	Home of the St. Louis Rams; 1995 – 2015	Succeeded by Los Angeles Memorial Coliseum
Preceded by first stadium	Home of the St. Louis BattleHawks; 2020 – present	Succeeded by current
Preceded by Alamodome	NCAA Men's Division I Basketball Tournament; Finals Venue; 2005	Succeeded by RCA Dome
Preceded by Hubert H. Humphrey Metrodome; Giants Stadium	Host of NFC Championship Game; 2000; 2002	Succeeded by Giants Stadium; Veterans Stadium
Preceded by first stadium Alamodome	Home of the Big 12 Championship Game; 1996; 1998	Succeeded by Alamodome; Alamodome
Preceded by Georgia Dome	Host of FIRST Robotics World Championship; 2011–2017	Succeeded by Ford Field & Minute Maid Park
