= Flintco =

American construction company

Coordinates: 36.159933°N 95.989139°W

Flintco, LLC is a United States construction company based in Tulsa, Oklahoma. It specializes in commercial and institutional construction. In 2010, DiversityBusiness.com listed Flintco as the top Native American-owned company. Before 2013, Flintco was owned by a Cherokee Nation of Oklahoma family. In January 2013, Flintco was acquired by Alberici Corporation of St. Louis, Missouri, which said that Flintco would continue to operate on an independent basis.

== History ==
Flintco was founded in 1908 as Tulsa Rig, Reel, and Manufacturing Company (TRR). It served as a supplier of drilling and pumping equipment for the burgeoning oil industry. C.W. Flint became co-owner of TRR in 1919, and sole owner in 1935, expanding operations to include oil field lumber yards and the building of derricks. TRR diversified into building construction, working for the U.S. government building Army bases and air fields. It was between 1949 through 1958 that Flintco undertook its first remodel construction project on the Hillcrest Medical Center campus in Tulsa.

From 1959 to 1998, the company slowly started to expand, providing construction services outside of Oklahoma, into Kansas and Arkansas, eventually establishing offices in Oklahoma City, Memphis, Tenn.; Springdale, Ark.; Albuquerque, N.M.; Austin, Texas; and Sacramento, Calif. During this time, Flintco established a separate division, Oakridge Builders, that focuses on general construction in the Oklahoma and Arkansas area.

In 1994, Flintco was sued by a sub-contractor alleging that Flintco interfered with the sub-contractor's job performance. The trial court found that although the contract lacked a damages for delays clause, Flintco's interference caused damage to the sub-contractor. The case was appealed to the United States Court of Appeals for the Fifth Circuit, which affirmed the award of damages. The case has subsequently been widely published in legal guides for construction companies.

In 2011, Flintco, LLC was named as having the top building contractor safety program in the North American Industrial Classification System (NAICS) 236, 2 million-plus man-hour category at the Associated Builders & Contractors' (ABC) Excellence In Construction Awards. That same year, it also received the Associated General Contractors top award for its safety program.

== Notable projects ==
Flintco has constructed the Oklahoma State Capitol, Memphis Traffic Control Tower, Institute of American Indian Arts, the Texas State Capitol, Oklahoma State University Boone Pickens Stadium, and the University of Oklahoma Gaylord Family Memorial Stadium.
