= Oklahoma Jazz Hall of Fame =

American nonprofit organization

Coordinates: 36°09′24″N 95°59′26″W

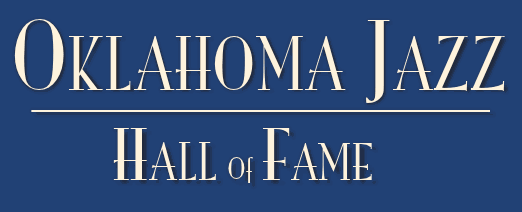
- Founded: 1988
- Founder: Senator Maxine Horner, Co-Founder; Senator Penny Williams, Co-Founder
- Type: 501(c)(3) Nonprofit organization
- Location(s): 5 S Boston; Tulsa, Oklahoma 74103
- Website: okjazz.org

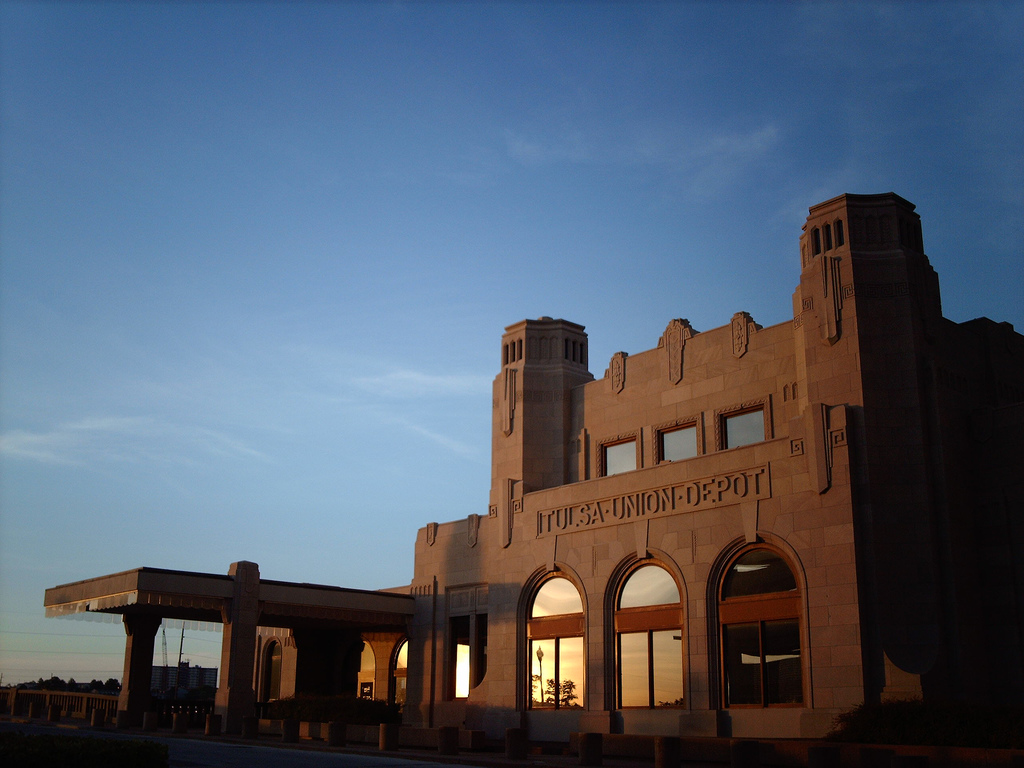
Headquarters of the Hall of Fame, the Tulsa Union Depot.

The Oklahoma Jazz Hall of Fame, located in Tulsa, Oklahoma, is a non-profit organization that honors jazz, blues and gospel musicians in the state of Oklahoma. Housed in the former Tulsa Union Depot, which it now calls the Jazz Depot, the Hall of Fame is a music venue that hosts regular jazz performances. It is also a museum, displaying photographs, biographical information, artifacts, and memorabilia from musicians such as Chet Baker, Earl Bostic, Don Cherry, Charlie Christian, Tommy Crook, Pat Kelley, Barney Kessel and Jimmy Rushing.

== Overview ==
The Oklahoma Jazz Hall of Fame holds an annual induction ceremony to recognize the meaningful contributions of individuals and groups in jazz, blues, and gospel music. The Hall of Fame originally inducted its members every June, but the annual induction is now held in November. To date, the Hall of Fame has inducted more than 100 musicians and groups. Music instructor Zelia N. Breaux was the first inductee into the Hall of Fame.

The Hall of Fame also established the Jay McShann Lifetime Achievement Award in 1999 to honor musicians who enriched Oklahoma's music during their lifetimes. Recipients of this award include Jay McShann, John Hendricks, Lou Donaldson, Dave Brubeck, Marilyn Maye, Ramsey Lewis, Nat King Cole, George Duke, Billy Taylor, Eddie Palmieri, Bob Wills, and Lalo Schifrin.

In 1991, guitarist Barney Kessel made a speech about improvised music at the Hall of Fame; this was his last recorded public appearance before a stroke forced him to retire in May 1992. Singer Joe Lee Wilson also made his last public performance at his 2010 induction into the Hall of Fame.

== History ==
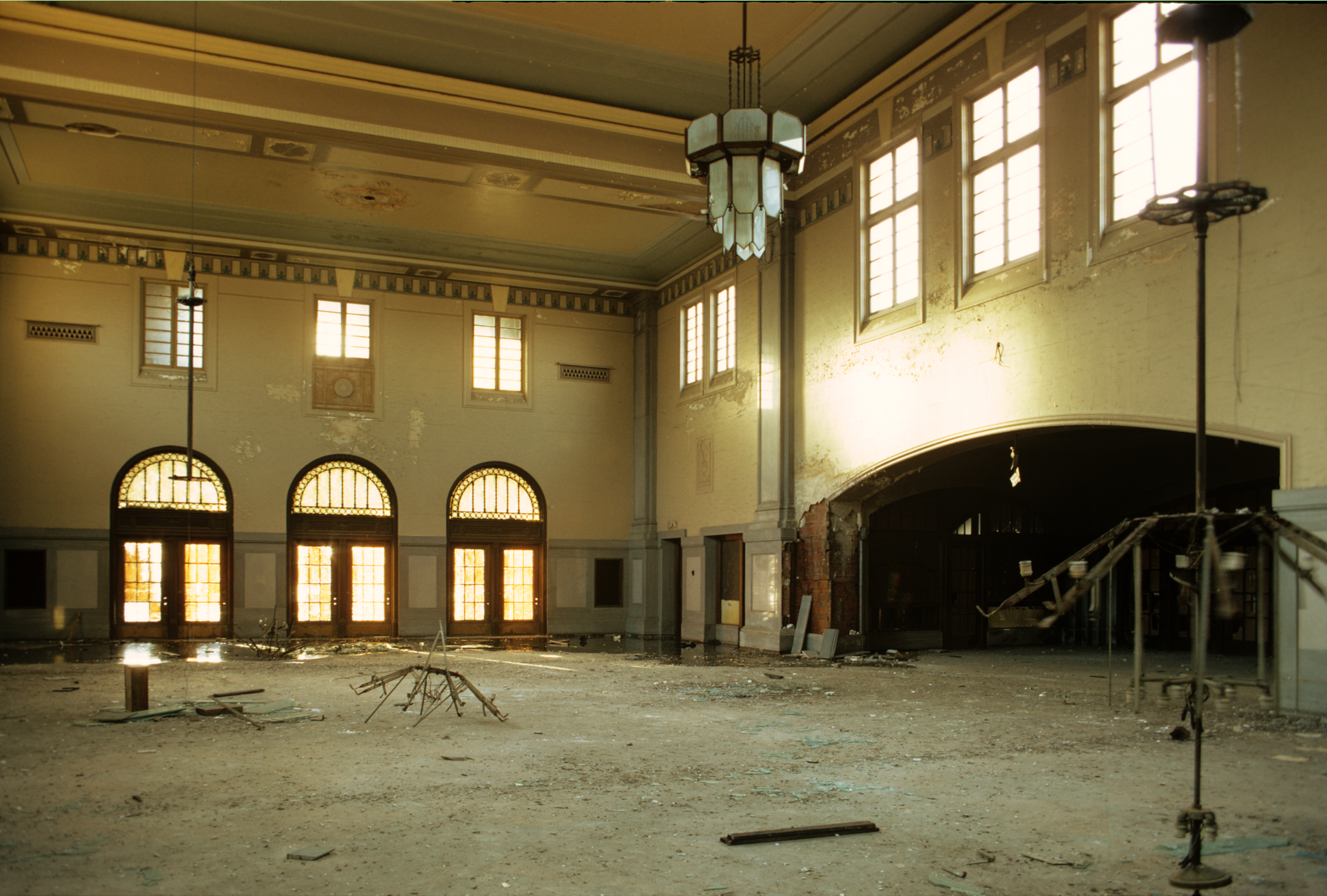
The Tulsa Union Depot remained empty for nearly twenty years before being renovated and re-purposed for public use.

The Oklahoma Jazz Hall of Fame was established by the Oklahoma Legislature in 1988, with legislation authored by State Senators Maxine Horner and Penny Williams. The Hall of Fame was one of several organizations created in the North Tulsa “renaissance” dedicated to reconstructing the city's historic Greenwood district after the Tulsa race massacre. The organization was originally housed in the Greenwood Cultural Center, and co-sponsored a yearly celebration of Oklahoman black music tradition called “Juneteenth on Greenwood.”

In 2004, Tulsa County’s Vision 2025 project allocated $4 million to purchase and renovate the Tulsa Union Depot for use by the Oklahoma Jazz Hall of Fame. Work on the building was completed and the building officially opened on June 19, 2007.

In November, 2020, The Tulsa County Industrial Authority (TCIA) filed a lawsuit to terminate the building lease with the Jazz Hall and to recover $8,474 in past-due taxes and utilities. The suit alleged that the Jazz Hall was so far behind in its utility payments that electricity to the building was turned off on October 19th. In January 2021 the Jazz Hall declared bankruptcy. On June 10, 2021, the bankruptcy court approved a $200,000 sale of the Jazz Hall, along with transfer of the lease of the Depot, to a new non-profit entity, The Jazz Foundation LLC, being a firm established by local businessman James Moore. The bid included a pledge of $1 million for deferred maintenance and other improvements, along with $1 million available for operating expenses and to satisfy future obligations under the lease with TCIA. Stated future Jazz Hall plans call for continued celebration of jazz and gospel artists in Oklahoma, expanding to host music festivals and live TV events, and creating a rooftop restaurant.

By July 2022, renovations had begun on the facility, with an expected reopening in early 2023 under branding as simply the Jazz Depot. The Jazz Foundation funded $2 million in renovation updates for the second-floor Grand Entrance Hall, Exhibit Promenade and Performance Hall. Renovations were continuing in July 2026, and no time frame for reopening had been determined.

== List of inductees ==
| Name | Instrument | Year inducted |
|---|---|---|
| Marvin Ash | Strings | 2013 |
| Andrea Baker | Vocal, Education | 2005 |
| Chet Baker | Trumpet, Vocal | 1991 |
| Helen Baylor | Vocal | 2000 |
| Samuel Aaron Bell | Bass | 1992 |
| Wayne Bennett | Guitar, Vocal | 2001 |
| Joseph Bias | Vocal | 2006 |
| Elvin Bishop | Guitar, Vocal | 1998 |
| Earl Bostic | Saxophone | 1993 |
| Zelia N. Breaux | Education | 1989 |
| David Amram | F Horn | 2011 |
| Ruth Brown | Vocal | 1992 |
| Albert Brumley | Vocal | 2013 |
| Glenn Burleigh | Piano | 2001 |
| Charles Burton | Guitar, Vocal | 2001 |
| Barbara Burton | Vocal | 2001 |
| Don Byas | Saxophone | 1997 |
| J.J. Cale | Guitar | 2013 |
| Debbie Campbell | Vocal | 2006 |
| Don Cherry | Trumpet | 2011 |
| Charlie Christian | Guitar | 1989 |
| Willie Earl Clark | Saxophone, Education | 2002 |
| Tommy Crook | Guitar | 2004 |
| Pam Van Dyke Crosby | Vocal | 2008 |
| Joey Crutcher | Piano | 1991 |
| Jesse Ed Davis | Guitar | 2002 |
| Elmer L. Davis | Vocal | 1993 |
| Rae Degeer | Clarinet, Alto Saxophone | 2014 |
| Al Dennie | Education | 1990 |
| George Dennie | Pianist | 2012 |
| Ernestine Dillard | Vocal | 1998 |
| Clarence Dixon | Vocal | 1998 |
| Thomas A. Dorsey | Piano | 1994 |
| Ken Downing | Saxophone | 1999 |
| Duke Ellington | Piano | 1992 |
| Dorothy Ellis | Vocal | 2011 |
| Ralph Ellison | Musician | 2014 |
| George Faison | Dance | 1998 |
| Ernie Fields Jr. | Saxophone | 1996 |
| Ernie Fields Sr. | Trombone | 1989 |
| Fisk Jubilee Singers | Vocal | 2012 |
| Ella Fitzgerald | Vocal | 1997 |
| Artt Frank | Drums | 2010 |
| Lowell Fulson | Guitar, Vocal | 1989 |
| Chuck Gardner | Piano | 2013 |
| Dizzy Gillespie | Trumpet | 1993 |
| Earl Grant | Piano, Vocal | 2013 |
| Sonny Gray | Piano, Education | 2001 |
| Wardell Gray | Tenor Saxophone | 2014 |
| Jimmy Hawkins | Vocal | 2004 |
| John David Henry | Guitar | 2001 |
| Conrad Herwig | Trombone | 2007 |
| Billy Hunt | Trumpet | 1996 |
| Mahalia Jackson | Vocal | 1995 |
| Pat Kelley | Guitar | 2003 |
| Barney Kessel | Guitar | 1991 |
| Kenneth Kilgore | Vocal | 1992 |
| Joe Liggins | Piano | 1992 |
| Jimmy Liggins | Guitar | 1993 |
| Clarence Love | Saxophone | 1990 |
| Madeline Manning-Mims | Vocal | 2005 |
| Frank Mantooth | Piano | 2004 |
| Junior Markham | Harmonica | 2006 |
| Tony Mathews | Guitar | 1997 |
| Bill Maxwell | Drums | 2008 |
| Cecil McBee | Bass | 1991 |
| Matthew McClarty | Vocal | 1997 |
| Howard McGhee | Trumpet | 2003 |
| Robbie Mack McLerran | Bass | 2014 |
| Jay McShann | Piano | 1989 |
| Roy Milton | Vocal, Drums | 1991 |
| D.C. Minner | Guitar, Vocal | 1999 |
| Leona Mitchell | Vocal | 2007 |
| Melvin Moore | Trumpet | 1996 |
| Patricia Moore | Piano | 1999 |
| Ace Moreland Jr. | Guitar, Harmonica, Vocal | 2007 |
| Sunny Murray | Drums | 2012 |
| Jimmy Nolen | Guitar | 1996 |
| Carlton Pearson | Vocal | 2002 |
| Jim Pepper | Saxophone | 2011 |
| Oscar Pettiford | Bass, Cello | 1995 |
| Sara Jordan Powell | Vocal | 2003 |
| Cortes Rex | Vocal | 2014 |
| Johnny Rogers | Guitar | 1995 |
| Annie Ross | Vocal | 2014 |
| Ray D. Rowe | Vocal | 2008 |
| Marshal Royal | Saxophone | 1995 |
| Washington Rucker | Drums | 1998 |
| James Rushing | Vocal, Piano | 1990 |
| Pee Wee Russell | Clarinet | 2011 |
| Donald Ryan | Piano, Education | 2006 |
| Jessie Mae Renfro Sapp | Vocal | 1989 |
| Rudy Scott | Piano, Harmonica | 2011 |
| Lynn Seaton | Bass, Education | 2006 |
| Shadow Lake Eight | Band | 2013 |
| Lee Shaw | Piano | 1993 |
| Leslie Sheffield | Piano | 2003 |
| Hal Singer | Saxophone | 1996 |
| C.C. Skinner | Vocal | 1990 |
| David Skinner | Guitar | 2005 |
| Maurice Spears | Trombone, Education | 2004 |
| Louie Spears | Bass, Education | 2004 |
| Kay Starr | Vocal | 2000 |
| Ted Taylor | Vocal | 2000 |
| Flash Terry | Guitar, Vocal | 1994 |
| Oklahoma City Blue Devils | Big Band | 1990 |
| Walter "Foots" Thomas | Saxophone | 1996 |
| Wayman Tisdale | Bass | 2009 |
| Glenn R. Townsend | Guitar | 2004 |
| David T. Walker | Guitar | 1999 |
| Hart A. Wand | Fiddle | 2012 |
| Maxine Weldon | Vocal | 1999 |
| Lee Wiley | Vocal | 2000 |
| Floyd Wiley | Organ | 1994 |
| Stephen Wiley | Drums | 2009 |
| Steve Wilkerson | Saxophone, Education | 2005 |
| Claude Williams | Violin | 1989 |
| Wallis Willis | Vocal | 2010 |
| Joe Lee Wilson | Vocal | 2010 |
| Terry Woodson | Trombone, Education | 2010 |
| Joe William Wright | Drums | 2012 |

== See also ==
- Oklahoma Music Hall of Fame
- List of music museums
