= Tulsa Union Depot =

Coordinates: 36.155523°N 95.990652°W

Tulsa
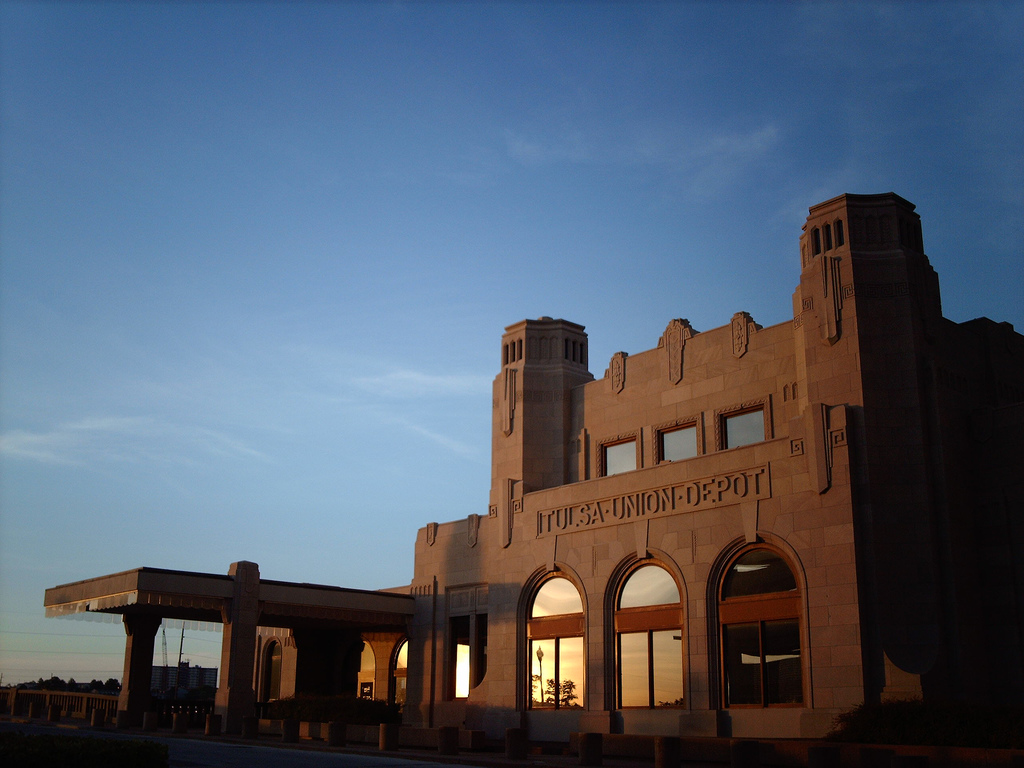
- Tulsa Union Depot, 2009

General information
- Other names: Tulsa Union Station
- Location: 5 S Boston Ave, Tulsa, OK 74103

Other information
- Status: School and Museum

History
- Opened: May 13, 1931
- Closed: May 13, 1967

Key dates
- 1980: Reopened

Services
| Preceding station | Atchison, Topeka and Santa Fe Railway | Following station |
|---|---|---|
| Terminus | Tulsa – Kansas City | Mohawk toward Kansas City |
| Preceding station | Missouri–Kansas–Texas Railroad | Following station |
| Sand Springs toward Osage | Osage – Wybark | Broken Arrow toward Wybark |
| Preceding station | St. Louis–San Francisco Railway | Following station |
| Sapulpa toward Oklahoma City | Main Line | Claremore toward St. Louis |
Location

The Tulsa Union Depot (also known as the Tulsa Union Station) is the former central railway station for Tulsa, Oklahoma. It has since been turned into an office building. The Oklahoma Jazz Hall of Fame is currently headquartered in the former Depot.

== History ==
The Depot was built in 1931, and was considered "the single best PWA symbol of hope for economic recovery during the bleak days of the depression." It cost $3.5 million, paid for by a bond issue passed in 1927. The Depot was the first central station in the city of Tulsa, and it unified the small Frisco (St. Louis-San Francisco Railway), Katy (M-K-T), and Santa Fe depots. Upon its completion, a crowd of over 60,000 people came to see the opening ceremonies, which included speeches, singing, dancing, and Indian stomp dancing. The event was even broadcast on radio. A new locomotive was unveiled, and the locomotive said to have brought the first passenger train into the city (Frisco's "Old 94") was showcased. The depot opened "Tulsa's important front door." At its peak, the depot served 36 trains a day.

The upper floor was the concourse level, with segregated waiting rooms on the east and west, flanking a central area for ticketing and baggage check-in. Direct access was via elevated entrances connected to the Boston and Cincinnati Avenue bridges over the St. Louis-San Francisco Railway tracks. An enclosed, elevated concourse extended north over five platform tracks; stairs led down to three passenger platforms. Escalators were later installed. The lower level served postal traffic, the Railway Express Agency (train-carried mail service) and passenger baggage; trucks were able to access this area directly via First Street.

Because of declining passenger train travel and the rise of air travel and the Interstate Highway System, the depot was abandoned after hosting its last passenger train in 1967. (The Santa Fe maintained passenger service to Tulsa until 1971, but they utilized a separate station.)

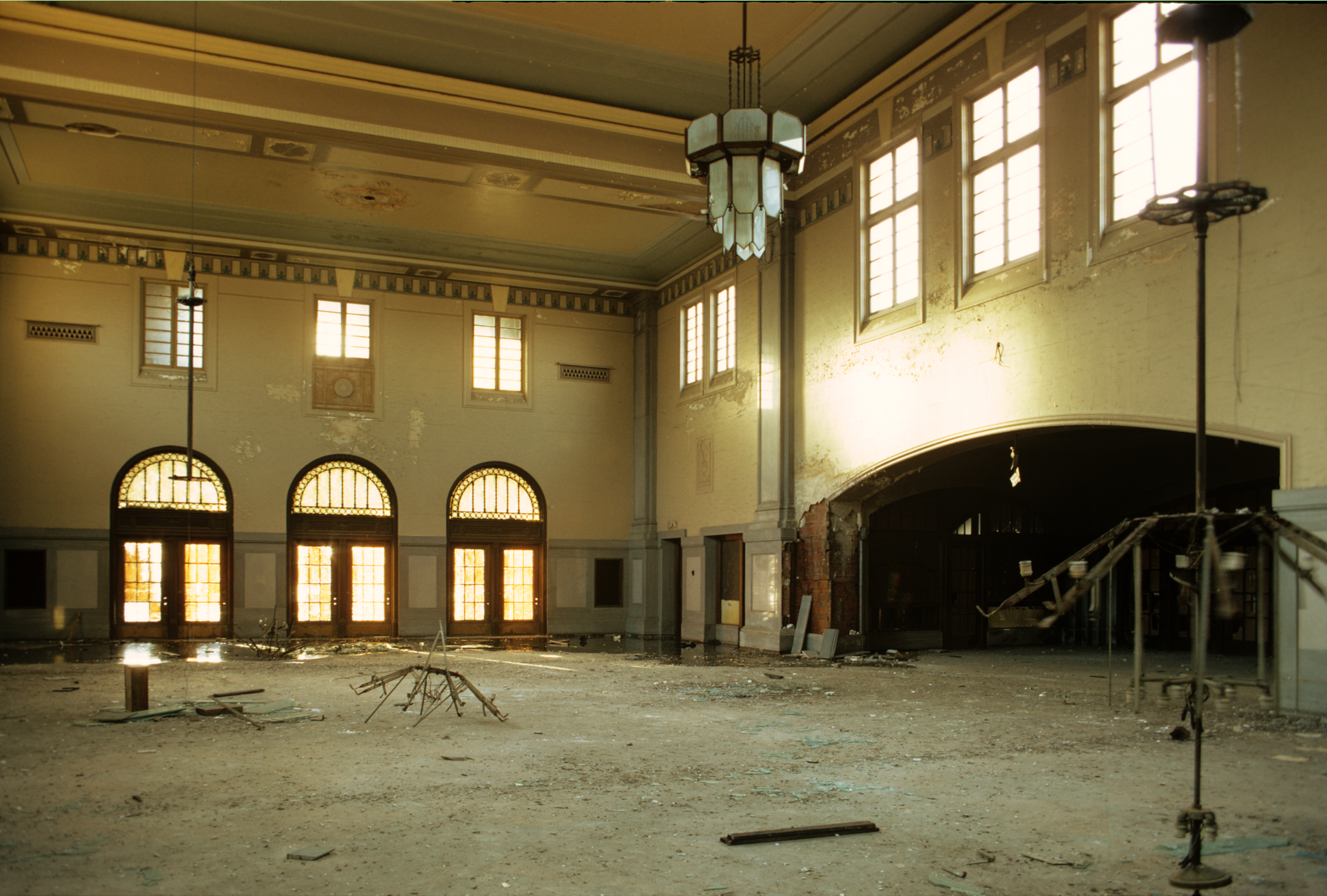
Tulsa Union Depot interior, under renovation

=== Named passenger trains ===
| Operators | Named trains | Northern destination | Southern destination | Year begun | Year discontinued |
|---|---|---|---|---|---|
| Frisco Railway | Black Gold | terminus | Oklahoma City | 1938 | 1959 |
| Frisco Railway | Firefly | Kansas City | Oklahoma City | 1939 | 1960 |
| Frisco Railway | Meteor | St. Louis | Lawton | 1902 | 1964 |
| M-K-T | Bluebonnet | terminus | Galveston via Dallas and Houston | 1928 | 1958 |
| M-K-T | Katy Flyer | terminus | Galveston via Dallas and Houston | 1896; 1900 | 1959 |
| M-K-T | Texas Special | St. Louis | San Antonio via Dallas | 1915 | 1965 |
| Santa Fe | Tulsan | Chicago | terminus | 1930 | 1971 |

=== Renaissance ===
In 1980, the Williams Companies purchased the structure, and tasked designer Urban Design Group and contractor Manhattan Construction (the same company that built the depot in 1931) with restoring the same. In 1983 after completion, those companies leased space to make it their headquarters and offices.

In 2004 Tulsa County purchased the building from the Williams Companies for $2.2 million and used the balance of $4 million in Vision 2025 funds for renovations. The building was turned over to the Tulsa County Industrial Authority, which then signed a 99-year lease with the Oklahoma Jazz Hall of Fame for $1. The Jazz Hall began operations at the site in 2007, though did not formally take control of the building until 2009. The lease called for the Jazz Hall to cover its own operating expenses; and, some controversy arose on occasions when bill payments were late. The Jazz Hall started calling the building the Jazz Depot.

Before possible restoration of passenger train service to Tulsa via the Eastern Flyer proposal fell through, Tulsa city councilors discussed the likelihood of using a portion of the Jazz Depot for its original purpose of serving as a downtown rail terminal for the city, although other sites were also proposed such as the Center of the Universe location further to the northwest in Downtown Tulsa.

In November, 2020, The Tulsa County Industrial Authority (TCIA) filed a lawsuit to terminate the building lease with the Jazz Hall and to recover $8,474 in past-due taxes and utilities. The suit alleged that the Jazz Hall was so far behind in its utility payments that electricity to the building was turned off on October 19. In January 2021 the Jazz Hall declared bankruptcy. On June 10, 2021, the bankruptcy court approved a $200,000 sale of the Jazz Hall, along with transfer of the lease of the Depot, to a new non-profit entity, The Jazz Foundation LLC, being a firm established by local businessman James Moore. That bid included a pledge of $1 million for deferred maintenance and other improvements, along with $1 million available for operating expenses and to satisfy future obligations under the lease with TCIA.

By July 2022, renovations had begun on the facility, with a reopening originally expected in early 2023 as simply the Jazz Depot. The Jazz Foundation has funded $2 million in renovation updates for the second-floor Grand Entrance Hall, Exhibit Promenade and Performance Hall. The hope is to turn the building into a venue for concerts with a capacity of about 500, as well as space for private events and receptions. Renovations were continuing in July 2026, and no time frame for reopening had been determined.

== Architecture ==
The Depot was built in an Art-Deco style by architect R.C. Stephens of St. Louis, MO. The Manhattan Construction Company served as the general contractor. Design elements included chevrons, winged wheels, and Deco sunbursts. The Art-Deco Style with machine-styled elements was very popular, even a "something of a mania" in Tulsa.

In the renovations begun in 2022, the developers are retaining many original elements such as the winged-wheel plaques; but, because many features in the building were not salvageable, they have added new similarly themed art deco features, such as murals.
