= Oklahoma Music Hall of Fame =

American music award

Oklahoma Music Hall of Fame & Museum
- Friends of Oklahoma Music
- Interactive map of Oklahoma Music Hall of Fame & Museum
- Address: 401 South 3rd Street; Muskogee, Oklahoma; United States
- Coordinates: 35.745782°N 95.373498°W
- Owner: City of Muskogee
- Type: Theater and museum

Construction
- Opened: 2003
- Years active: 1997 - present

Website
- omhof.com

The Oklahoma Music Hall of Fame, located in Muskogee, Oklahoma, honors Oklahoma musicians for their lifetime achievements in music. The induction ceremony and concert are held each year in Muskogee. Since its establishment in 1997, the Hall of Fame has inducted more than 100 individuals or groups, held numerous concerts, and renovated in part the facility that will educate Oklahomans for generations about those innovators and industry icons from Oklahoma.

== History ==
In 1996, the Oklahoma Legislature began the vision for the Hall of Fame. State Senator Benn Robinson (D-Muskogee) and State Representative Barbara Staggs (D-Muskogee) co-authored a concurrent resolution designating Muskogee as the site of the Oklahoma Music Hall of Fame. State Representative Bill Settle (D-Muskogee) continued to champion the cause by securing legislative appropriations that served to further promote the Oklahoma Music Hall of Fame. In 1997, Friends of Oklahoma Music was incorporated to serve as producer for annual induction ceremony events. In that same year, Friends of Oklahoma Music hosted and produced the first Oklahoma Music Hall of Fame Induction Ceremony and Concert at the Muskogee Civic Center. Two years later, in 1999, Governor of Oklahoma Frank Keating created the Oklahoma Music Hall of Fame Board and appointed seven members to facilitate fundraising, site selection, and construction of a facility honoring the history and legacy of Oklahoma's music, which has contributed so much to the history and roots of American music.

In 2003, Friends of Oklahoma Music entered into a long-term lease agreement with the City of Muskogee and completed phase one of renovation to The Frisco Freight Depot, an old train depot. In October 2003, Friends and The Oklahoma Music Hall of Fame moved their offices into the Depot, which is the site of the future Oklahoma Music Hall of Fame Museum. In 2004, Friends of Oklahoma Music was renamed Oklahoma Music Hall of Fame Foundation. Then in 2005, the Hall of Fame assumed its current name by being renamed Oklahoma Music Hall of Fame & Museum.

The museum closed for renovations about 16 months starting in 2025, reopening September 26, 2026. The exhibits now arrange the history of Oklahoma music chronologically. The red caboose near the entrance is actually a theater room featuring a loop showing Hall of Fame inductees. Interactive attractions include an AI workstation from which visitors can create their own album covers. The museum has a renovated stage area, and hosts live music on Thursdays.

== Inductees ==
=== 1997 ===
- Merle Haggard
- Woody Guthrie
- Patti Page
- Claude Williams

=== 1998 ===
- Gene Autry
- Albert E. Brumley
- David Gates
- Jay McShann

=== 1999 ===
- Byron Berline
- Vince Gill
- Barney Kessel
- KVOO

=== 2000 ===
- Roy Clark
- Color Me Badd
- Wanda Jackson
- The Oklahoma City Blue Devils
- Jim Halsey

=== 2001 ===
- Leona Mitchell
- Caddo Nation
- The Texas Playboys
- Bob Wills
- Johnnie Lee Wills
- Billy Jack Wills
- Luke Wills

=== 2002 ===
- Hank Thompson
- Joe Diffie
- Kay Starr
- Charlie Christian

=== 2003 ===
- Ronnie Dunn
- Benny Garcia Jr.
- Flash Terry
- D.C. Minner
- John Wooley
- Lee Wiley
- Keith Anderson—Rising Star Award

=== 2004 ===
- Dr. Louis Ballard
- Merle Kilgore
- Roger Miller

=== 2005 ===
- Tommy Allsup
- Cain's Ballroom
- Toby Keith
- Billy Parker
- Carrie Underwood—Rising Star Award

=== 2006 ===
- Leon Russell
- Mel McDaniel
- Carl Radle
- Eldon Shamblin
- Barbara Staggs

=== 2007 ===
- Hoyt Axton
- Mae Boren Axton
- Tommy Crook
- Cal Smith
- Sammi Smith
- Hinder—Rising Star Award

=== 2008 ===
- Bob Childers
- Chick Rains
- The All-American Rejects—Rising Star Award
- Cherokee National Youth Choir
- Wichita and Affiliated Tribes

=== 2009 ===
- Carrie Underwood
- Ramona Reed
- Rocky Frisco
- C.H. Parker

=== 2010 ===
- Jean Shepard
- Les Gilliam
- Sam Harris
- Jamie Oldaker

=== 2011 ===
- Kristin Chenoweth
- Gene Triplett
- Nole "Nokie" Edwards
- Cheevers Toppah
- Jesse Ed Davis
- Wayman Tisdale
- Ralph Blane
- Robert Lenard "Bob" Bogle
- Kings of Leon—Rising Star Award

=== 2013 ===
- Jimmy Webb
- Mason Williams
- Sandi Patty
- Norma Jean Beasler
- Neal Schon
- Barbara McAlister
- Mabee Center
- Bob Dunn
- Thompson Square—Rising Star Award
- The Swon Brothers—Rising Star Award
- Roger Davis

=== 2014 ===
- J. J. Cale
- Jim Keltner
- Chuck Blackwell
- Elvin Bishop
- Lowell Fulsom
- John Fullbright—Rising Star Award

=== 2015 ===
- Restless Heart
- Tim DuBois
- Scott Hendricks
- Becky Hobbs
- Smiley Weaver

=== 2016 ===
- B.J. Thomas

=== 2017 ===
- Bill Grant
- Hanson
- Rodney Lay
- Red Dirt Rangers
- David Teegarden Sr.
- Jimmy Markham
- Carl Belew
- Jimmy LaFave

=== 2018 ===
- Cassie Gaines
- Steve Gaines
- Point of Grace
- Smokie Norful
- Dennis Jernigan
- Jody Miller
- Gail Davies
- Gayle Peevey
- Katrina Elam
- Gus Hardin
- Lorrie Collins
- Kellie Coffey
- Evelyn Pittman
- Molly Bee
- Michael Brewer

=== 2019 ===
- Molly Bee
- Kellie Coffey
- Lorrie Collins
- Gail Davies
- Katrina Elam
- Gus Hardin
- Jody Miller
- Gayla Peevey
- Evelyn LaRue Pittman

=== 2020 ===
- David Osborne
- Kelly Lang
- Don Byas
- Wade Hayes
- Mike Settle

=== 2021 ===
- Scott Musick (The Call)
- Steve Huddleston (The Call)
- Michael Been (The Call)
- Jerry Lynn Williams
- Ann Bell
- Tommy Collins

=== 2022 ===
- Randy Crouch
- Mike McClure
- Don White
- Don Byas

=== 2023 ===
- Ricochet
- Bryan White
- Timothy Long
- Verlon Thompson
- Jerry Huffer
- David Webb
- Shelby Eicher

=== 2024 ===
- Stoney LaRue
- Jason Boland & The Stragglers
- The Great Divide
- Cross Canadian Ragweed

== See also ==
- List of music museums
