= Dusk Til Dawn Blues Festival =

American music festival

The Dusk Til Dawn Blues Festival is an annual event in Rentiesville, Oklahoma, United States, which attracts many national and internationally known blues artists.

== Background ==
The festival attracts blues musicians and fans of the blues who make their way there from across the many parts of the United States. The festival was first put together in Rentiesville, Oklahoma by blues musician D.C. Minner and his wife Selby Minner in 1991. They had six acts heading the festival. About 700 people came along on the first weekend. By the early 2000s, the festival was attracting 5,000. It is now considered to be part of Oklahoma's blues heritage.

When it ran in 2001 from August 31 to September 2, the acts included Flash Terry, D.C. Minner, Selby & Blues on the Move and Tony Matthews.

Minner died in 2008 but the festival has continued after his death.

== Recent ==
In September 2015, the 25th annual festival ran. It featured around 35 acts performing on stage, from 5 PM until 5 AM, over a period of three days on Labor Day weekend from Friday to Sunday. Some of the acts scheduled to perform were the Checotah High School Jazz Band on stage with blues guitarist Roger "Hurricane" Wilson, The Roxy Spotlighters, Johnny Rawls and Larry Garner.
