= Freedom Child (opera) =

1972 opera

Freedom Child is a 1972 opera by the American composer Evelyn La Rue Pittman, in memory of Martin Luther King Jr.
