= Lee Shaw =

American jazz musician

Lee Shaw (June 25, 1926 – October 25, 2015), was an American jazz pianist and composer. Born Londa Lee Moore in Cushing, Oklahoma, but raised in Ada, Shaw would listen to the radio then play on the piano the songs she heard, as well as learn songs from the Great American Songbook.

== Background ==
Shaw studied piano classically at Oklahoma College for Women and obtained a master's degree at the American Conservatory of Music in Chicago. It was there that she met drummer Stan Shaw in 1961. They married within six months and formed the Lee Shaw Trio, playing pop standards in restaurants and nightclubs around Chicago. She claimed to have never heard the term "jazz" until attending a Count Basie concert. She studied with Oscar Peterson, who offered his tutelage after hearing her play.

== Lee Shaw Trio ==
The Lee Shaw Trio performed extensively across the country, including in her native Oklahoma, where she was inducted into the Oklahoma Jazz Hall of Fame in June 1993. With Stan's health decline in the late-1990s and death in 2001, the trio was reformed and, every year from 2007 to 2009, toured Europe. A concert in Austria, recorded by the ORF, was the basis for the 2008 album and DVD, Live in Graz.

== Documentary ==
In 2013, filmmaker Susan Robbins began working on a documentary about Shaw, titled Lee's 88 Keys, after meeting her in 1998 and later attending the frail woman's memorable performance years later. The documentary was released in April 2015. Shaw attended and accepted the 2015 Jazz Hero Award from the Jazz Journalists' Association.

== Health and death ==
In January 2015, Shaw was hospitalized for pneumonia, heart attack and stroke, which were considered complications from chronic obstructive pulmonary disease. She had also survived three types of cancer. She recovered with rehabilitation and entered a nursing home, where she still played piano. On October 25, 2015, Shaw died in a hospice in Troy, New York. She was 89.

== Discography ==
- Lee Shaw OK! (Cadence, 1984)
- Essence (CIMP, 1997)
- A Place for Jazz (Cadence, 2002)
- Together Again with John Medeski (ARC, 2010)
- Live at Caspe Terrace (Cadence, 2014)
