= Kenneth Kilgore =

American jazz musician and educator

- Born: January 26, 1947; Oklahoma City, Oklahoma, US
- Died: April 14, 2011 (aged 64)
- Occupation: Jazz musician
- Years active: 1970–2010

Kenneth Kilgore (January 26, 1947 – April 14, 2011) was an American jazz musician, a Minister of Music, and an educator. He founded the Ambassadors' Concert Choir in 1979 and the choir performed with other musicians at multiple events. He won several awards and a bridge in Oklahoma City was named in his honor two years after his death.

== Personal life ==
Kenneth Kilgore was born in Oklahoma City, Oklahoma, on January 26, 1947, and spent his childhood there. His father Leonard Kilgore died when Kenneth was 16 years old and his mother was Lola Peters Kilgore. Of all the children his parents had from prior relationships, Kilgore was the youngest child and the only child from his parents' relationship together. He graduated from Douglass High School and attended Bishop College in Dallas, Texas, where he received a bachelor's degree.

In January 1969, Kilgore began teaching at the mostly white Herald Elementary School in Oklahoma City. At the time, public schools in Oklahoma City were going through racial integration and Kilgore was placed there as the first black teacher. Kilgore attended Langston University in Oklahoma after deciding that he wanted more schooling in the 1990s. He received a Master of Education degree at Langston and a Doctorate in Educational Administration from Oklahoma State University.

== Music career ==
Kilgore became the Minister of Music at St. John Missionary Baptist Church in 1970. He founded the Ambassadors' Concert Choir in 1979 as part of St. John's and was also its artistic director. In 1992, Kilgore was inducted into the Oklahoma Jazz Hall of Fame. His choir performed with Luis Herrera de la Fuente and la Fuente's Mineria Symphony Orchestra in Mexico City in 1987. He performed in Mexico City again in 1991 and 1994. In 1996, the Ambassadors' Concert Choir performed on nation-wide television for the first anniversary of the Oklahoma City bombing. In 2002, the choir held a performance with Vince Gill to celebrate the Oklahoma State Capitol dome dedication. They performed with the opera singers Simon Estes and Leona Mitchell. Kilgore's other awards are "the State of Oklahoma Arts Award; Oklahoma Musician of the Year from the Oklahoma Federation of Music Club; Arts & Letters Conducting Award presented by the Delta Sigma Theta sorority; and Excellence in Performance presented by Langston University." He retired in 2010.

== Death and legacy ==
Kilgore died on April 14, 2011, due to health complications. A bridge on Oklahoma City's Interstate 44 was named after him as the Maestro Kenneth Kilgore Memorial Bridge on July 1, 2013. The dedication ceremony was held in August 2013 and music from the Ambassadors' Concert Choir was played. Politician Mike Shelton said,

I am very proud of his accomplishments and what he did to influence the musical arts in this state. His career was long, successful and left a legacy behind. We miss him to this day, but with this naming we all will be able to see his name on the highway on a daily basis. This sign going up will keep his memory alive for generations to come.
