= Roger "Hurricane" Wilson =

American singer

- Born: Roger Wilson; July 27, 1953 (age 73); Newark, New Jersey, United States
- Genres: Electric blues
- Occupations: Guitarist, singer, songwriter, music educator, radio dj, music journalist, broadcaster, record label owner
- Instruments: Guitar, vocals
- Years active: 1972–present
- Labels: Hottrax Records, BlueStorm Records
- Website: Official website

Roger "Hurricane" Wilson (born July 27, 1953) is an American electric blues guitarist, singer and songwriter. He has also worked as a music educator, radio DJ, music journalist and broadcaster. In addition he is an advisory board member of the Georgia Music Industry Association, and an International Blues Challenge judge. To date he has released over a dozen albums. Wilson started playing professionally in 1972, and he has jammed with Les Paul, Hubert Sumlin, Stevie Ray Vaughan, Albert Collins, Roy Buchanan, Savoy Brown, Magic Slim, Michael Burks, and Charlie Musselwhite. He has also shared the stage with B.B. King, Buddy Guy, Little Milton, John Mayall, Marcia Ball, Delbert McClinton, Taj Mahal, Leon Russell, and Edgar Winter.

Les Paul once commented about Wilson, "this guy plays some great blues!"

== Life and career ==
Wilson was born in Newark, New Jersey, United States. Wilson's family relocated to Keansburg, New Jersey, when Roger was one year old, before the town was badly damaged in September 1960 by Hurricane Donna. He attended his first guitar lesson in January 1963, at age nine. Later on, Wilson started taking trumpet lessons to join his elementary school marching band, although he would have preferred to play the drums. In February 1964, Wilson witnessed the Beatles make their debut on the Ed Sullivan Show. Wilson acquired his first electric guitar, and for the next two years he played in various garage bands. With no local high school alternative, Wilson travelled to Woodward Academy (formerly the Georgia Military Academy) in Atlanta, Georgia, from 1967.

By 1970, Wilson saw the Allman Brothers play free concerts in Atlanta's Piedmont Park. During his final year in high school, Wilson became drum major in the school's marching band. Following Duane Allman's death in 1971, Wilson investigated Allman's love of Delta blues musicians such as Robert Johnson and Elmore James. In 1972, Wilson worked at a college radio station and acquainted himself with the work of other bluesmen including Roy Buchanan, Freddie King, Albert King, and James Cotton. The following year he opened his own 'Roger Wilson Guitar Studio' in Atlanta and subsequently taught guitar there for 14 years. In 1974, Wilson worked as a freelance music journalist, writing for The Great Speckled Bird. As part of this work, Wilson went to Alex Cooley's Electric Ballroom and interviewed Roy Buchanan. Having played professionally since 1972, he started the "Roger Wilson Band" in 1978, which opened for both Albert Collins, and 38 Special, before breaking up in 1983. They also played at the Electric Ballroom, some four years after Wilson had interviewed Buchanan at the same venue. He later formed "Roger Wilson & the Low Overhead Band", which shared the stage with Albert King, Dickey Betts, Little Feat, Three Dog Night, Leon Russell, Edgar Winter, the Marshall Tucker Band and Roomful of Blues.

Wilson had a parallel career in broadcasting, undertaking weekend work at the local AM radio station, WGUN, a job which lasted for 12 years. Wilson married in 1981. In 1986, he obtained full-time employment with CNN that lasted a decade. His stage work led to confusion over his name and, by 1993, had become Roger "Hurricane" Wilson, partly in recognition of the devastation caused to his home back in 1960.

His debut solo album, Hurricane Blues, was released in 1994 on Hottrax Records. Live From the Eye of the Storm (1996) followed, with Wilson undertaking lengthy touring commitments across the nation. He set up his own record label in 1997, and Business of the Blues (1998) was his first release on that label, with the title track alluding to the rigours of constant travelling and performing. In 2000, he did the recording work for Live at the Stanhope House, which was released the following year. In September 2003, Wilson joined Les Paul on stage to play what became a regular guest spot for the former at the Iridium Jazz Club in New York City.

A purely acoustic album, Pastime, was issued in 2004, and two years later The Way I Am followed.

In 2012, a collaborative live album was released featuring Wilson and Willie "Big Eyes" Smith, which was recorded during one of the four tours that the pair did throughout the U.S. from 2008 through 2010. Over the past decade, Wilson has been involved with the nationwide Blues in the Schools program. At the 2006 Springing the Blues festival in Jacksonville Beach, Florida, Wilson was presented with the 'Key to the City' for his participation in Blues in the Schools in Jacksonville. Wilson performed at the 2015 Dusk Til Dawn Blues Festival accompanied by the Checotah High School Jazz Band. A CD was issued based on the live recording.

Wilson is currently crowdfunding to raise monies to enable the release of a double live album by Wilson and the Hurricane Homeboys (featuring Marvin Mahanay on bass and Billy Jeansonne on drums). This was recorded on Christmas night 2015 at the Subourbon Bar in Kennesaw, Georgia.

Wilson's autobiography, Hurricane, is due for release in 2016. He currently resides in Kennesaw.

== Discography ==
=== Albums ===
Year	Title	Record label	Credited to
1994	Hurricane Blues	Hottrax Records	Roger "Hurricane" Wilson
1996	Live From the Eye of the Storm	Hottrax Records	Roger "Hurricane" Wilson
1998	Business of the Blues	BlueStorm Records	Roger "Hurricane" Wilson
2001	Live at the Stanhope House	BlueStorm Records	Roger "Hurricane" Wilson
2004	Pastime	BlueStorm Records	Roger "Hurricane" Wilson
2006	The Way I Am	BlueStorm Records	Roger "Hurricane" Wilson
2007	Ohio Connection	BlueStorm Records	Roger "Hurricane" Wilson
2008	Exodus	BlueStorm Records	Roger "Hurricane" Wilson
2011	Rainbow Up Ahead	CD Baby	Roger "Hurricane" Wilson
2012	Live Blues Protected By Smith & Wilson	BlueStorm Records	Willie "Big Eyes" Smith & Roger "Hurricane" Wilson
2012	Simply & Acoustically: Merry Christmas	BlueStorm Records	Roger "Hurricane" Wilson
2013	Live at the 2012 Amelia Island Blues Festival	CD Baby	Roger "Hurricane" Wilson
2014	Live in Concert	BlueStorm Records	Roger "Hurricane" Wilson & The Fletcher High School Jazz Band
2016	Live at the 2015 Rentiesville Dusk 'til Dawn Blues Festival	BlueStorm Records	Roger "Hurricane" Wilson & The Checotah High School Band

== See also ==
- List of electric blues musicians
