= BOK Center =

Multi-purpose arena in Tulsa, Oklahoma, U.S.

Coordinates: 36°9′9.8″N 95°59′46.8″W

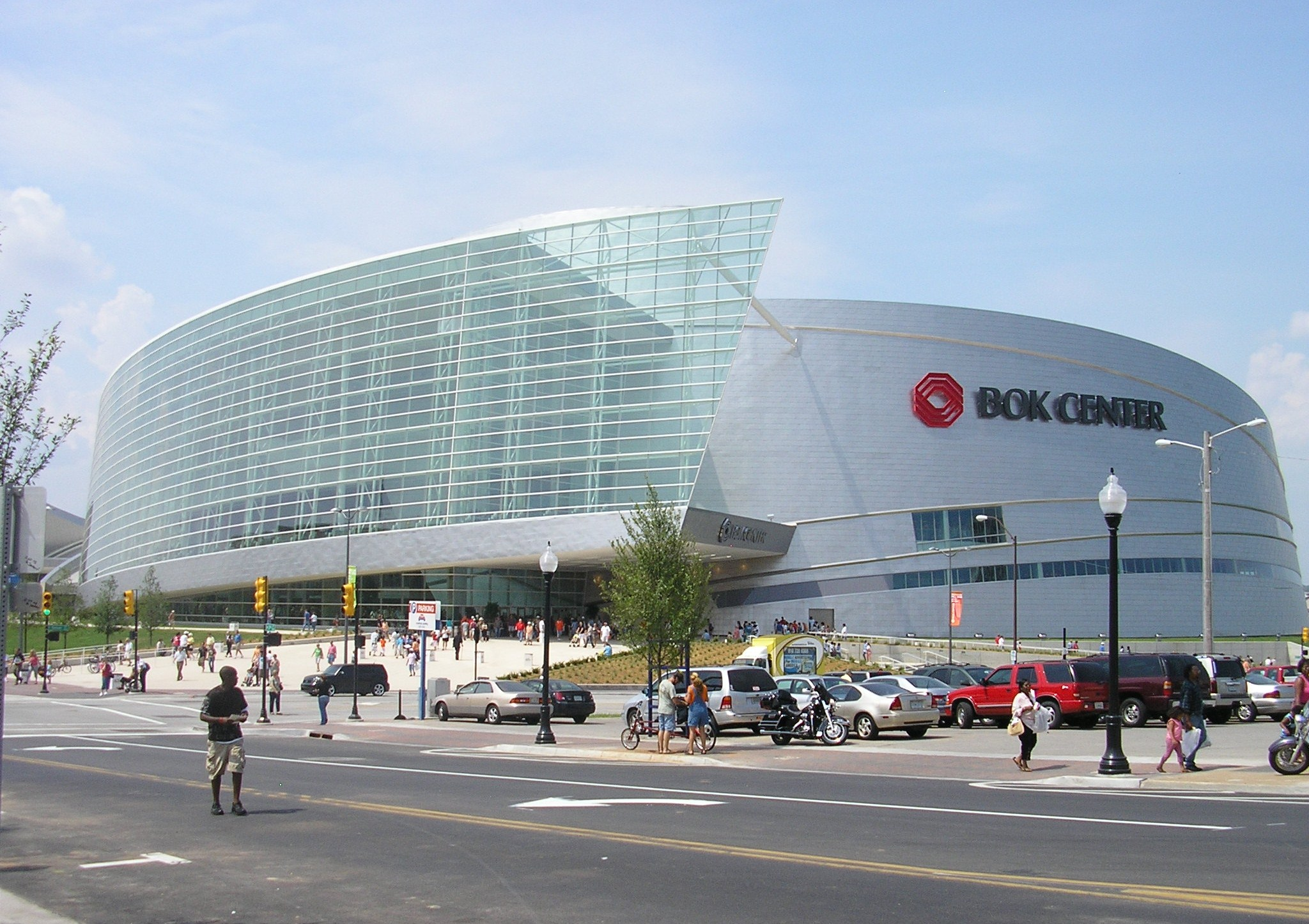

- Location within Oklahoma Location within the United States
- Full name: Bank of Oklahoma Center
- Address: 200 South Denver Avenue West
- Location: Tulsa, Oklahoma, United States
- Owner: City of Tulsa
- Operator: Oak View Group
- Capacity: Central stage: 19,199; Basketball: 17,839; Hockey: 17,096; Arena football: 16,582; End stage: 13,644

Construction
- Groundbreaking: August 31, 2005
- Opened: August 30, 2008
- Cost: US$196 million ($293 million in 2024 dollars)
- Architects: Pelli Clarke Pelli; MATRIX Architects, Inc. Odell Associates
- Structural engineer: Thornton Tomasetti
- Services engineer: Lancorp Engineering
- General contractors: Tulsa Vision Builders, a joint venture between Flintco Inc. and Manhattan Construction Company

Tenants
- Tulsa Oilers (ECHL) (2008–present); Tulsa Oilers (IFL) (2023–present); Tulsa Talons (AF2/AFL) (2009–2011); Tulsa Shock (WNBA) (2010–2015)

Website
- bokcenter.com

BOK Center, or Bank of Oklahoma Center, is a 19,199-seat multi-purpose arena and a primary indoor sports and event venue in Tulsa, Oklahoma, United States. The two current permanent tenants are the Tulsa Oilers of the ECHL and the Tulsa Oilers of the Indoor Football League, both teams owned by Andy Scurto. The BOK Center is also the former home of the Tulsa Shock of the Women's National Basketball Association and the Tulsa Talons of the Arena Football League.

The facility was built at a cost of $178 million in public funds and $18 million in privately funded upgrades. Ground was broken on August 31, 2005, and a ribbon-cutting ceremony took place on August 30, 2008.

Designed by César Pelli, the architect of the Petronas Towers in Malaysia, the BOK Center is the flagship project of Tulsa County's Vision 2025 long-range development initiative. Local firm, Matrix Architects Engineers Planners, Inc, is the architect and engineer of record. The arena is managed and operated by OVG and named for the Bank of Oklahoma, which purchased naming rights for $11 million.

== Design ==
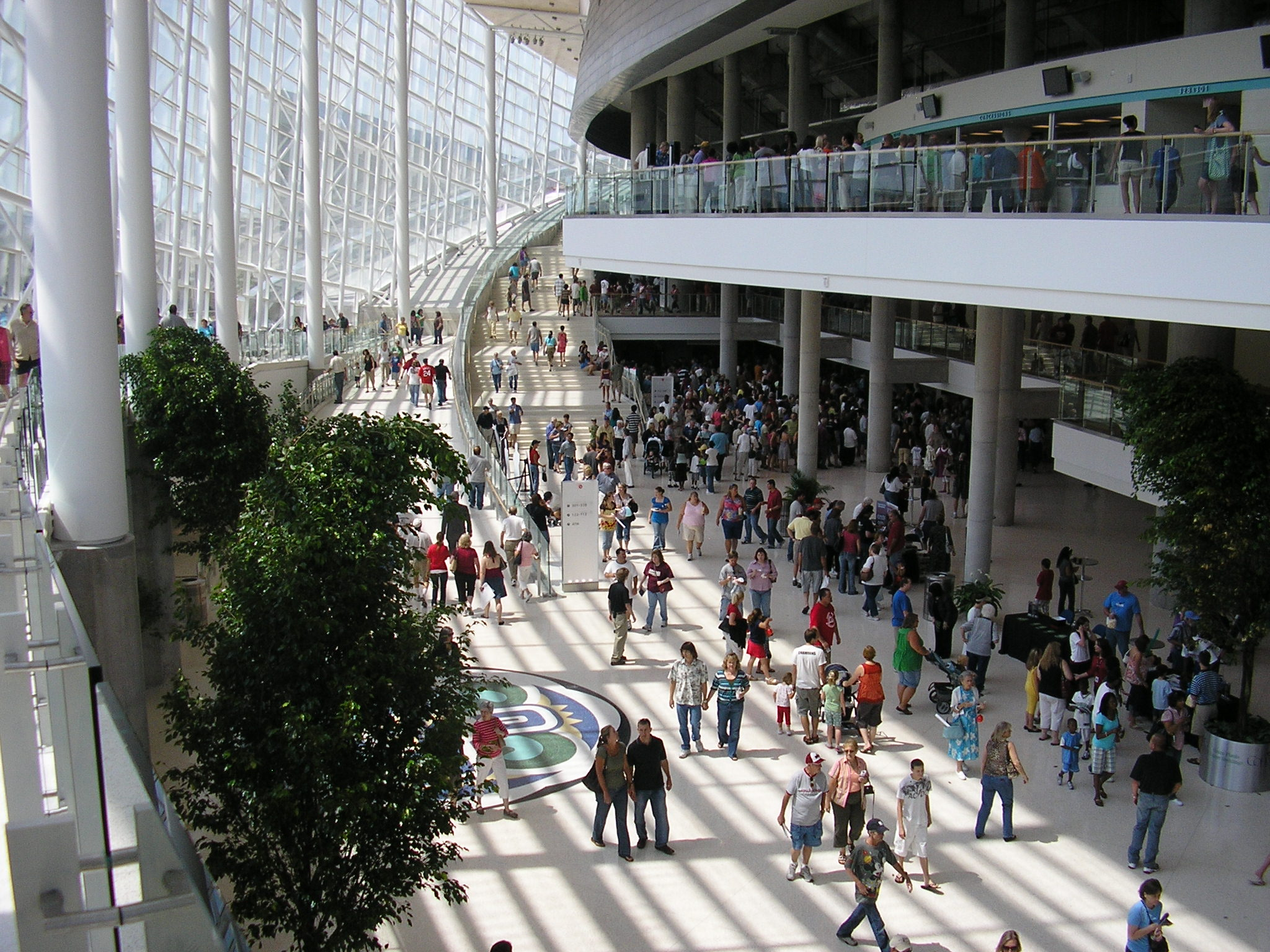
The arena's main lobby. Terrazzo flooring features Native American artwork.

Tulsa city officials asked César Pelli to create an arena that would be an architectural icon. To achieve this, Pelli employed cultural and architectural themes of the city, including Native American, art deco, and contemporary styles. He made heavy use of swirling circular elements in the exterior and interior designs of the building. A 103-foot (31 m), 600-foot (180 m) long glass facade featuring 1,600 350-pound (160 kg) panels wrap around the building in an escalating motion leaning at a five-degree angle. 33,000 stainless steel panels produced and installed by Zahner continue the upward spiraling path around the circumference of the structure. The interior follows the motion, with grand staircases that wrap around a portion of the building from the main lobby. In total, the building's design required 350,000 square feet (33,000 m^{2}) of exterior stainless steel panels, 75,000 square feet (7,000 m^{2}) of glass, 30,000 cubic yards (23,000 m^{3}) of concrete, and 4,000 tons of structural steel.

The arena encompasses 565,000 square feet (52,500 m^{2}) and reaches a maximum height of 134 feet (41 m). Inside, the bowl area's ceiling rises 120 feet (37 m) over the base floor and a 930-foot (280 m)-long HD ribbon screen wraps around the three-level seating area. There are 17,343 fixed seats, each ranging from 20 inches (51 cm) to 22 inches (56 cm) wide—an average width greater than the industry standard, including that of Paycom Center in Oklahoma City. Actual capacity fluctuates with configuration patterns, and total seating can vary from 13,644 to 19,199—13,644 for partial-use concerts, 16,582 for arena football, 17,096 for hockey, 17,839 for basketball, and 19,199 for center stage concerts. The bowl area's second floor, an exclusive carpeted level with a complete bar, houses press areas and 37 luxury suites, each with 15 22-inch (56 cm) seats and furnished gathering and kitchen areas. In the main concourse, more than 130,000 square feet (12,000 m^{2}) of terrazzo flooring has aggregate that contains 70% mother of pearl. Private funding exceeded original forecasts, and unexpected increases in revenue from corporate sponsorships, donations, and purchases of box seats and luxury boxes paid for an advanced light display for the glass wall that wraps around the front of the building and the scoreboard.

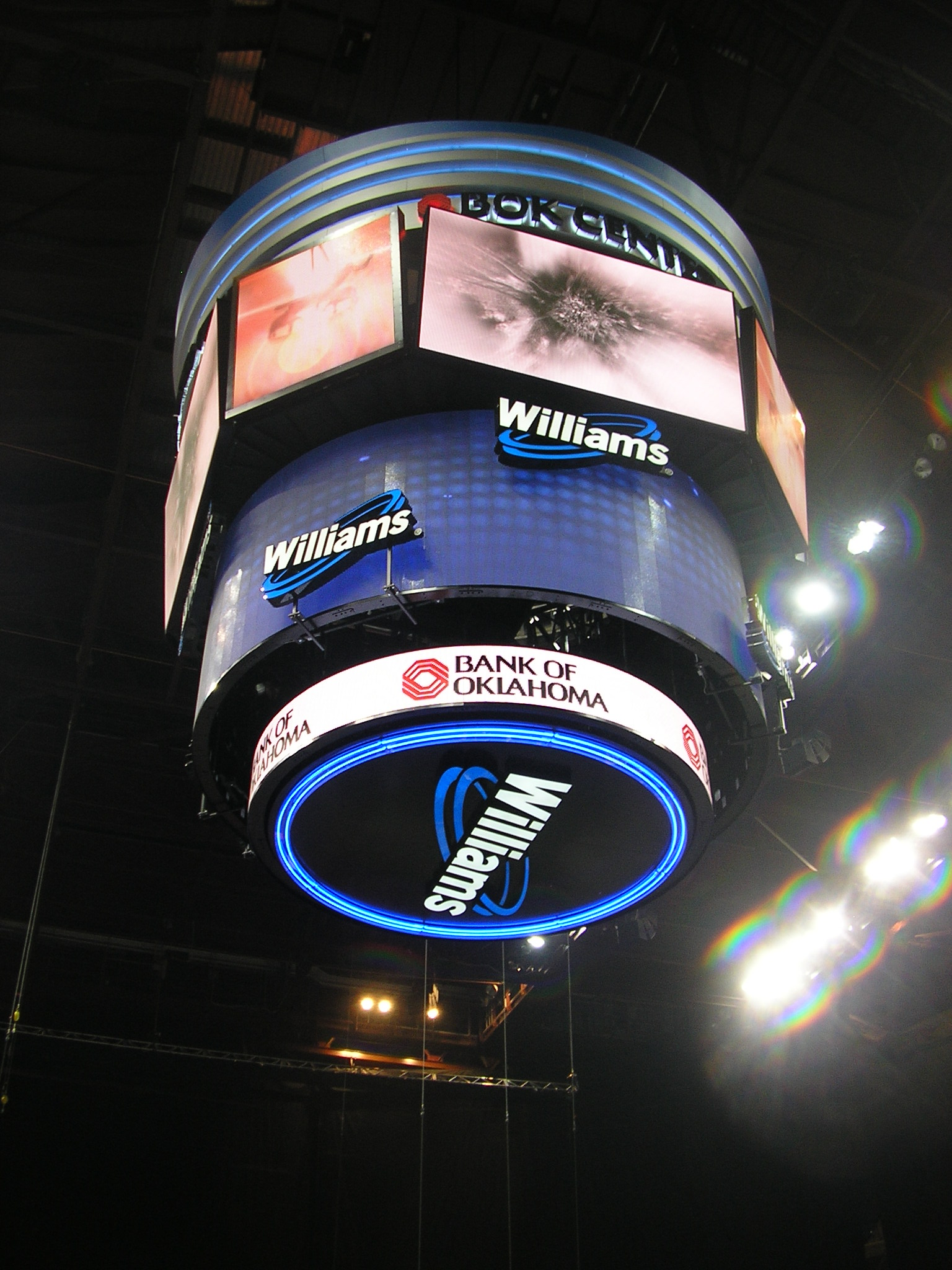
The BOK Center's 30-by-33-foot (9.1 m × 10.1 m) scoreboard was funded with $3.6 million in private donations.

=== Amenities ===
The BOK Center holds 37 public restrooms—12 men's restrooms, 16 women's restrooms, and 9 family restrooms—with 300 toilets and urinals. Dressing rooms with wooden lockers, hydrotherapy and workout rooms, a players lounge, locker rooms for game officials, and office space for coaches, trainers, and equipment managers are also located within the building. The arena's hanging scoreboard, is suspended above the arena floor and measures 50,000 pounds (23,000 kg) and 30 by 33 feet (9.1 m × 10.1 m), making use of four 8 by 14 feet (2.4 m × 4.3 m) HD screens, four 8 by 8 feet (2.4 m × 2.4 m) HD screens, a wrap-around 9-foot (2.7 m) HD screen, and another 3-foot (0.91 m) wrap-around HD screen. Designed by Forty Forty Agency and manufactured by Daktronics, the project received $3.6 million in private donations, with some funds going toward an advanced video recording system.

There are 14 concession outlets, seven of which belong to Tulsa-area restaurants that supplement typical arena food. Restaurant branches within the building are Billy's On the Square (American fast-casual), Mazzio's, Papa John's, Doc Popcorn, and The Dog House (hot dogs). General concessions serve Mexican food at Wholly Tacomoli, stuffed pretzels and hot dogs at Backstage, gourmet hot dogs at Frank's, chicken baskets and baked potatoes at Fuel and chicken sandwiches and veggie burgers at Roadie's Grill.

Nearly $1.5 million was allocated to artwork within the building in light of a city ordinance mandating that at least 1% of construction costs for any municipal project be used for public art. Tulsa's Arts Commission selected five artists out of nearly 300 applicants to decorate the interior of the building with the intention of capturing the spirit of the city and state. Of their pieces, the largest is a cloud-like cloth sculpture designed by Kendell Buster that weighs 5,000 pounds (2,300 kg) and hangs above the main concourse. Four 22-foot (6.7 m) Native American medallions designed by Bill and Demos Glass decorate the main concourse floor, along with a series of 25 paintings of tallgrass prairie landscapes created by Mark Lewis that adorn a wall on the main lobby's third level. A 9 by 24 feet (2.7 m × 7.3 m) black-and-white painting of rearing horses created by Joe Andoe hangs on a wall near a concession stand on the north side of the building, and a light display created by Jenny Holzer is also within the arena.

== Ownership and management ==
The city of Tulsa owns the arena but has a five-year management contract worth $950,000 with SMG property management, the largest arena manager in the world. SMG, which also manages the nearby Cox Business Center in addition to Paycom Center and Prairie Surf Studios in Oklahoma City, employs more than 70 full-time workers and 400 part-time workers in Tulsa and assumes the building's annual operations cost of $6,267,752. Evan Falat is currently serving as the interim general manager of the BOK Center.

== History ==
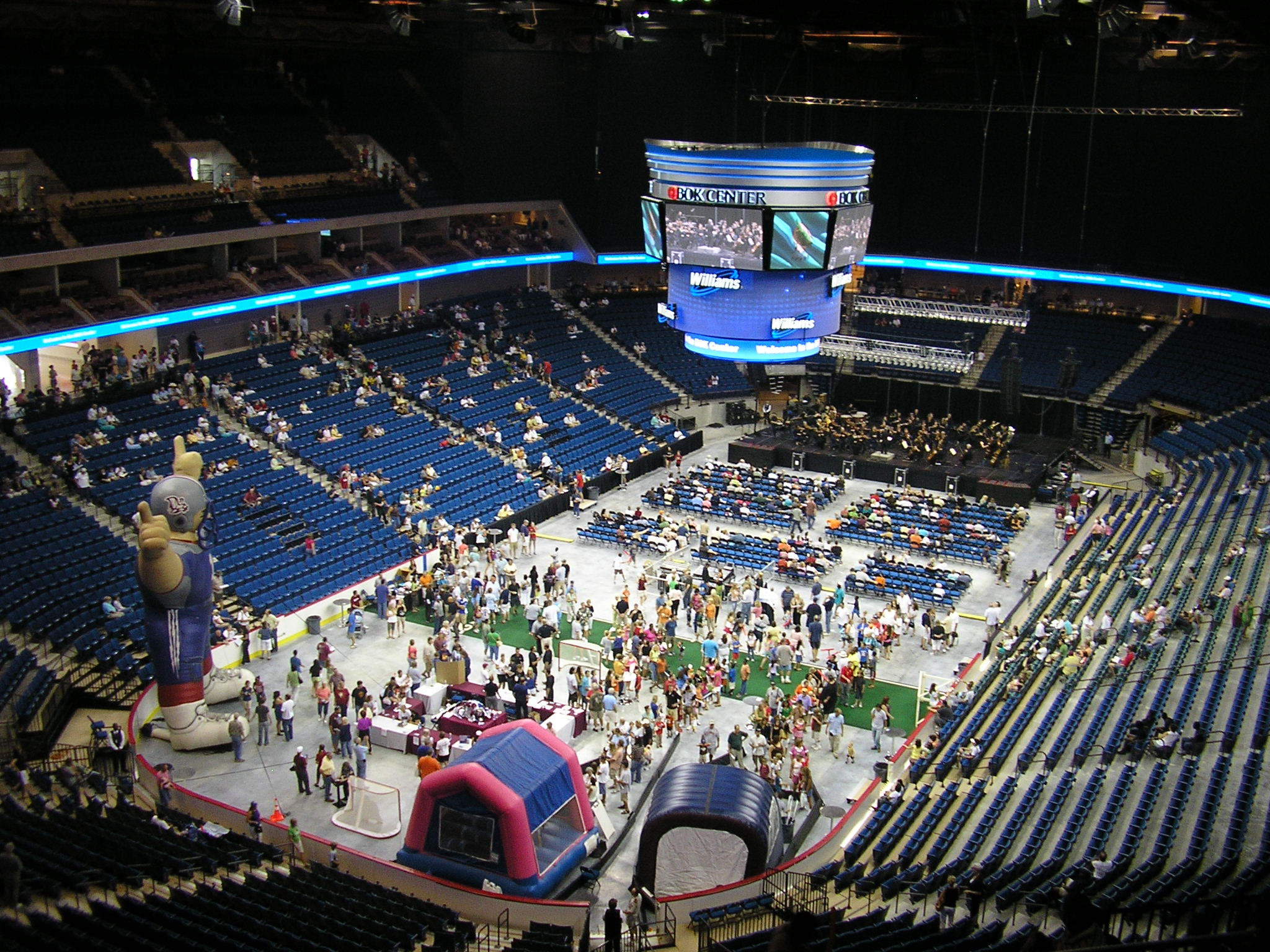
A public open house on August 30, 2008, served as the arena's opening event.

A campaign promise by former Tulsa mayor Bill LaFortune to hold a municipal planning conference was fulfilled within months of taking office in 2002. Although voters rejected tax packages for arenas in 1997 and 2000, a third plan for a downtown arena was the brainchild of the conference, along with dozens of other projects throughout Tulsa County, including a renovation of the nearby Tulsa Convention Center costing $42 million. Vision 2025, a tax initiative increasing sales taxes by six-tenths of a cent over 13 years, was approved by voters in September 2003. Pelli's design was released in September 2004 and construction began in August 2005.

Tulsa Vision Builders, a joint project of Tulsa-based Flintco and Manhattan Construction, was chosen to build the arena. Its original budget was deemed $141 million, but increases in the cost of structural steel, concrete, and labor due to Hurricane Katrina and a robust local economy pushed the cost to $178 million in 2006. An additional $18 million in private funding was used in miscellaneous upgrades, bringing the total cost of the arena to $196 million.

=== Event history ===
A ribbon-cutting ceremony involving Tulsa musicians Garth Brooks and Hanson took place on August 30, 2008. The arena's schedule of concerts and other events began on August 31 with a community choir hosted by Sam Harris.

The first announced concert was on September 6, 2008, and featured the Eagles. Since its grand opening, the BOK Center has hosted many big-name acts such as Paul McCartney, Rush, Billy Joel, Elton John, U2, Justin Timberlake, Garth Brooks, Britney Spears, Janet Jackson, Lady Gaga, Guns N' Roses, Kenny Chesney, Alan Jackson, Wynonna Judd, Bruce Springsteen, Twenty One Pilots, Zach Bryan, Tate McRae, AC/DC, Metallica, Nine Inch Nails, Celine Dion, Taylor Swift, Ariana Grande, One Direction, Brad Paisley, Dane Cook, Jonas Brothers, The Weeknd, Panic! At The Disco, Linkin Park, and Dua Lipa. The Eagles also scheduled a rare second performance at the BOK Center after their first concert sold out in 35 minutes. In late 2008, BOK Center General Manager John Bolton was given Venues Today's "Hall of Headlines" award after a poll of venue managers, owners, operators and bookers determined that Bolton had the highest level of success in booking high-quality performances among international venues in 2008.

On September 22, 2018, and September 21, 2019, the Dallas Stars hosted exhibition games at the venue against the Florida Panthers. Both games resulted in Panthers victories, 4–3 in overtime and 6-0 respectively. On September 27, 2022, the Stars returned there to host the Arizona Coyotes and won 4–3 in overtime.

On October 13, 2008, the NBA's Oklahoma City Thunder played the Houston Rockets in its first preseason game since leaving Seattle for Oklahoma and was the first major sporting event at the BOK Center. As of August 2008, the Thunder was seeking to play preseason games annually in Tulsa, although the number of games had not been determined. The next Thunder preseason game took place on October 3, 2017, against the Houston Rockets.

The BOK Center is home to one minor league professional sports team, the Tulsa Oilers ice hockey team of the ECHL. The arena was formerly the home of the Tulsa Talons Arena Football League team from 2009 (while they were in the af2) to 2011. Also, the Tulsa Shock of the Women's National Basketball Association, previously known as the Detroit Shock, played all their home games at the BOK Center from 2010 to 2015 before relocating to Dallas-Ft. Worth.

In March 2010, the Conference USA men's basketball tournament was held there. BOK Center later hosted second and third-round games in the NCAA Men's Division I Basketball Championship on March 18 and 20, 2011.

The Professional Bull Riders began hosting Built Ford Tough Series events at the BOK Center in 2009, after having previously occupied the Tulsa Convention Center.

On June 20, 2020, US President Donald Trump visited the BOK Center for a campaign rally. This was his first campaign rally in 110 days. The reported attendance turnout was seemingly "lower than expected", though it attracted considerable cable news and political network ratings.

=== Notable event facts ===
Paul McCartney performed on August 17, 2009. The event launched the "One Year Birthday" celebration of the venue. The stop in Tulsa was McCartney's first in Oklahoma since 2002 and was the only arena show of his 2009 Summer Tour. McCartney also played at the venue on May 29 and 30, 2013, as part of his Out There! Tour. His October 22, 2025 Got Back Tour performance at the center was the highest grossing music concert in the history of the venue to that date, bringing in over $4 million.

== Impact and reception ==
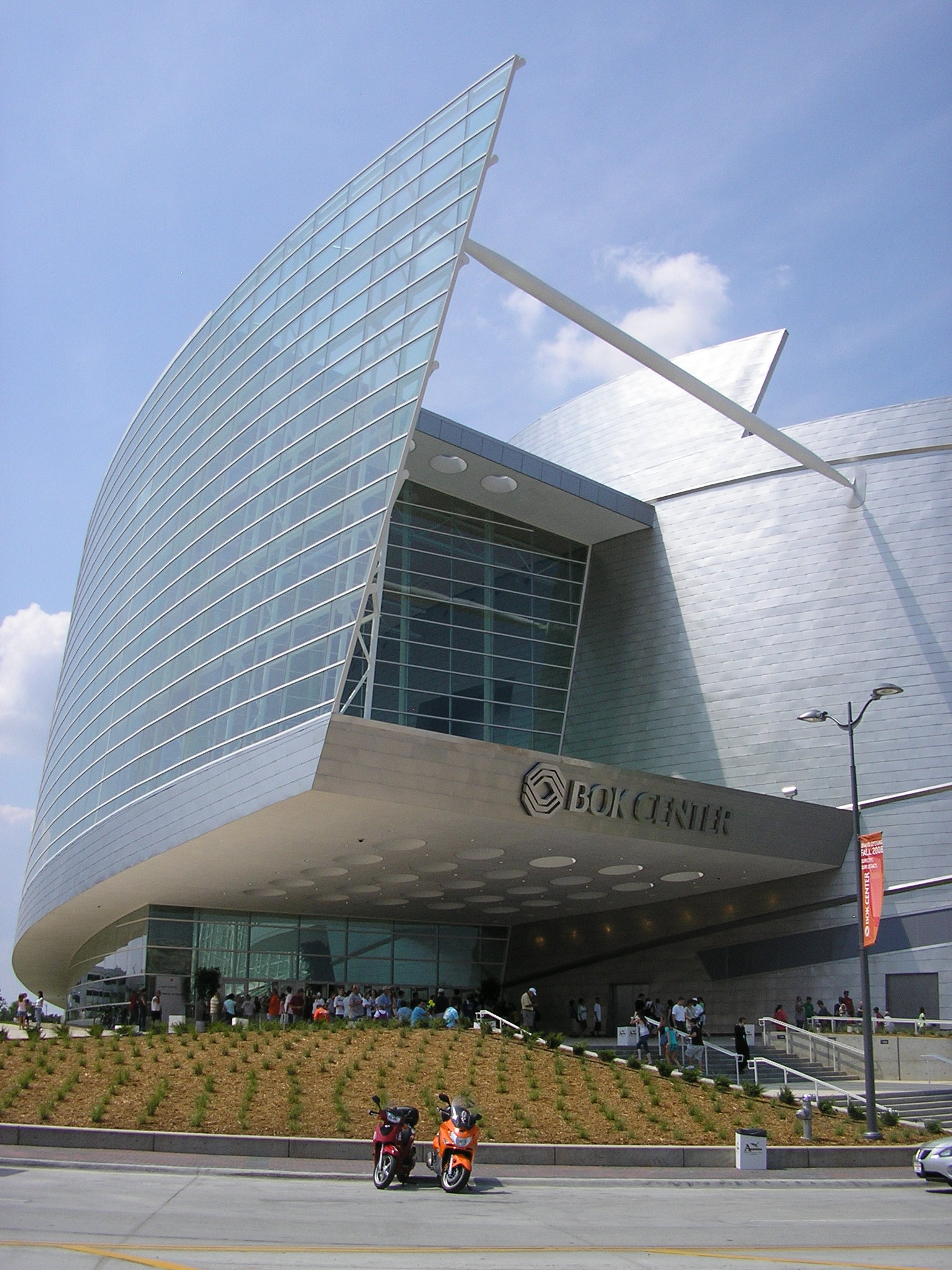
The BOK Center's main entrance

Tulsa's downtown was the site of projects anchored by BOK Center, including a $42 million renovation of the Tulsa Convention Center, a $20 million renovation of downtown streets, a $4 million renovation and expansion of a nearby parking garage, streetscape improvements, and art deco-style signs directing visitors to parking garages, public buildings, specialty districts, and entertainment venues. The arena was expected to host 148 major and minor events in its first year, which was anticipated to generate $1.5 million in tax revenue and $92 million in economic impact. SMG was expected to earn $6,553,250 in revenue, giving it a $285,498 annual profit. In its first four months of operation, BOK Center's ticket sales were nearly enough to reach Venues Today's top 20 worldwide rankings for total ticket sales in 2008 among venues seating 15,001-30,000. The arena reached $20 million in sales in 2008, and was projected to surpass at least $30 million in 2009, which would put it within the top 15 worldwide in sales according to the 2008 rankings.

The arena won Facilities Magazine's Prime Site Award in 2008, which is based on opinions from representatives in the site selection industry, booking agents, promoters, talent buyers, and special event planners, who judge based on location, functionality, technical capabilities, quality of staff, food and beverage, lighting, sound, and staging. The arena was also one of four venues nominated for Pollstar's 2008 "Best New Major Concert Venue" award, which is set to be decided in January 2009. In its first three months of operation, the facility was featured or set to be featured in at least four major venue publications, including Venues Today, which gave its 2008 "Hall of Headlines" award to BOK Center manager John Bolton after a poll of venue managers, owners, operators and bookers determined that Bolton had the highest level of success worldwide in booking high-quality performances in 2008. In late 2008, a survey of BOK Center visitors found that 96.7% felt the building's overall impression, staff, concessions, merchandise, and traffic flow were favorable.

The flowing design and acoustic properties of BOK Center have been praised by Tulsa Vision Builders, Tulsa city officials, and Garth Brooks. Officials from Flintco and Manhattan Construction have called the BOK Center one of the best architectural designs in their 100-year histories of building projects. The companies have worked on AT&T Stadium, NRG Stadium in Houston, Texas, Gallagher-Iba Arena at Oklahoma State University, Paycom Center in Oklahoma City, the FedEx Forum in Memphis, Tennessee, and stadium renovations at the University of Oklahoma and OSU, among other projects. City officials have praised Pelli for the design, and Brooks, who held a 2007 concert at Kansas City's new Sprint Center, said at the BOK Center's grand opening, "You guys have got (the Sprint Center) beat hands down. It houses as many people, yet it's warm and small. It's as beautiful and grand as any place I've played." Pelli reacted to the arena's completion by saying that it had taken a "life of its own" since he designed the building, but that the results were exciting and impressed him. He said the building has taken a form that pays tribute to Tulsa's art deco, the nearby Arkansas River, and the city's American Indian history, and anticipated that it would be a major catalyst for private development in Tulsa's downtown area.

== Transportation ==
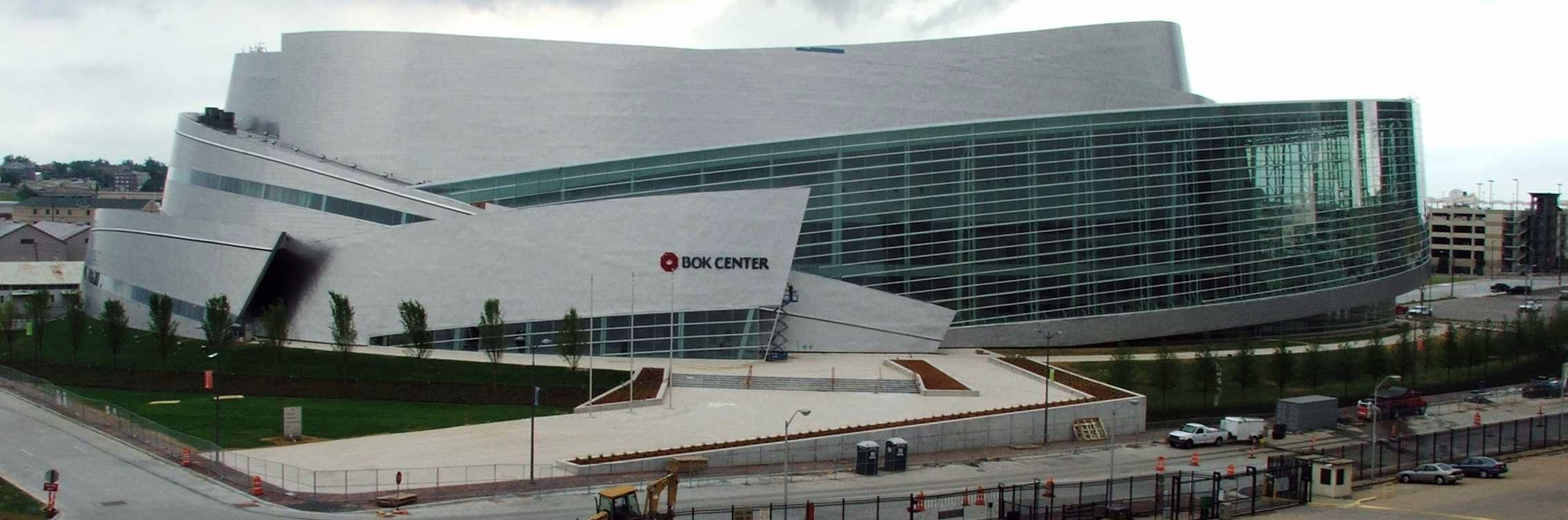
Streets bordering the BOK Center's back entrance are closed to traffic during events.

City officials estimate there are 12,000 parking spaces within a 10-minute walk of the BOK Center with a city-owned parking garage diagonally across the street from the arena. During major events, Tulsa Transit runs free shuttle bus services to and from the arena and downtown Tulsa. Through a program instituted by the Tulsa Convention and Visitors Bureau, 50 guides are stationed within dozens of blocks of the arena during major events to help with parking and provide general information about shuttle services, events, and downtown Tulsa. According to ParkingAccess, the BOK Center is located in the heart of downtown Tulsa, just a short walk from many hotels, restaurants, and businesses. There are several parking options available near the BOK Center, including: Paid parking lots: There are several paid parking lots located within a short walk of the BOK Center. These lots typically charge $10-$20 per event. Metered parking: There are also several metered parking spots located on the streets near the BOK Center. These spots typically cost $2 per hour. Valet parking: Valet parking is available at the BOK Center for a fee of $25 per event.

Events and tenants
Preceded by The Palace of Auburn Hills (as Detroit Shock)	Home of the Tulsa Shock; 2010–2015	Succeeded by College Park Center (as Dallas Wings)
Preceded by Tulsa Convention Center	Home of the Tulsa Talons; 2009–2011	Succeeded by Alamodome (San Antonio)
Preceded by Tulsa Convention Center	Home of the Tulsa Oilers; 2008–present	Succeeded by current
