= Union Station (Oklahoma City) =

Former train station in Oklahoma, US

Oklahoma City
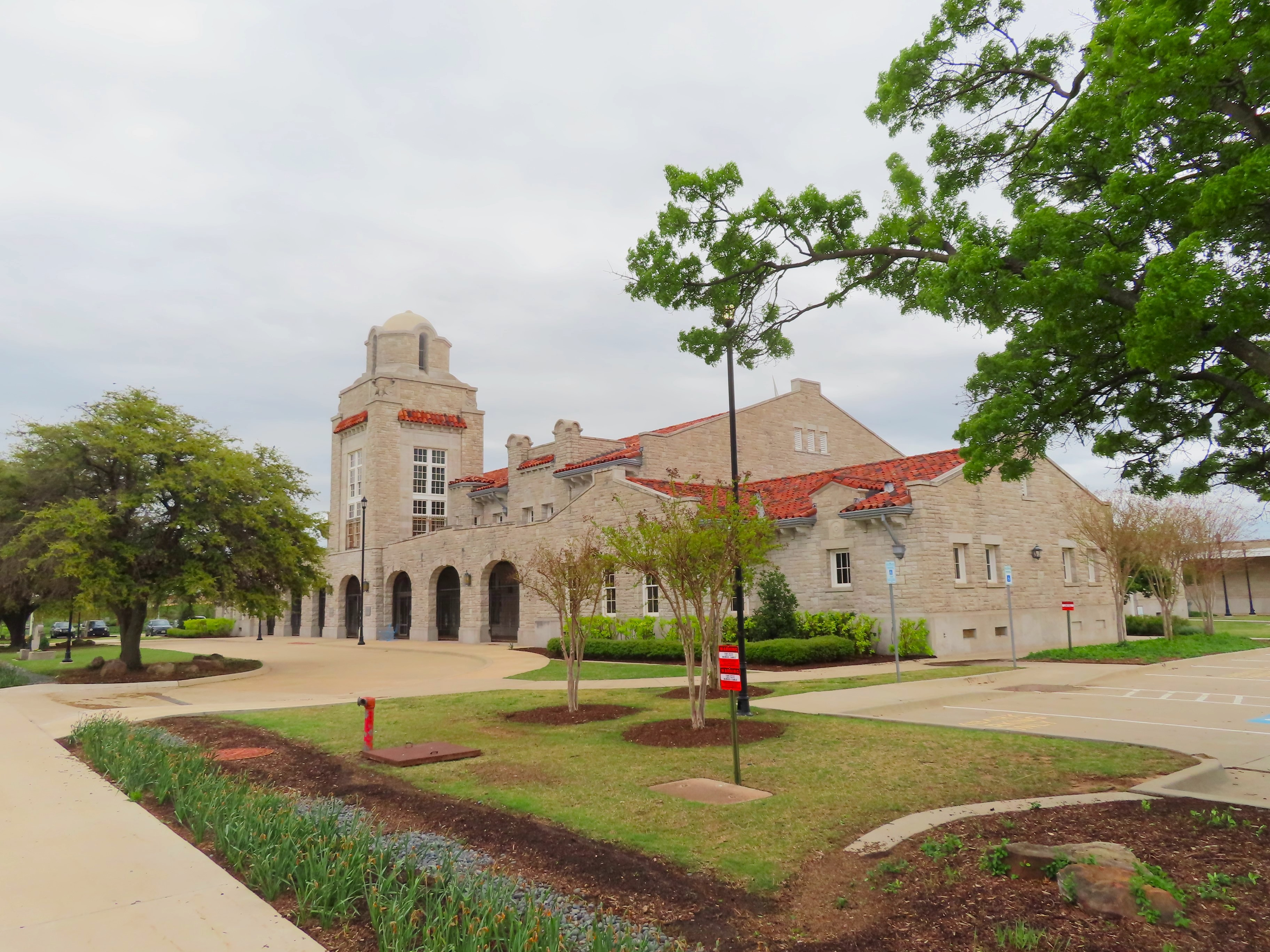

General information
- Location: 300 SW 7th St, Oklahoma City, Oklahoma
- Coordinates: 35°27′26″N 97°31′6″W
- System: Former Rock Island Line and Frisco passenger station
- Owner: City of Oklahoma City

History
- Opened: July 15, 1931
- Closed: 1967

Former services
Preceding station	Chicago, Rock Island and Pacific Railroad	Following station
Council toward Tucumcari	Tucumcari – Memphis	Dickson toward Memphis
Preceding station	St. Louis–San Francisco Railway	Following station
Terminus	Main Line	Spencer toward St. Louis
Terminus	Oklahoma City – Fort Scott	Spencer toward Fort Scott
Lillard Park toward Quanah	Quanah – Oklahoma City	Terminus
- Union Depot
- U.S. National Register of Historic Places
- Location within Oklahoma Location within the United States
- Built: 1930
- NRHP reference No.: 78002254
- Added to NRHP: May 16, 1978
Location

Oklahoma City Union Depot is a building in Oklahoma City, Oklahoma that served as a "union station" from 1931 until 1967. It was listed on the National Register of Historic Places in 1979. It now houses the offices of the Scissortail Park Foundation.

== History ==
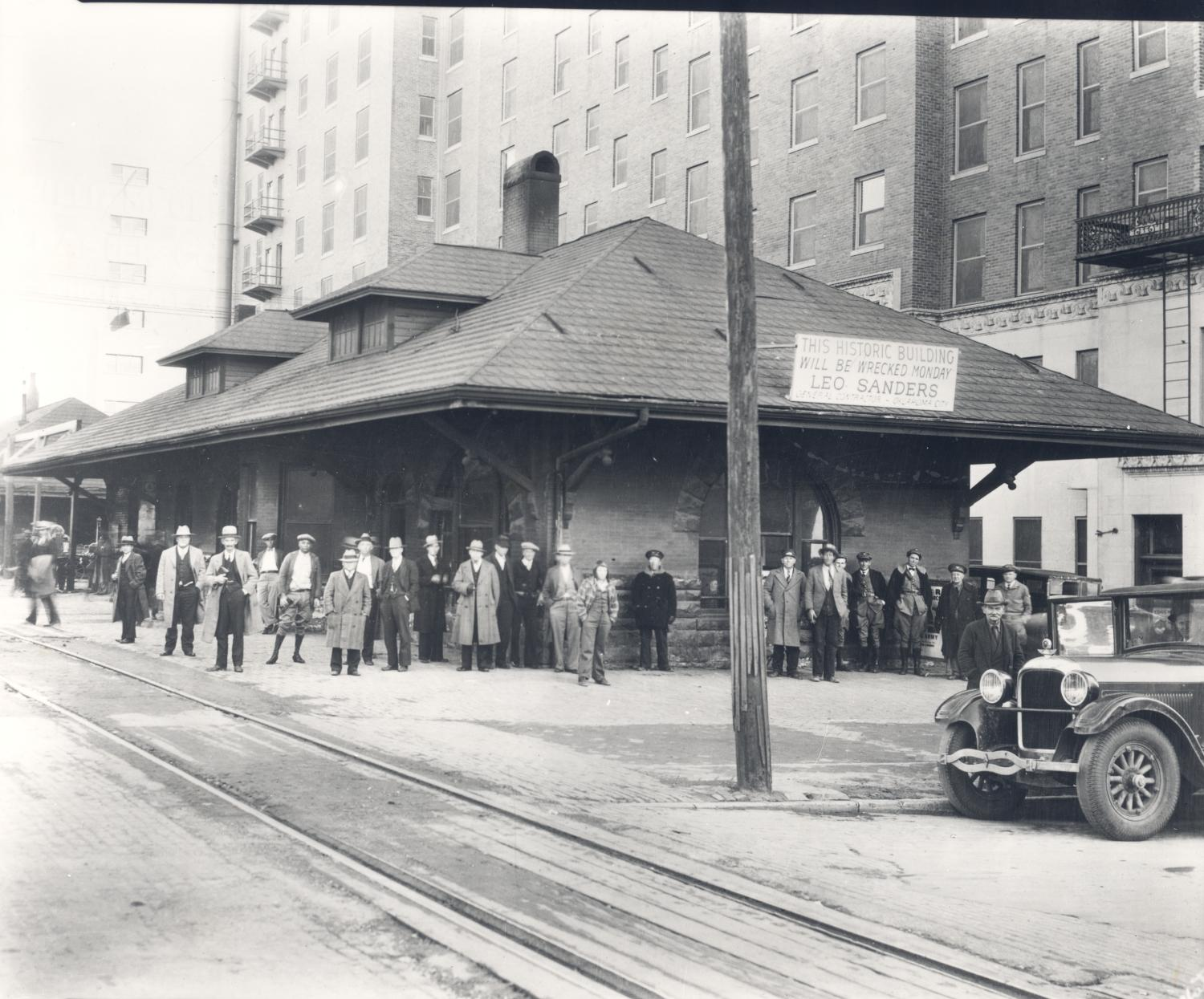
Rock Island Depot on Broadway, demolished in 1930. The Skirvin Hilton Hotel is visible behind the depot.

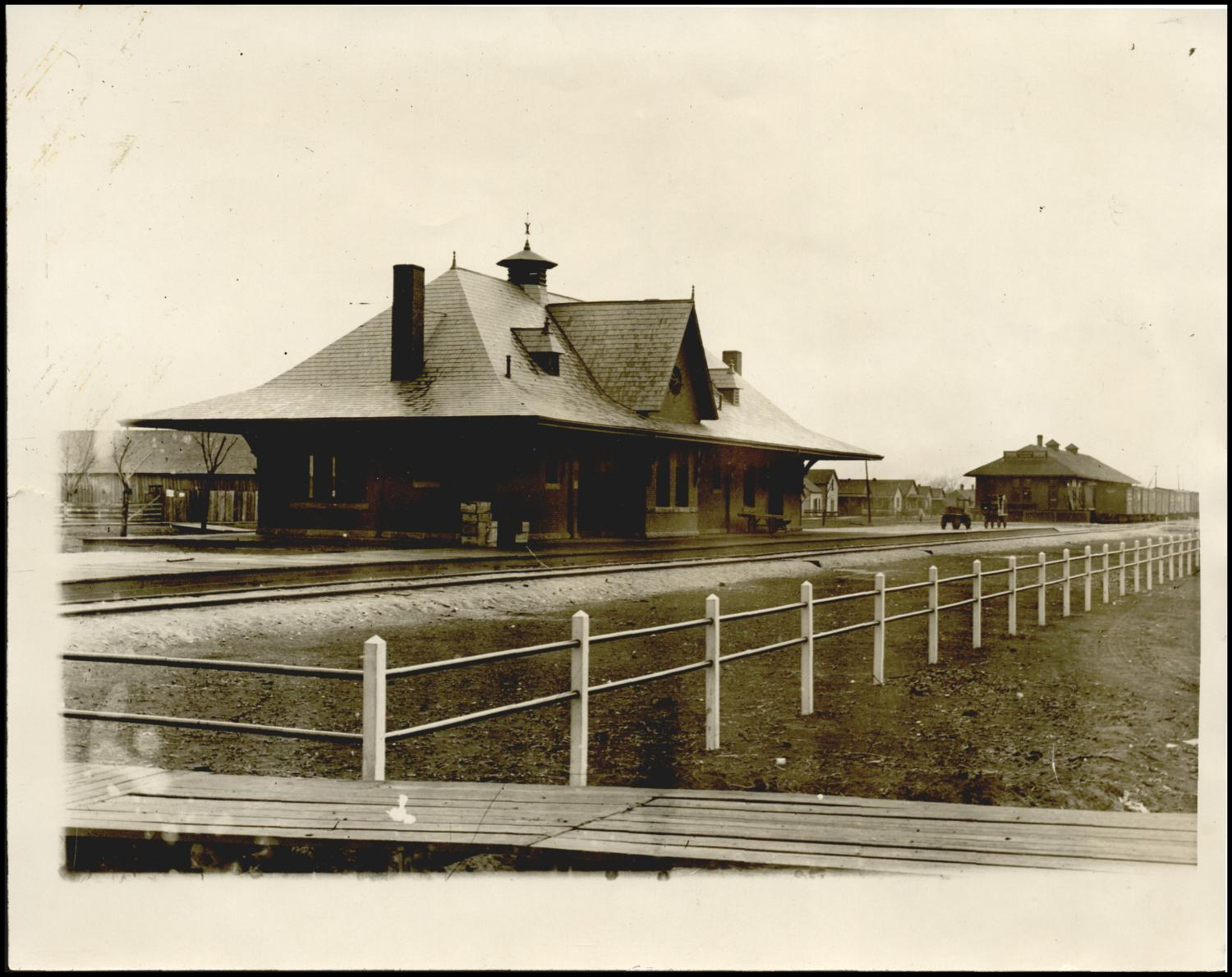
Frisco Depot in downtown Oklahoma City. Oklahoma County Courthouse currently occupies the site.

Oklahoma City Union Station was built as part of a plan to move surface rail lines and passenger stations of the Rock Island and Frisco railroads out of downtown Oklahoma City. Grade-separating the tracks of the Santa Fe was also part of the plan. Bonds were issued by the city government to repurchase the rights of way of the Frisco and Rock Island and to pay for new civic buildings on the vacated land.

Prior to the construction of Union Station, the Rock Island had its depot on North Broadway between West 1st and West 2nd Streets. The Frisco had its passenger facilities a few blocks to the west between West Main and West 1st Streets fronting on North Hudson Street.

The previous stations were last used on November 30, 1930, with passenger traffic being moved to a temporary station at the foot of South Hudson Street the next day. The Santa Fe Depot remained in use, and the Missouri-Kansas-Texas Railroad also continued using its own station.

The depot closed to the public in 1967 following the discontinuance of the last passenger trains serving Oklahoma City. Frisco passenger train service ended in May 1967 and Rock Island passenger train service ended in November 1967.

== Architecture and station facilities ==
The terminal building, with 55,000 sq ft (5,100 m^{2}) on its main floor, is designed in the California Spanish Mission Revival style. Racial segregation was incorporated into the design of the building and thus, there are two waiting rooms, the larger of which was for white people only and the other for colored people. The structure included many other features such as small courtyards and alcoves with fountains and gardens surrounding the station building.

Passengers accessed the original 12-track station through tunnels via a ramp from the depot's waiting room. Mail and express shipments were also routed under the station to the surface passenger platforms. Traffic on Hudson and Harvey streets met the trains "at grade," enabling passenger access and exchange of mail and express freight between trucks and trains. Traffic on Robinson and Walker streets used underpasses built as part of the station complex. Freight warehouses and material handling areas were located behind the passenger facilities.

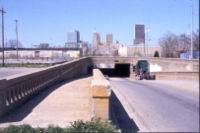
Robinson Street underpass, Union Station Rail Yard

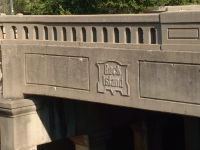
Robinson Street underpass, Union Station Rail Yard Rock Island Railroad Logo

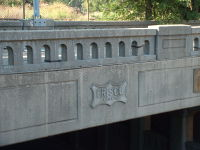
Robinson Street underpass, Union Station Rail Yard Frisco Railroad Logo

== Tenant railroads ==
Union Station was served by two different railroads.

- The Rock Island, whose east-west route from Memphis to Tucumcari hosted several passenger trains, including:
  - the Choctaw Rocket (Memphis – Amarillo) and unnamed local service (Memphis – Tucumcari)
- The Frisco railroad operated trains such as the Meteor (St. Louis – Springfield, Tulsa – Oklahoma City), the Firefly (Kansas City – Oklahoma City) and the Will Rogers (St. Louis – Springfield, Tulsa – Oklahoma City) all through Tulsa to the northeast.

Other Frisco trains operated between Oklahoma City Quanah, Texas via Lawton.

These lines last saw passenger service in the 1960s with many sections saved from abandonment by the Oklahoma Department of Transportation and operated by short-line railroads.

== Controversy ==
In the 1980s the facility was purchased by the city of Oklahoma City to become a multimodal transportation center at a cost of $1.8 million, with $1.2 million being a grant from the Federal Transit Administration. As part the I-40 Crosstown Realignment, the former yard tracks were replaced by the new highway. Space for two rail tracks in the station has been preserved as has the depot itself.

This realignment was unsuccessfully challenged by several organizations (OnTrac, North American Transportation Institute, Common Cause). This realignment will add an additional 10 lanes of road through downtown Oklahoma City while the current corridor becomes an at-grade boulevard.

On June 5, 2008, the Surface Transportation Board stated that BNSF Railway falsified an application and ruled against the realignment. BNSF filed a petition to bypass hearings and debate altogether to force the realignment.
