= D.C. Minner =

Coordinates: 35.52131°N 95.48752°W

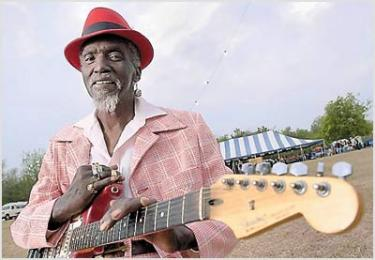
- D.C. Minner at his Dusk 'til Dawn Blues Festival.

Background information
- Born: January 28, 1935, Rentiesville, Oklahoma, United States
- Died: May 6, 2008 (aged 73) Oklahoma, United States
- Genres: Blues, blues-rock
- Occupations: Musician, singer-songwriter
- Instruments: Guitar, vocals, bass guitar
- Years active: 1950–2008
- Website: The Official D.C. Minner Site

D.C. Minner (January 28, 1935 – May 6, 2008) was an American blues musician, teacher, and philosopher who was known for sharing music with children and adults alike throughout Oklahoma and beyond.

Born in Rentiesville, Oklahoma, he performed with O. V. Wright, Freddie King, Chuck Berry, Eddie Floyd and Bo Diddley, and was inducted into the Oklahoma Jazz Hall of Fame in 1999. He owned the 'Down Home Blues Club' in Rentiesville, where he and his wife Selby Minner held a long-running annual blues festival, the 'Dusk 'til Dawn Blues Festival'. The couple had won an international KBA from the Blues Foundation in Memphis for their BITS (Blues in the Schools) work with children.

== History ==
Date	Events
1950-60s	Played with Larry Johnson and the NEW BREED and other musical artists.
1970	switched from bass to guitar and moved north to Berkeley.
1976	formed BLUES ON THE MOVE.
1979	D.C. and Selby married
1990	BLUES ON THE MOVE was added to the OK Arts Council Rosters
1991	Founded Dusk 'til Dawn Blues Festival.
1999	D.C. and Selby Minner received an international KBA from the Handy People (Blues Foundation in Memphis) for their BITS (Blues in the Schools) work with school children.
1999	Inducted into the OK Jazz Hall of Fame.
1999	street next to the Blues Club named after him.
2003	inducted into the OK Music Hall of Fame and (by popular vote) the Payne County Hall of Fame.

== Other sources ==
- Chancellor, Jennifer (August 3, 2007). "Rentiesville real". Tulsa World.
- Thomas, John D (February 8, 2004). "Towns Born of Struggle and Hope". New York Times.
- "Bluesman D.C. Minner dies". Tulsa World. May 8, 2008.
- "D. C. Minner". Associated Press (Legacy.com). May 2008.
