= Tommy Crook =

American guitarist (1944–2026)

- Born: Thomas Paul Crook; February 16, 1944; Tulsa, Oklahoma, U.S.
- Died: February 4, 2026 (aged 81)
- Genres: Bluegrass, Country music, Jazz
- Occupation: Musician
- Instrument: Guitar

Thomas Paul Crook (February 16, 1944 – February 4, 2026) was an American guitarist who lived in Tulsa, Oklahoma. He was inducted into the Oklahoma Music Hall of Fame in 2007.

== Background ==
Crook was born in Tulsa, Oklahoma, on February 16, 1944. He began playing guitar at the age of four and by the age ten had started appearing on local television in Tulsa. He was the father of three children: Aimee L. Crook (born 1964), Thomas H. Crook (born 1966) and Kaycie Crook (born 1975). Crook became a grandfather in January 1997.

Crook died on February 4, 2026, at the age of 81.

== Professional career ==
Crook played fingerstyle. He replaced the lower two strings on his Gibson switchmaster with bass strings, allowing him to create the impression of playing bass and guitar simultaneously.

He played with many artists including J.J. Cale, Chet Atkins, Merle Haggard, and Leon Russell.

== Discography ==
- Mr. Guitar and Mr. Drums, 1968.
- Tommy Crook, 1989.
- World of Fingerstyle Jazz Guitar, Release Date: September 29, 2003, Format: DVD-Video.
- 110° In The Shade—Guitar Duets with Anthony Weller, 2002
- Night and Day- Tommy Crook and Shelby Eicher, 1991, Format: cassette
- Tommy Crook Plays Unforgettable and Other Favorites, 2004. Format CD

== Sources ==
- Tommy Crook & Anthony Weller "110° In The Shade: Guitar Duets", 2002, Ton Tom Records

The liner notes to this CD state that Tommy recorded some 75 solo tunes, but these have never been published.
