= Vision 2025 =

Tax proposition for economic development in Tulsa, Oklahoma

Vision 2025 was a series of four propositions to increase Tulsa County's sales tax rate by $0.01 in order to fund capital improvements and provide economic development incentives.

Two prior proposals, in 1997 and 2000, were rejected by Tulsa County voters. However, all four components of Vision 2025 were approved by voters in a September 9, 2003 election.

Proposition 1 was never implemented; as such, the overall sales tax increase was only $0.006.

== Proposition 1 ==
The goal of Proposition 1 was to attract the assembly plant for the Boeing 787 to Tulsa. Proposition 1 would have offered up to $350 million in incentives, and would have raised sales taxes by $0.004.

However, in December 2003 Boeing chose Everett, Washington as the site for Boeing 787 assembly. Therefore, this part of the sales tax increase never went into effect.

== Proposition 2 ==
The goal of Proposition 2 was to convince American Airlines (Tulsa's largest employer) to keep its flagship maintenance facility in Tulsa (during a rough period in the airline industry AA was considering closing one of its three maintenance facilities: Fort Worth, Kansas City, and Tulsa). Proposition 2 offered $22.3 Million in incentives and resulted in a $0.00025 sales tax increase.

AA later decided to close its Kansas City facility, keeping the Tulsa facility open.

== Proposition 3 ==
The largest of the four Propositions (at $350.3 Million), Proposition 3 included enhancements to various educational institutions in the Tulsa area (OU-Tulsa, OSU-Tulsa, Langston-Tulsa, NSU-Broken Arrow, and Tulsa Community College). Proposition 3 also provided funds for elementary and secondary education for the various Tulsa County school districts.

In addition to educational funding, Proposition 3 also provided funding for a new Morton Health Clinic, renovation of the Tulsa Convention Center, and construction of the BOK Center.

The passage of Proposition 3 resulted in a $0.004 increase in the sales tax.

== Proposition 4 ==
Proposition 4 allocated $157.4 Million for various county infrastructure projects (parks, area attractions, river improvements, community centers, and improved county roads). Passage resulted in a $0.00175 increase in the sales tax.

== 2016 Extension ==
The 2003 version of Vision 2025 raised $662 million through December 2015, and expired December 31, 2016. An election was scheduled for April 5, 2016 to extend the sales tax rate, promising not to exceed the then-current rate of 8.517 percent.

There are three major components to the proposed extension:

- Permanent funding for public safety. Would fund hiring 160 police officers and 65 firefighters over 15-year period.
- Permanent funding for public transportation and streets. Would fund building a transit hub, expand bus routes, create a downtown route and expand evening and weekend service, more street repairs.
- Economic development. Fund a variety of projects including more improvements along Arkansas River, expanding Gilcrease Museum, improve Cox Business Center, airport improvements, and provide housing incentives to help attract and retain school teachers.

The Tulsa City Council reported that voters approved all three components of the Vision Tulsa extension on April 5, 2016.
