= Evelyn LaRue Pittman =

American composer and choral director (1910–1992)

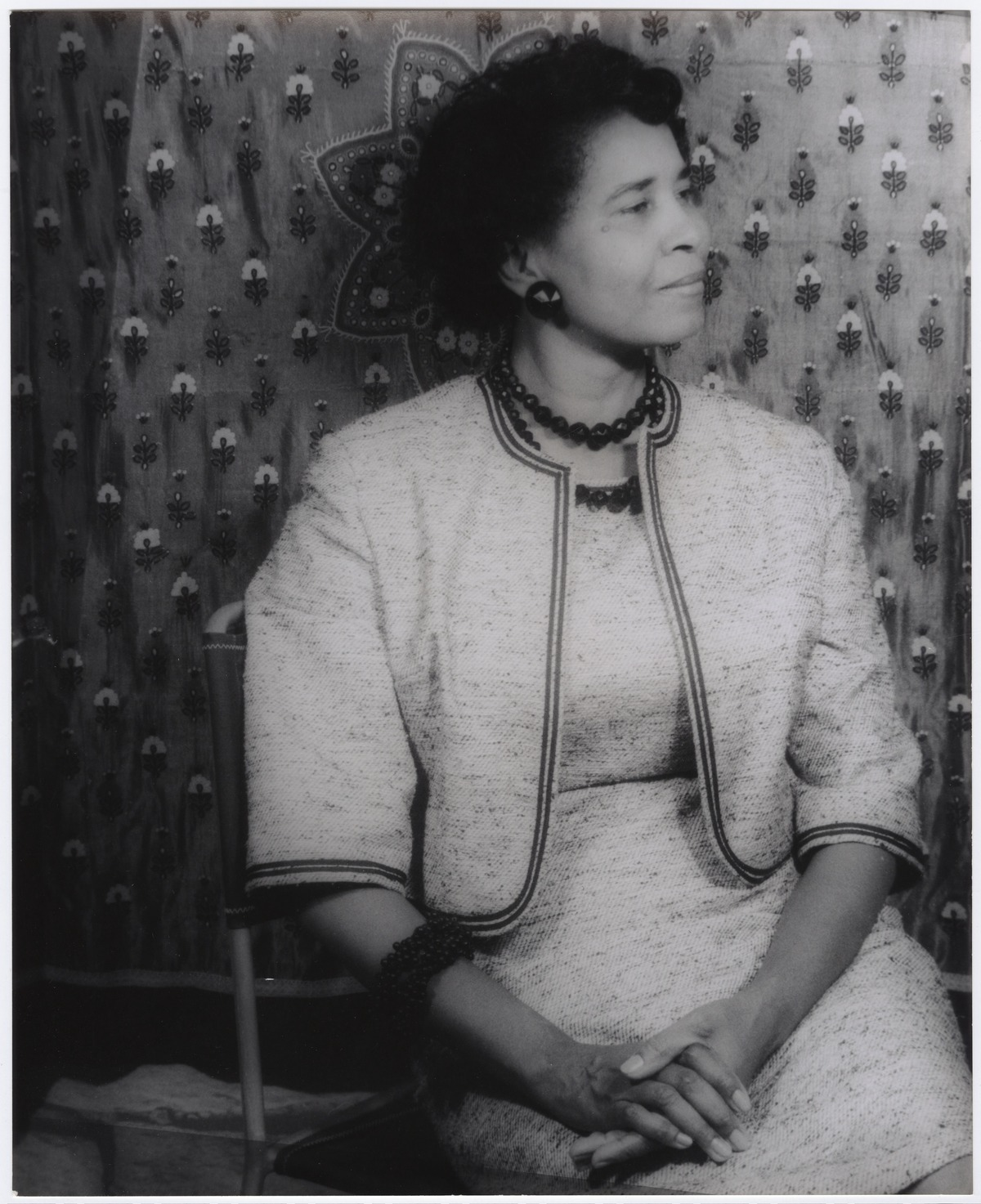
- Photograph of Evelyn LaRue Pittman taken by Carl Van Vechten
- Born: January 6, 1910; McAlester, Oklahoma
- Died: December 1992 (aged 82)
- Occupations: Composer; choral director; music educator

Evelyn LaRue Pittman (January 6, 1910 – December 1992) was an American composer, choral director and music educator.

== Life and career ==
=== Early life ===
Evelyn LaRue Pittman was born on January 6, 1910 in McAlester, Oklahoma. Her interest in music began at a young age, and she began composing songs in the first grade. Her musical interest continued into high school, where she participated in school musicals and sang in their "well-known choir", of which she was the first Black member.

=== Later life ===
Pittman attended public school in Oklahoma City, and later attended Spelman College and Oklahoma University, where she received her master's degree. While in school, Pittman studied violin, trombone, and harmony. She also received a life certificate from Langston University to teach music and social studies in the state of Oklahoma. In New York, Pittman received a permanent certificate from Columbia University to teach public school music on any level in the New York Education Department, and ended up teaching in the Greenburgh School District. Pittman then studied composition at the Juilliard School of Music and was likely the first black Oklahoman to study at the school. She then collaborated with Zelia Breaux on operettas and other community programs. Pittman has also studied under famed composer Nadia Boulanger in Paris and Fontainebleau, France, upon the recommendation of her composition teacher, Harrison Kerr of the University of Oklahoma, and Robert Ward at the Juilliard School of Music.

== Works ==
"Rich Heritage", written by Pittman, was published in 1944 and updated in 1968. It is a book for children filled with biographical sketches and songs about famous Americans. She was known for her choral arrangements of spirituals, and her major works were musical dramas. Her folk opera, Cousin Esther was performed in Paris in 1957.

Pittman has also done many arrangements of spirituals and choral works that show the influence of black church music in particular. Some of her published works are “Any How,” “Rock-a-mah Soul,” “Sit Down Servant,” "Joshua,” “Nobody Knows the Trouble I See,” and “Tramping”.

=== Freedom Child ===
Frustrated by the 1968 assassination of Martin Luther King Jr., Pittman began to write. Two years later, Pittman, a music teacher at Woodlands High School in Hartsdale, New York, produced and directed Freedom Child, a musical drama about King, performed by her Woodlands students. After Pittman and her students received rave reviews in New York, they took the musical on the road. The group traveled throughout the state of New York and eventually took Freedom Child to 11 different countries.

Pittman made a videotape of Freedom Child for school children and her Oklahoma friends. "It's something I've always wanted to do. Now children and other Oklahomans who didn't have the opportunity to see Martin Luther King will be able to learn about him," she said. "I wrote the musical because I had a genuine interest in King. When he marched on Washington, D.C., I decided to fly down to join the 250,000 people who gathered. I knew I couldn't face my students if I didn't go."

Pittman, who wrote the story, the music and the lyrics for Freedom Child, said it took her two years to write the initial production. A perfectionist who continues to work on the musical drama, Pittman said, "If I don't stop writing soon, it will never be finished. Since the first performance in 1971, Pittman has deleted three songs and added three new songs to the musical. She said the songs represent all types of music because King's mother, Alberta, said her son liked all kinds of music. Pittman said King's mother invited her to bring her students to Atlanta to perform the musical at the Ebenezer Baptist Church. She said King's father, the Rev. Martin Luther King Sr., originally was anxious about watching the musical but later said it was the most authentic work he had seen on the subject.
