= Firefly (train) =

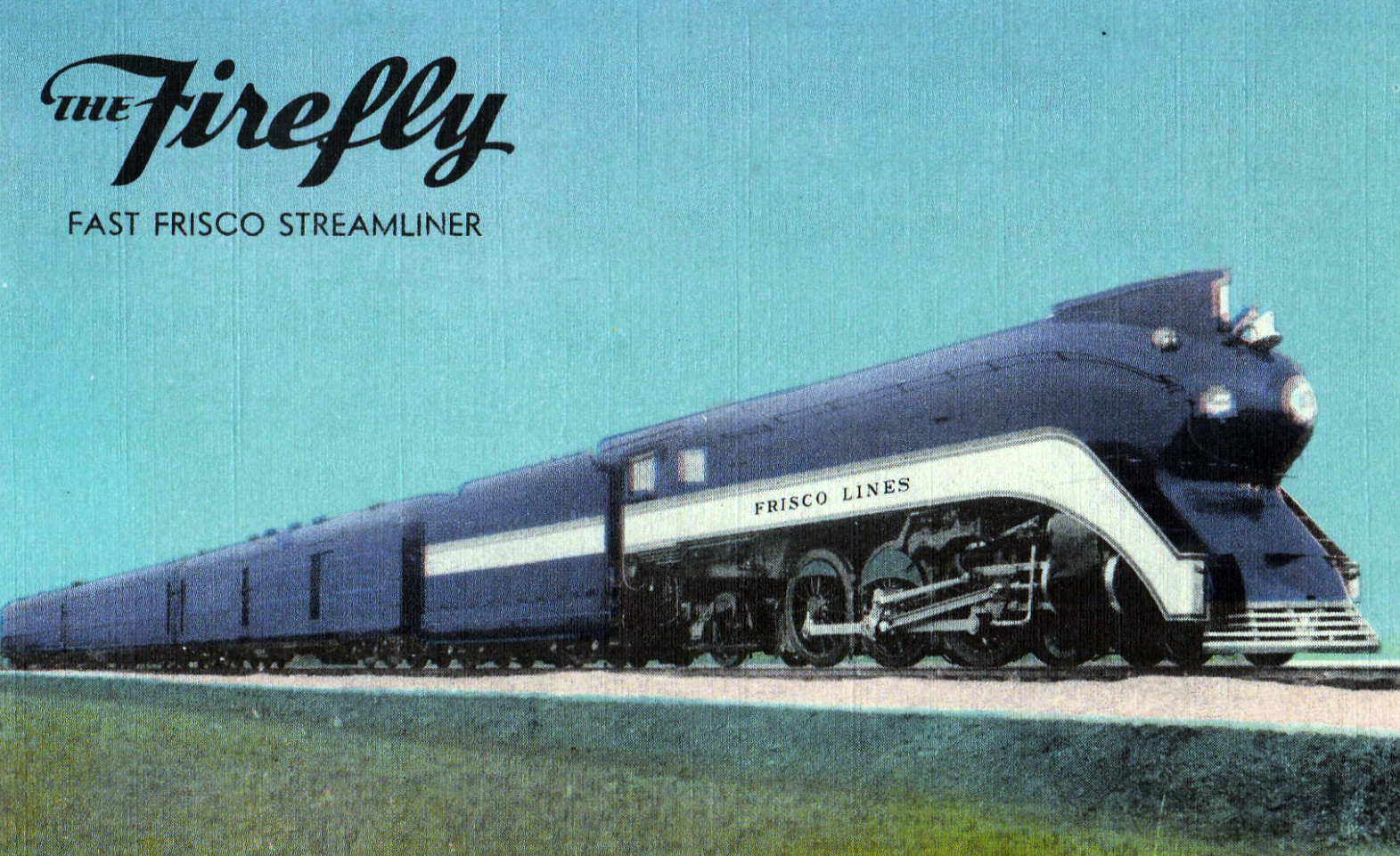
- The steam-powered streamliner Firefly.

Overview
- First service: March 29, 1940
- Last service: May 22, 1960
- Former operator: St. Louis – San Francisco Railway

Route
- Termini: Kansas City, Missouri; Tulsa, Oklahoma at peak: Oklahoma City, Oklahoma
- Distance travelled: 261.7 miles (421.2 km) (Kansas City-Tulsa, 1959)
- Train numbers: 107-117 (southwest-bound), 108-118 (northeast-bound)

On-board services
- Seating arrangements: Reclining chair car
- Catering facilities: Chair-lounge-buffet car (1959)

The Firefly was a streamlined passenger train operated by the St. Louis – San Francisco Railway (the "Frisco"). At various times, it served St Louis, Missouri, Tulsa and Oklahoma City, Oklahoma, Kansas City, Missouri, and Fort Scott, Kansas. It made its maiden run on March 29, 1940, and ended May 22, 1960. It was Frisco’s first streamliner, and the first streamliner to be built in the southwest.

== History ==
The Firefly's first regular run was March 29, 1940 over the Kansas City—Tulsa—Oklahoma City route. It was intended to compete with the Santa Fe, which had expanded its diesel streamliner service The Chicagoan/Kansas Cityan/Tulsan to serve Tulsa and Oklahoma City. Despite utilizing elderly steam locomotives, the Firefly ran competitive times, running five hours and five minutes to Tulsa and seven hours and fifteen minutes to Oklahoma City. The Frisco provided convenient daylight service, while the Santa Fe, operating through-service to and from Chicago (a city the Frisco did not serve), arrived at and left from Oklahoma City in the wee hours of the morning. The Firefly proved popular enough to overwhelm its three-car consists, and mismatched conventional cars were often used to enlarge capacity during World War II.

In the 1950s the train's itinerary was shortened to Kansas City-Tulsa. The train's last run, between Fort Scott and Tulsa, took place on May 22, 1960; between Fort Scott and Kansas City it ran combined with the Sunnyland. The Firefly was the last Frisco train serving the Tulsa-Fort Scott route.

== Equipment ==
The Frisco decided to fit its steam locomotives with a cowling, described as a torpedo-type jacket giving it the appearance of a bullet-like projectile traveling down the track. The engines were converted by Frisco itself in Springfield, with the first one, No. 1026, being completed in May 1938. The engine was not new; it had originally been built by the Baldwin Locomotive Works in 1910 as an ordinary 4-6-2 “Pacific”. Two other engines, Nos. 1018 and 1031, both also Baldwin 4-6-2’s from 1910, were later converted for the Firefly service as well. The driving wheels were enlarged from 69" to 73" by means of extremely thick driver tires, for greater speed. Frisco remanufactured the cars too, eventually collecting a fleet of eighty-nine passenger cars painted in the matching blue and gray livery.

Two consists were necessary to protect the Firefly's schedule; each was composed of refurbished heavyweight cars. A standard consist included a baggage-mail coach (16 seats), coach (60 seats), and cafe-parlor car.

In later years, the run was powered by various of the road's EMD E-8A locomotives named for racehorses, or by EMD FP-7 locomotives.
