= Flash Terry =

American guitarist and singer

Flash Terry (June 17, 1934 – March 18, 2004) was an American guitarist and singer. Terry was notably instrumental in the birth of blues and blues rock in the state of Oklahoma.

He was born Verbie Gene Terry in Inola, Oklahoma, United States. Terry was inducted into the Oklahoma Hall of Fame in 1994. He most notably recorded "Enough Troubles of My Own". He was the older brother of fellow musician Wiley Terry, who co-wrote and sang the 1964 hit, "Follow the Leader".

In the wake of his death, at the age of 69, following a stroke in Tulsa, Oklahoma, in March 2004, a band member Kevin Phariss, rebuilt the group.

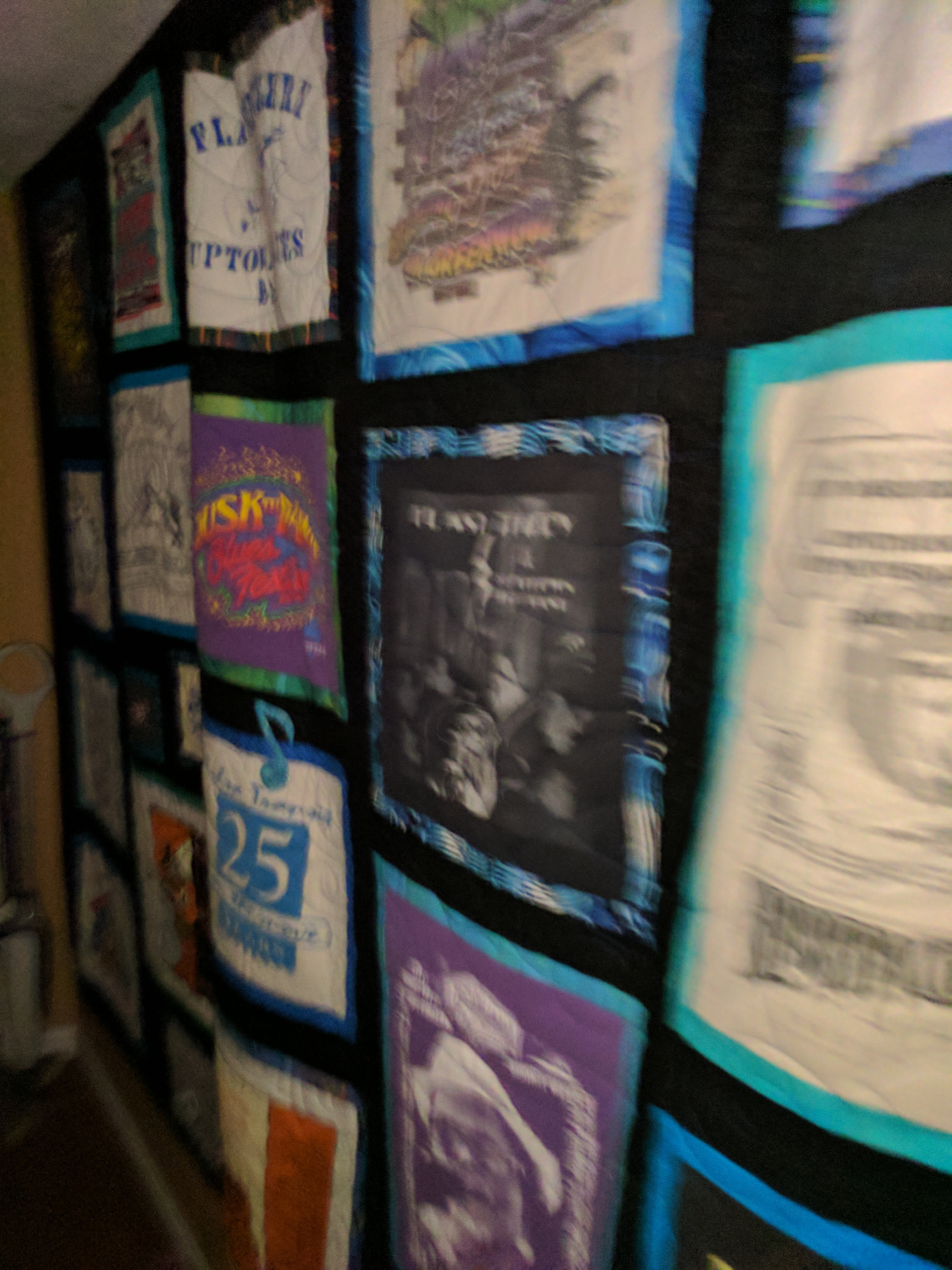
Quilt made by Constance Spotts with T-shirts actually worn by Flash Terry for his son Dustin Morris

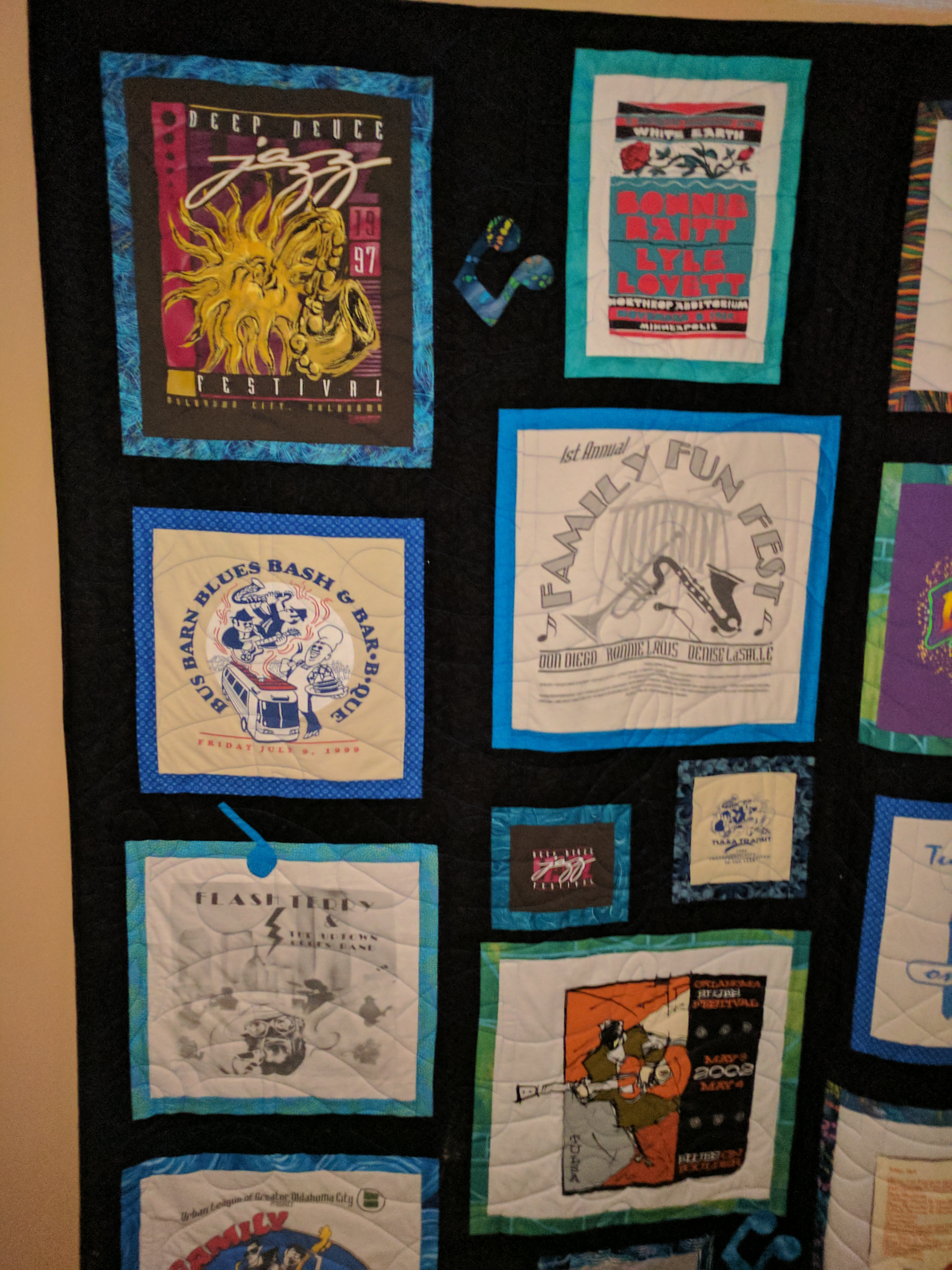
Quilt made by Constance Spotts with T-shirts actually worn by Flash Terry for his son Dustin Morris
