= Sgt. Pepper's Lonely Hearts Club Band =

1967 studio album by the Beatles

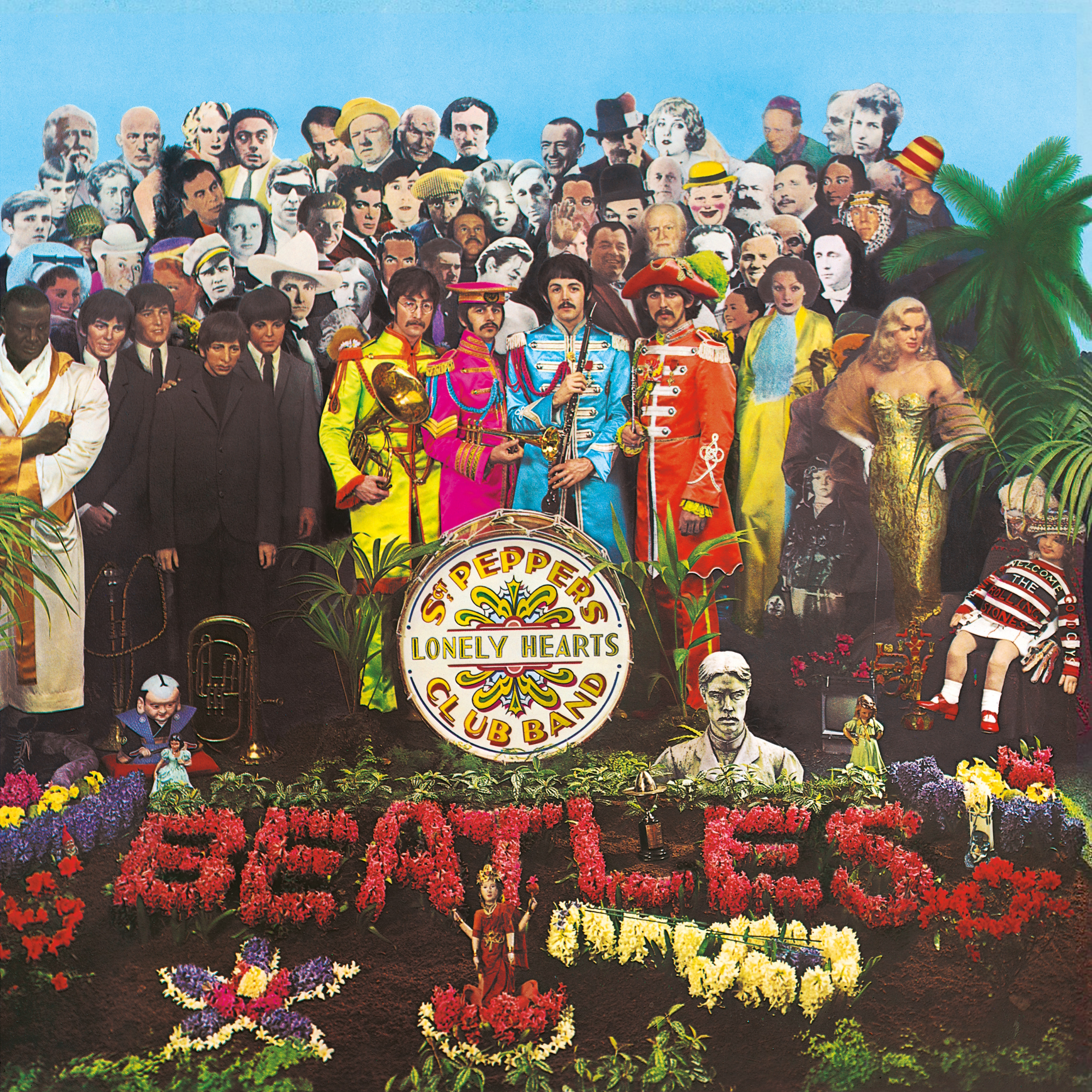

Studio album by the Beatles
- Released: 26 May 1967
- Recorded: 6 December 1966 – 21 April 1967
- Studios: EMI and Regent Sound, London
- Genres: Rock; pop; psychedelia; art rock
- Length: 39:36
- Labels: Parlophone; Capitol
- Producer: George Martin

The Beatles chronology
A Collection of Beatles Oldies (1966)	Sgt. Pepper's Lonely Hearts Club Band (1967)	The Beatles (1968)

The Beatles North American chronology
Revolver (1966)	Sgt. Pepper's Lonely Hearts Club Band (1967)	Magical Mystery Tour (1967)

Sgt. Pepper's Lonely Hearts Club Band is the eighth studio album by the English rock band the Beatles. Released in the UK on 26 May 1967, (Note: According to author Allen J. Wiener, the album's intended release date of 1 June has been "traditionally observed" over the ensuing decades, yet the true release date was 26 May.) Sgt. Pepper is regarded by musicologists as an early concept album that advanced the roles of sound composition, extended form, psychedelic imagery, record sleeves, and the producer in popular music. The album had an immediate cross-generational impact and was associated with numerous touchstones of the era's youth culture, such as fashion, drugs, mysticism, and a sense of optimism and empowerment. Critics lauded the album for its innovations in songwriting, production and graphic design, for bridging a cultural divide between popular music and high art, and for reflecting the interests of contemporary youth and the counterculture.

At the end of August 1966, the Beatles had permanently retired from touring and pursued individual interests for the next three months. During a return flight to London in November, Paul McCartney had an idea for a song involving an Edwardian military band, forming the impetus of the Sgt. Pepper concept. For this project, they continued the technological experimentation marked by their previous album, Revolver (1966), this time without an absolute deadline for completion. Sessions began on 24 November at EMI Studios with compositions inspired by the Beatles' youth, but after pressure from EMI, the songs "Strawberry Fields Forever" and "Penny Lane" were released as a double A-side single in February 1967 and left off the LP. The album was then loosely conceptualised as a performance by the fictional Sgt. Pepper band, an idea that was conceived after the recording of the title track.

A landmark work of British psychedelia, Sgt. Pepper is considered one of the first art rock LPs and a progenitor to progressive rock. It incorporates a range of stylistic influences, including vaudeville, circus, music hall, avant-garde, and Western and Indian classical music. With assistance from producer George Martin and engineer Geoff Emerick, many of the recordings were coloured with sound effects and tape manipulation, as exemplified on "Lucy in the Sky with Diamonds", "Being for the Benefit of Mr. Kite!" and "A Day in the Life". Recording was completed on 21 April. The cover, which depicts the Beatles posing in front of a tableau of celebrities and historical figures, was designed by the pop artists Peter Blake and Jann Haworth.

Sgt. Pepper's release was a defining moment in pop culture, heralding the album era and the 1967 Summer of Love, while its reception achieved full cultural legitimisation for popular music and recognition for the medium as a genuine art form. The first Beatles album to be released with the same track listing in both the UK and the US, it spent 27 weeks at number one on the Record Retailer chart in the United Kingdom and 15 weeks at number one on the Billboard Top LPs chart in the United States. In 1968, it won four Grammy Awards, including Album of the Year, the first rock LP to receive this honour; in 2003, it was inducted into the National Recording Registry by the Library of Congress for being "culturally, historically, or aesthetically significant". It has topped several critics' and listeners' polls for the best album of all time, including those published by Rolling Stone magazine and in the book All Time Top 1000 Albums, and the UK's "Music of the Millennium" poll. More than 32 million copies had been sold worldwide as of 2011. It remains one of the best-selling albums of all time and was, as of 2018, the UK's best-selling studio album. A remixed and expanded edition of the album was released in 2017.

== Background ==
We were fed up with being the Beatles. We really hated that fucking four little mop-top approach. We were not boys, we were men [...] and thought of ourselves as artists rather than just performers.

— Paul McCartney

By late 1965, the Beatles had grown weary of live performance. In John Lennon's opinion, they could "send out four waxworks [...] and that would satisfy the crowds. Beatles concerts are nothing to do with music anymore. They're just bloody tribal rites." In June 1966, two days after finishing the album Revolver, the group set off for a tour that started in West Germany. While in Hamburg they received an anonymous telegram stating: "Do not go to Tokyo. Your life is in danger." The threat was taken seriously in light of the controversy surrounding the tour among Japan's religious and conservative groups, with particular opposition to the Beatles' planned performances at the sacred Nippon Budokan arena. As an added precaution, 35,000 police were mobilised and tasked with protecting the group, who were transported from hotels to concert venues in armoured vehicles. The Beatles then performed in the Philippines, where they were threatened and manhandled by its citizens for not visiting First Lady Imelda Marcos. The group were angry with their manager, Brian Epstein, for insisting on what they regarded as an exhausting and demoralising itinerary.

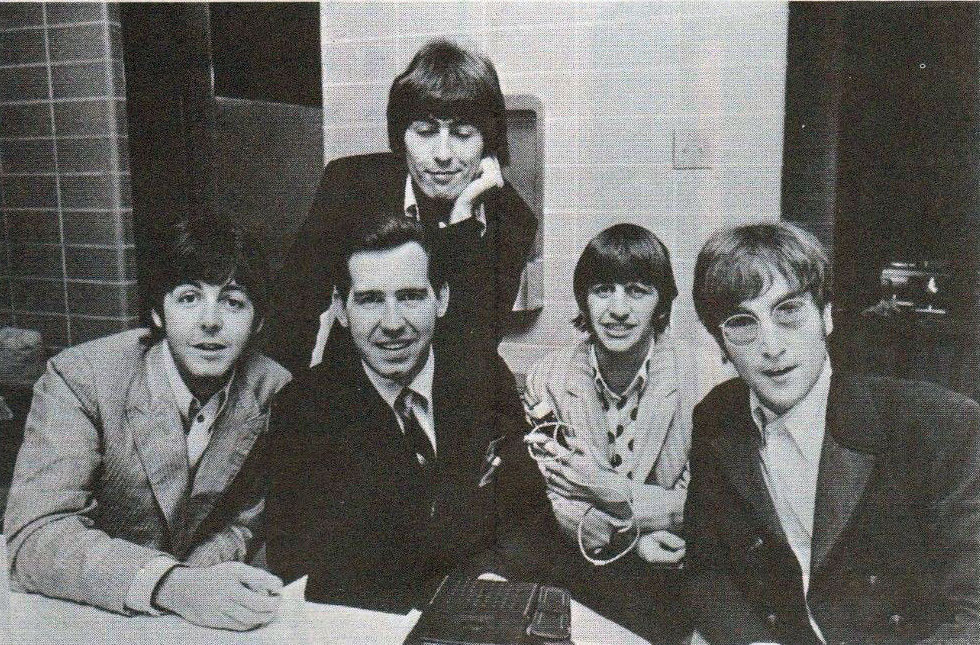
The group, with disc jockey Jim Stagg, while on their final tour in August 1966

The publication in the US of Lennon's remarks about the Beatles being "more popular than Jesus" then embroiled the band in controversy and protest in America's Bible Belt. A public apology eased tensions, but a US tour in August that was marked by reduced ticket sales, relative to the group's record attendances in 1965, and subpar performances proved to be their last. The author Nicholas Schaffner writes:

To the Beatles, playing such concerts had become a charade so remote from the new directions they were pursuing that not a single tune was attempted from the just-released Revolver LP, whose arrangements were for the most part impossible to reproduce with the limitations imposed by their two-guitars-bass-and-drums stage lineup.

On the Beatles' return to England, rumours began to circulate that they had decided to break up. George Harrison informed Epstein that he was leaving the band, but he was persuaded to stay on the assurance that there would be no more tours. The group took a three-month break, during which they focused on individual interests. Harrison travelled to India for six weeks to study the sitar under the instruction of Ravi Shankar and develop his interest in Hindu philosophy. Having been the last of the Beatles to concede that their live performances had become futile, Paul McCartney collaborated with Beatles producer George Martin on the soundtrack for the film The Family Way and holidayed in Kenya with Mal Evans, one of the Beatles' tour managers. Lennon acted in the film How I Won the War and attended art showings, such as one at the Indica Gallery where he met his future wife Yoko Ono. Ringo Starr used the break to spend time with his wife Maureen and son Zak.

== Inspiration and conception ==
While in London without his bandmates, McCartney took the hallucinogenic drug LSD (or "acid") for the first time, having long resisted Lennon and Harrison's insistence that he join them and Starr in experiencing its perception-heightening effects. According to author Jonathan Gould, this initiation into LSD afforded McCartney the "expansive new sense of possibility" that defined the group's next project, Sgt. Pepper's Lonely Hearts Club Band. Gould adds that McCartney's succumbing to peer pressure allowed Lennon "to play the role of psychedelic guide" to his songwriting partner, thereby facilitating a closer collaboration between the two than had been evident since early in the Beatles' career. For his part, Lennon had turned deeply introspective during the filming of How I Won the War in southern Spain in September 1966. His anxiety over his and the Beatles' future was reflected in "Strawberry Fields Forever", a song that provided the initial theme, regarding a Liverpool childhood, of the new album. On his return to London, Lennon embraced the city's arts culture, of which McCartney was a part, and shared his bandmate's interest in avant-garde and electronic-music composers such as Karlheinz Stockhausen, John Cage and Luciano Berio.

One of McCartney's sketches of his original idea of the front cover

In November, during his and Evans's return flight from Kenya, McCartney had an idea for a song that eventually formed the impetus of the Sgt. Pepper concept. His idea involved an Edwardian-era military band, for which Evans invented a name in the style of contemporary San Francisco-based groups such as Big Brother and the Holding Company and Quicksilver Messenger Service. (Note: McCartney has said that the idea for the title came from his mishearing Evans asking for "salt and pepper" over a meal.) In February 1967, McCartney suggested that the new album should represent a performance by the fictional band. This alter ego group would give them the freedom to experiment musically by releasing them from their image as Beatles. Martin recalled that the concept was not discussed at the start of the sessions, but it subsequently gave the album "a life of its own". (Note: The Beatles had often joked about Elvis Presley's decision to send his Cadillac car on a tour, and both Martin and McCartney remembered the band as envisioning the album as similarly touring in their place.)

Portions of Sgt. Pepper reflect the Beatles' general immersion in the blues, Motown and other American popular musical traditions. The author Ian MacDonald writes that when reviewing their rivals' recent work in late 1966, the Beatles identified the most significant LP as the Beach Boys' Pet Sounds, which Brian Wilson, the band's leader, had created in response to the Beatles' Rubber Soul. McCartney was highly impressed with the "harmonic structures" and choice of instruments used on Pet Sounds, and said that these elements encouraged him to think the Beatles could "get further out" than the Beach Boys had. He identified Pet Sounds as his main musical inspiration for Sgt. Pepper, adding that "[we] nicked a few ideas", although he felt it lacked the avant-garde quality he was seeking. Freak Out! by the Mothers of Invention has also been cited as having influenced Sgt. Pepper. According to the biographer Philip Norman, during the recording sessions McCartney repeatedly stated: "This is our Freak Out!" The music journalist Chet Flippo stated that McCartney was inspired to record a concept album after hearing Freak Out!

Indian music was another touchstone on Sgt. Pepper, principally for Lennon and Harrison. In a 1967 interview, Harrison said that the Beatles' ongoing success had encouraged them to continue developing musically and that, given their standing, "We can do things that please us without conforming to the standard pop idea. We are not only involved in pop music, but all music." McCartney envisioned the Beatles' alter egos being able to "do a bit of B. B. King, a bit of Stockhausen, a bit of Albert Ayler, a bit of Ravi Shankar, a bit of Pet Sounds, a bit of the Doors". He saw the group as "pushing frontiers" similar to other composers of the time, even though the Beatles did not "necessarily like what, say, Berio was doing".

== Recording and production ==
=== Recording history ===
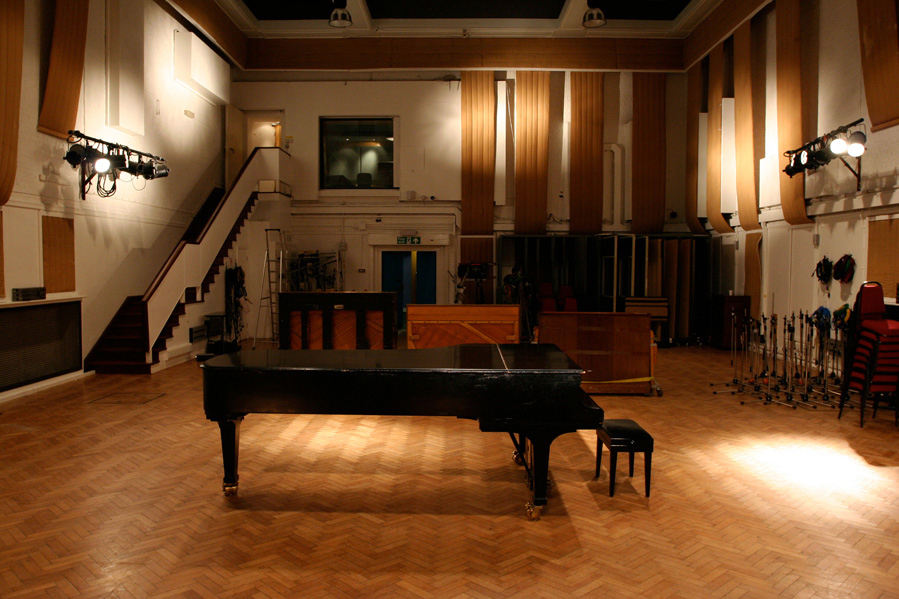
Abbey Road Studio Two, where nearly every track on Sgt. Pepper was recorded

Sessions began on 24 November 1966 in Studio Two at EMI Studios (subsequently Abbey Road Studios), marking the first time that the Beatles had come together since September. Afforded the luxury of a nearly limitless recording budget, and with no absolute deadline for completion, the band booked open-ended sessions that started at 7 pm and allowed them to work as late as they wanted. They began with "Strawberry Fields Forever", followed by two other songs that were thematically linked to their childhoods: "When I'm Sixty-Four", the first session for which took place on 6 December, and "Penny Lane".

"Strawberry Fields Forever" and "Penny Lane" were subsequently released as a double A-side in February 1967 after EMI and Epstein pressured Martin for a single. When it failed to reach number one in the UK, British press agencies speculated that the group's run of success might have ended, with headlines such as "Beatles Fail to Reach the Top", "First Time in Four Years" and "Has the Bubble Burst?" In keeping with the band's approach to their previously issued singles, the songs were then excluded from Sgt. Pepper. Martin later described the decision to drop these two songs as "the biggest mistake of my professional life". In his judgment, "Strawberry Fields Forever", which he and the band spent an unprecedented 55 hours of studio time recording, "set the agenda for the whole album". He explained: "It was going to be a record ... [with songs that] couldn't be performed live: they were designed to be studio productions and that was the difference." McCartney declared: "Now our performance is that record."

Music papers started to slag us off ... because [Sgt. Pepper] took five months to record, and I remember the great glee seeing in one of the papers how the Beatles have dried up ... and I was sitting rubbing my hands, saying "You just wait."

— Paul McCartney

According to the musicologist Walter Everett, Sgt. Pepper marks the beginning of McCartney's ascendancy as the Beatles' dominant creative force. He wrote more than half of the album's material while asserting increasing control over the recording of his compositions. (Note: In Emerick's opinion, the recording of Sgt. Pepper marks the emergence of McCartney as the Beatles' de facto producer, as Martin was increasingly absent near the end of late-night sessions that often lasted until dawn.) In an effort to get the right sound, the Beatles attempted numerous re-takes of McCartney's song "Getting Better". When the decision was made to re-record the basic track, Starr was summoned to the studio, but called off soon afterwards as the focus switched from rhythm to vocal tracking. Much of the bass guitar on the album was mixed upfront. Preferring to overdub his bass part last, McCartney tended to play other instruments when recording a song's backing track. This approach afforded him the time to devise bass lines that were melodically adventurous – one of the qualities he especially admired in Wilson's work on Pet Sounds – and complemented the song's final arrangement. (Note: Wilson was similarly impressed with the intricate bass playing on Rubber Soul. McCartney later said that he, Wilson and Motown's James Jamerson were the three players "doing melodic bass lines at that time ... all picking up on what each other did".) McCartney played keyboard instruments such as piano, grand piano and Lowrey organ, in addition to electric guitar on some songs, while Martin variously contributed on Hohner Pianet, harpsichord and harmonium. Lennon's songs similarly showed a preference for keyboard instruments. (Note: "Strawberry Fields Forever" made prominent use of Mellotron, a keyboard instrument on which the keys triggered tape-recordings of a variety of instruments, enabling its user to play keyboard parts using those voices.)

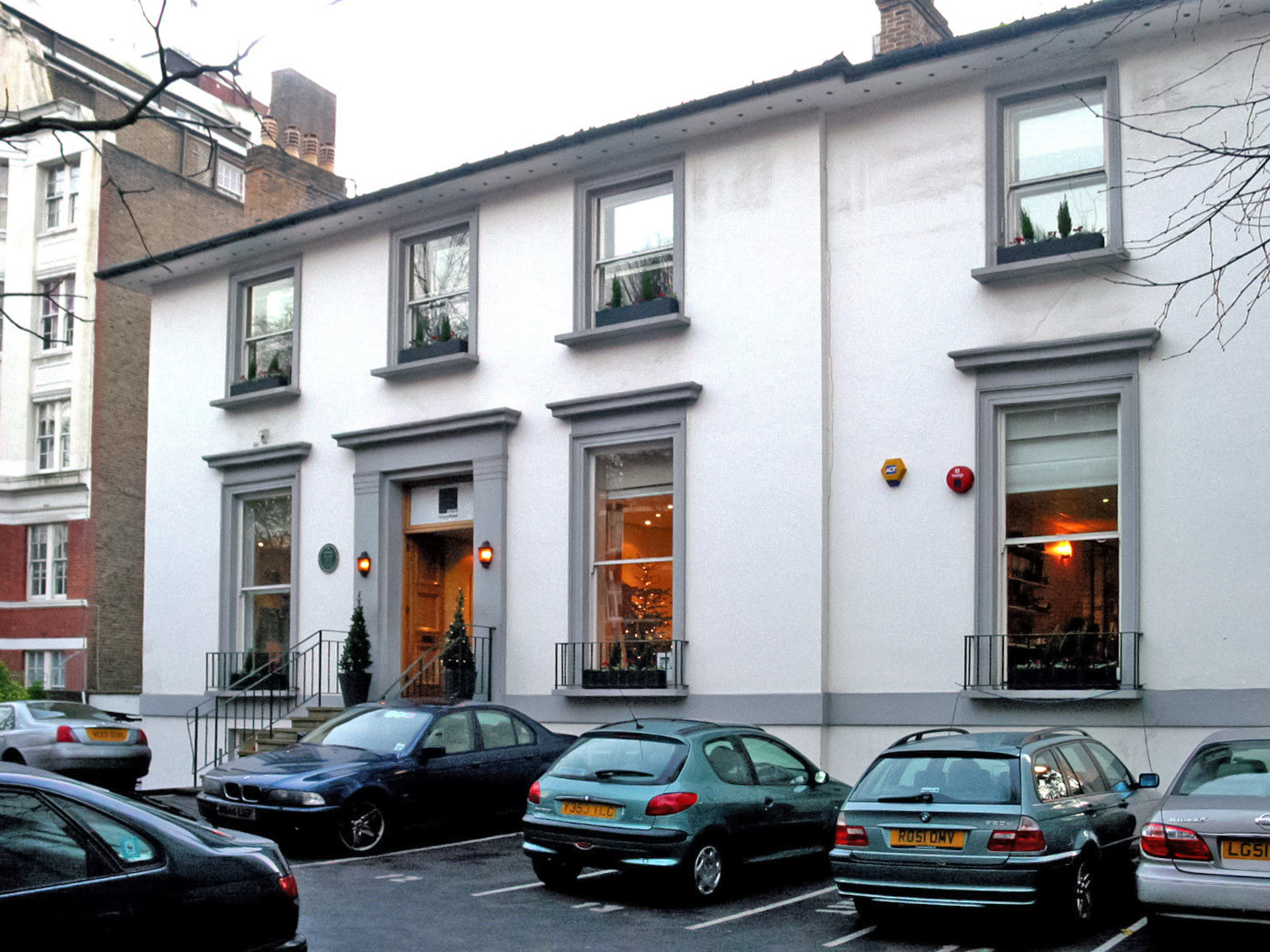
Abbey Road Studios (formerly EMI Studios) in 2005

Although Harrison's role as lead guitarist was limited during the sessions, Everett considers that "his contribution to the album is strong in several ways." He provided Indian instrumentation in the form of sitar, tambura and swarmandal, and Martin credited him with being the most committed of the Beatles in striving for new sounds. (Note: In a 2017 interview, Starr said with regard to Harrison's guitar contributions: "Actually, Paul and I were talking about him when we were both listening to Sgt Pepper's for the [50th] anniversary and saying how important George's work on guitar was on that record.") Starr's adoption of loose calfskin heads for his tom-toms ensured his drum kit had a deeper timbre than he had previously achieved with plastic heads. As on Revolver, the Beatles increasingly used session musicians, particularly for classical-inspired arrangements. Norman comments that Lennon's prominent vocal on some of McCartney's songs "hugely enhanced their atmosphere", particularly "Lovely Rita".

Within an hour of completing the last overdubs on the album's songs, on 20 April 1967, the group returned to Harrison's "Only a Northern Song", the basic track of which they had taped in February. The Beatles overdubbed random sounds and instrumentation before submitting it as the first of four new songs they were contracted to supply to United Artists for inclusion in the animated film Yellow Submarine. In author Mark Lewisohn's description, it was a "curious" session, but one that demonstrated the Beatles' "tremendous appetite for recording". During the Sgt. Pepper sessions, the band also recorded "Carnival of Light", a McCartney-led experimental piece created for the Million Volt Light and Sound Rave, held at the Roundhouse Theatre on 28 January and 4 February. The album was completed on 21 April with the recording of random noises and voices that were included on the run-out groove, preceded by a high-pitched tone that could be heard by dogs but was inaudible to most human ears.

=== Studio ambience and happenings ===
The Beatles sought to inject an atmosphere of celebration into the recording sessions. Weary of the bland look inside EMI, they introduced psychedelic lighting to the studio space, including a device on which five red fluorescent tubes were fixed to a microphone stand, a lava lamp, a red darkroom lamp, and a stroboscope, the last of which they soon abandoned. Harrison later said the studio became the band's clubhouse for Sgt. Pepper; David Crosby, Mick Jagger and Donovan were among the musician friends who visited them there. (Note: During a 24 February overdubbing session for "Lovely Rita", the Beatles' guests included Crosby and Shawn Phillips, Donovan's guitarist. Photos published in Beatles Monthly magazine showed Lennon, McCartney, Harrison and Crosby grouped around a microphone, and a Beat Instrumental report stated that the backing vocals were recorded that night with Crosby's participation. Phillips later supported this and said that he too sang backing vocals with the three Beatles. However, Phillips' recollection is not supported by others, and the group vocals were instead overdubbed on 7 March.) The band members also dressed up in psychedelic fashions, leading one session trumpeter to wonder whether they were in costume for a new film. Drug-taking was prevalent during the sessions, with Martin later recalling that the group would steal away to "have something". (Note: While recording the vocals for "Getting Better" on 21 March, Lennon started feeling ill, having accidentally taken LSD when he meant to take an upper. Unaware that he was under the influence, Martin escorted him to the roof of the building for some fresh air and returned to the studio. When they learned that Lennon was alone on the rail-less rooftop, Harrison and McCartney rushed up to retrieve him and prevent a possible accident.)

The 10 February session for orchestral overdubs on "A Day in the Life" was staged as a happening typical of the London avant-garde scene. The Beatles invited numerous friends and the session players wore formal dinner-wear augmented with fancy-dress props. Overseen by NEMS employee Tony Bramwell, the proceedings were filmed on seven handheld cameras, with the band doing some of the filming. Following this event, the group considered making a television special based on the album. Each of the songs was to be represented with a clip directed by a different director, but the cost of recording Sgt. Pepper made the idea prohibitive to EMI. (Note: Following the "Day in the Life" filming, the music press often reported on the idea of a Sgt. Pepper TV special. Although a report in July stated that the plan had been scrapped, a filming schedule was drawn up for late in the year, by which point the Beatles were committed to making Magical Mystery Tour.) For the 15 March session for "Within You Without You", Studio Two was transformed with Indian carpets placed on the walls, dimmed lighting and burning incense to evoke the requisite Indian mood. Lennon described the session as a "great swinging evening" with "400 Indian fellas" among the guests.

The Beatles took an acetate disc of the completed album to the flat of American singer Cass Elliot, off King's Road in Chelsea. There, at six in the morning, they played it at full volume with speakers set in open window frames. The group's friend and former press agent, Derek Taylor, remembered that residents of the neighbourhood opened their windows and listened without complaint to what they understood to be unreleased Beatles music.

=== Technical aspects ===
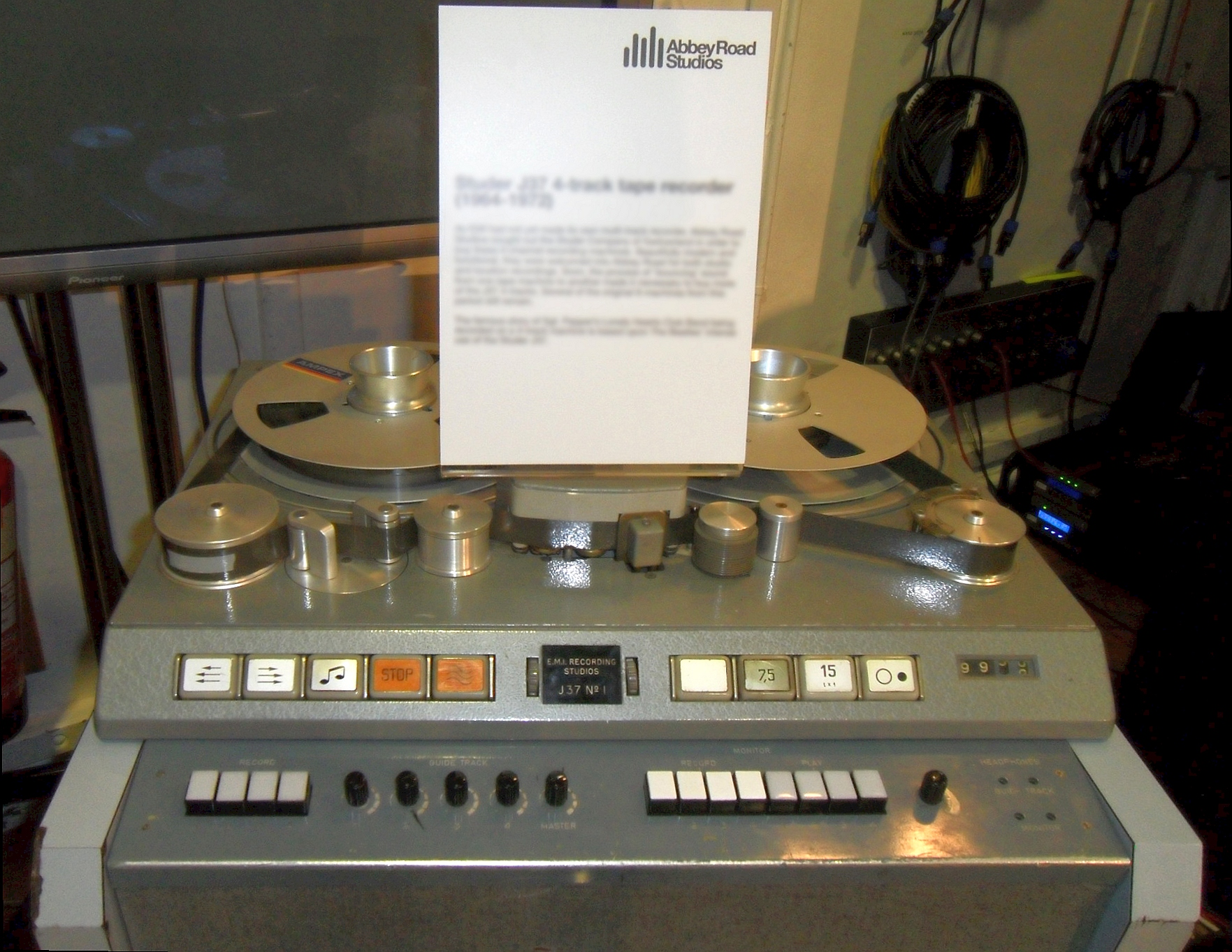
One of EMI's Studer J37 four-track tape recorders, the machines used to record Sgt. Pepper

In his book on ambient music, The Ambient Century, Mark Prendergast views Sgt. Pepper as the Beatles' "homage" to Stockhausen and Cage, adding that its "rich, tape-manipulated sound" shows the influence of electronic and experimental composer Pierre Schaeffer. Martin recalled that Sgt. Pepper "grew naturally out of Revolver", marking "an era of almost continuous technological experimentation". The album was recorded using four-track equipment, since eight-track tape recorders were not operational in commercial studios in London until late 1967. As with previous Beatles albums, the Sgt. Pepper recordings made extensive use of reduction mixing, a technique in which one to four tracks from one recorder are mixed and dubbed down onto a master four-track machine, enabling the engineers to give the group a virtual multitrack studio. EMI's Studer J37 four-track machines were well suited to reduction mixing, as the high quality of the recordings that they produced minimised the increased noise associated with the process. When recording the orchestra for "A Day in the Life", Martin synchronised a four-track recorder playing the Beatles' backing track to another one taping the orchestral overdub. The engineer Ken Townsend devised a method for accomplishing this by using a 50 Hz control signal between the two machines.

Listening to each stage of their recording, once they've done the first couple of tracks, it's often hard to see what they're still looking for, it sounds so complete. Often the final complicated, well-layered version seems to have drowned the initial simple melody. But they know it's not right, even if they can't put it into words. Their dedication is impressive, gnawing away at the same song for stretches of ten hours each.

— Hunter Davies, 1968

The production on "Strawberry Fields Forever" was especially complex, involving the innovative splicing of two takes that were recorded in different tempos and pitches. Emerick remembers that during the recording of Revolver, "we had got used to being asked to do the impossible, and we knew that the word 'no' didn't exist in the Beatles' vocabulary." A key feature of Sgt. Pepper is Martin and Emerick's liberal use of signal processing to shape the sound of the recording, which included the application of dynamic range compression, reverb and signal limiting. Relatively new modular effects units were used, such as running voices and instruments through a Leslie speaker. Several innovative production techniques feature prominently on the recordings, including direct injection, pitch control and ambiophonics. The bass part on "Sgt. Pepper's Lonely Hearts Club Band" was the first example of the Beatles recording via direct injection (DI), which Townsend devised as a method for plugging electric guitars directly into the recording console. In Kenneth Womack's opinion, the use of DI on the album's title track "afforded McCartney's bass with richer textures and tonal clarity".

Some of the mixing employed automatic double tracking (ADT), a system that uses tape recorders to create a simultaneous doubling of a sound. ADT was invented by Townsend during the Revolver sessions in 1966 especially for the Beatles, who regularly expressed a desire for a technical alternative to having to record doubled lead vocals. Another important effect was varispeeding, a technique that the Beatles used extensively on Revolver. Martin cites "Lucy in the Sky with Diamonds" as having the most variations of tape speed on Sgt. Pepper. During the recording of Lennon's vocals, the tape speed was reduced from 50 cycles per second to 45, which produced a higher and thinner-sounding track when played back at the normal speed. For the album's title track, the recording of Starr's drum kit was enhanced by the use of damping and close-miking. MacDonald credits the new recording technique with creating a "three-dimensional" sound that, along with other Beatles innovations, engineers in the US would soon adopt as standard practice.

Artistic experimentation, such as the placement of random gibberish in the run-out groove, became one of the album's defining features. Sgt. Pepper was the first pop album to be mastered without the momentary gaps that are typically placed between tracks as a point of demarcation. It made use of two crossfades that blended songs together, giving the impression of a continuous live performance. (Note: "Sgt. Pepper" was crossfaded into "With a Little Help from My Friends" and the "Sgt. Pepper" reprise was crossfaded into "A Day in the Life".) Although both stereo and monaural mixes of the album were prepared, the Beatles were minimally involved in what they regarded as the less important stereo mix sessions, leaving the task to Martin and Emerick. Emerick recalls: "We spent three weeks on the mono mixes and maybe three days on the stereo." Most listeners ultimately heard only the stereo version. He estimates that the group spent 700 hours on the LP, more than 30 times that of the first Beatles album, Please Please Me, which cost £400 to produce. The final cost of Sgt. Pepper was approximately £25,000 (equivalent to £398,000 in 2025).

=== Band dynamics ===
Author Robert Rodriguez writes that while Lennon, Harrison and Starr embraced the creative freedom afforded by McCartney's band-within-a-band idea, they "went along with the concept with varying degrees of enthusiasm". Studio personnel recalled that Lennon had "never seemed so happy" as during the Sgt. Pepper sessions. In a 1969 interview with Barry Miles, however, Lennon said he was depressed and that while McCartney was "full of confidence", he was "going through murder". Lennon explained his view of the album's concept: "Paul said, 'Come and see the show', I didn't. I said, 'I read the news today, oh boy.'"

Everett describes Starr as having been "largely bored" during the sessions, with the drummer later lamenting: "The biggest memory I have of Sgt. Pepper ... is I learned to play chess". In The Beatles Anthology, Harrison said he had little interest in McCartney's concept of a fictitious group and that, after his experiences in India, "my heart was still out there ... I was losing interest in being 'fab' at that point." Harrison added that, having enjoyed recording Rubber Soul and Revolver, he disliked how the group's approach on Sgt. Pepper became "an assembly process" whereby, "A lot of the time it ended up with just Paul playing the piano and Ringo keeping the tempo, and we weren't allowed to play as a band as much."

In Lewisohn's opinion, Sgt. Pepper represents the group's last unified effort, displaying a cohesion that deteriorated immediately following the album's completion and entirely disappeared by the release of The Beatles (also known as the "White Album") in 1968. Martin recalled in 1987 that throughout the making of Sgt. Pepper, "There was a very good spirit at that time between all the Beatles and ourselves. We were all conscious that we were doing something that was great." He said that while McCartney effectively led the project, and sometimes annoyed his bandmates, "Paul appreciated John's contribution on Pepper. In terms of quantity, it wasn't great, but in terms of quality, it was enormous."

== Songs ==
=== Overview ===
Among musicologists, Allan Moore says that Sgt. Pepper is composed mainly of rock and pop music, while Michael Hannan and Naphtali Wagner both see it as an album of various genres; Hannan says it features "a broad variety of musical and theatrical genres". According to Hannan and Wagner, the music incorporates the stylistic influences of rock and roll, vaudeville, big band, piano jazz, blues, chamber, circus, music hall, avant-garde, and Western and Indian classical music. Wagner feels the album's music reconciles the "diametrically opposed aesthetic ideals" of classical and psychedelia, achieving a "psycheclassical synthesis" of the two forms. Musicologist John Covach describes Sgt. Pepper as "proto-progressive".

We didn't really shove the LP full of pot and drugs but, I mean, there was an effect. We were more consciously trying to keep it out. You wouldn't say, "I had some acid, baby, so groovy," but there was a feeling that something had happened between Revolver and Sgt. Pepper.

— John Lennon, 1968

According to author George Case, all of the songs on Sgt. Pepper were perceived by contemporary listeners as being drug-inspired, with 1967 marking the pinnacle of LSD's influence on pop music. Shortly before the album's release, the BBC banned "A Day in the Life" from British radio because of the phrase "I'd love to turn you on"; the BBC stated that it could "encourage a permissive attitude towards drug-taking". Although Lennon and McCartney denied any drug-related interpretation of the song at the time, McCartney later suggested that the line referred to either drugs or sex. The meaning of "Lucy in the Sky with Diamonds" became the subject of speculation, as many believed that the title was code for LSD. In "Being for the Benefit of Mr. Kite!", the reference to "Henry the Horse" contains two common slang terms for heroin. Fans speculated that Henry the Horse was a drug dealer and "Fixing a Hole" was a reference to heroin use. Others noted lyrics such as "I get high" from "With a Little Help from My Friends", "take some tea" – slang for cannabis use – from "Lovely Rita", and "digging the weeds" from "When I'm Sixty-Four".

The author Sheila Whiteley attributes Sgt. Pepper's underlying philosophy not only to the drug culture, but also to metaphysics and the non-violent approach of the flower power movement. The musicologist Oliver Julien views the album as an embodiment of "the social, the musical, and more generally, the cultural changes of the 1960s". The album's primary value, according to Moore, is its ability to "capture, more vividly than almost anything contemporaneous, its own time and place". Whiteley agrees, crediting the album with "provid[ing] a historical snapshot of England during the run-up to the Summer of Love". Several scholars have applied a hermeneutic strategy to their analysis of Sgt. Pepper's lyrics, identifying loss of innocence and the dangers of overindulgence in fantasies or illusions as the most prominent themes.

=== Side one ===
==== "Sgt. Pepper's Lonely Hearts Club Band" ====
The beginning of the first verse of "Sgt. Pepper's Lonely Hearts Club Band"
In its opening line, "It was twenty years ago today", the song introduces a historical perspective on pop music, delivered in what music journalist Chris Ingham terms McCartney's "best Little Richard holler".

Sgt. Pepper opens with the title track, starting with 10 seconds of the combined sounds of a pit orchestra warming up and an audience waiting for a concert, creating the illusion of the album as a live performance. (Note: The crowd noises were gleaned from EMI's tape archive, including audience sounds recorded at the Royal Albert Hall and the Queen Elizabeth Hall for the murmuring, and Martin's recording of a 1961 comedy show, Beyond the Fringe, for the laughter. The opening ambient sounds were captured during the 10 February orchestral session for "A Day in the Life".) McCartney serves as the master of ceremonies, welcoming the audience to a twentieth-anniversary reunion concert by Sgt. Pepper's band, who, led by Lennon, then sing a message of appreciation for the crowd's warm response. Womack says the lyric bridges the fourth wall between the artist and their audience. He argues that, paradoxically, the lyrics "exemplify the mindless rhetoric of rock concert banter" while "mock[ing] the very notion of a pop album's capacity for engendering authentic interconnection between artist and audience". In his view, the mixed message ironically serves to distance the group from their fans while simultaneously "gesturing toward" them as alter egos.

The song's five-bar bridge is filled by a French horn quartet. Womack credits the recording's use of a brass ensemble with distorted electric guitars as an early example of rock fusion. MacDonald agrees, describing the track as an overture rather than a song, and a "fusion of Edwardian variety orchestra" and contemporary hard rock. (Note: The song's lead guitar part was played by McCartney, who replaced an earlier effort by Harrison.) Hannan describes the track's unorthodox stereo mix as "typical of the album", with the lead vocal in the right speaker during the verses, but in the left during the chorus and middle eight. McCartney returns as the master of ceremonies near the end of the song, announcing the entrance of an alter ego named Billy Shears.

==== "With a Little Help from My Friends" ====
The title track segues into "With a Little Help from My Friends" amid the sound of screaming fans recorded during a Beatles concert at the Hollywood Bowl. In his role as Billy Shears, Starr contributes a baritone lead vocal that Womack credits with imparting an element of "earnestness in sharp contrast with the ironic distance of the title track". Written by Lennon and McCartney, the song's lyrics centre on a theme of questions, beginning with Starr asking the audience whether they would leave if he sang out of tune. In the call-and-response style, Lennon, McCartney and Harrison go on to ask their bandmate questions about the meaning of friendship and true love; by the final verse, Starr provides unequivocal answers. In MacDonald's opinion, the lyric is "at once communal and personal ... [and] meant as a gesture of inclusivity; everyone could join in." Everett comments that the track's use of a major key double-plagal cadence became commonplace in pop music following the release of Sgt. Pepper.

==== "Lucy in the Sky with Diamonds" ====
The beginning of "Lucy in the Sky with Diamonds"
The recording's blend of tambura and Lowrey organ creates what Hannan views as one of the album's "most unusual sound combination[s]". Womack describes the combination of these instruments and Lennon's vocals as the Beatles' "most vivid instance of musical timbre".

Despite widespread suspicion that the title of "Lucy in the Sky with Diamonds" contained a hidden reference to LSD, Lennon insisted that it was derived from a pastel drawing by his four-year-old son Julian. A hallucinatory chapter from Lewis Carroll's 1871 novel Through the Looking-Glass, a favourite of Lennon's, inspired the song's atmosphere. According to MacDonald, "the lyric explicitly recreates the psychedelic experience".

The first verse begins with what Womack characterises as "an invitation in the form of an imperative" through the line: "Picture yourself in a boat on a river", and continues with imaginative imagery, including "tangerine trees", "rocking horse people" and "newspaper taxis". The musical backing includes a phrase played by McCartney on a Lowrey organ, treated with ADT to sound like a celeste, and tambura drone. Harrison also contributed a lead guitar part that doubles Lennon's vocal over the verses in the style of a sarangi player accompanying an Indian khyal singer. The music critic Tim Riley identifies the track as a moment "in the album, [where] the material world is completely clouded in the mythical by both text and musical atmosphere".

==== "Getting Better" ====
MacDonald considers "Getting Better" to contain "the most ebullient performance" on Sgt. Pepper. Womack credits the track's "driving rock sound" with distinguishing it from the album's overtly psychedelic material; its lyrics inspire the listener "to usurp the past by living well and flourishing in the present". He cites it as a strong example of Lennon and McCartney's collaborative songwriting, particularly Lennon's addition of the line "It can't get no worse", which serves as a "sarcastic rejoinder" to McCartney's chorus: "It's getting better all the time". Lennon's contribution to the lyric also includes a confessional regarding his having been violent with female companions: "I used to be cruel to my woman". In Womack's opinion, the song encourages the listener to follow the speaker's example and "alter their own angst-ridden ways": "Man I was mean, but I'm changing my scene and I'm doing the best that I can."

==== "Fixing a Hole" ====
"Fixing a Hole" deals with McCartney's desire to let his mind wander freely and to express his creativity without the burden of self-conscious insecurities. (Note: The backing track for "Fixing a Hole" was recorded at Regent Sound Studio, in central London, after the Beatles were unable to arrange a last-minute session at EMI Studios.) Womack interprets the lyric as "the speaker's search for identity among the crowd", in particular the "quests for consciousness and connection" that differentiate individuals from society as a whole. MacDonald characterises it as a "distracted and introverted track", during which McCartney forgoes his "usual smooth design" in favour of "something more preoccupied". He cites Harrison's electric guitar solo as serving the track well, capturing its mood by conveying detachment. Womack notes McCartney's adaptation of the lyric "a hole in the roof where the rain leaks in" from Elvis Presley's "We're Gonna Move".

==== "She's Leaving Home" ====
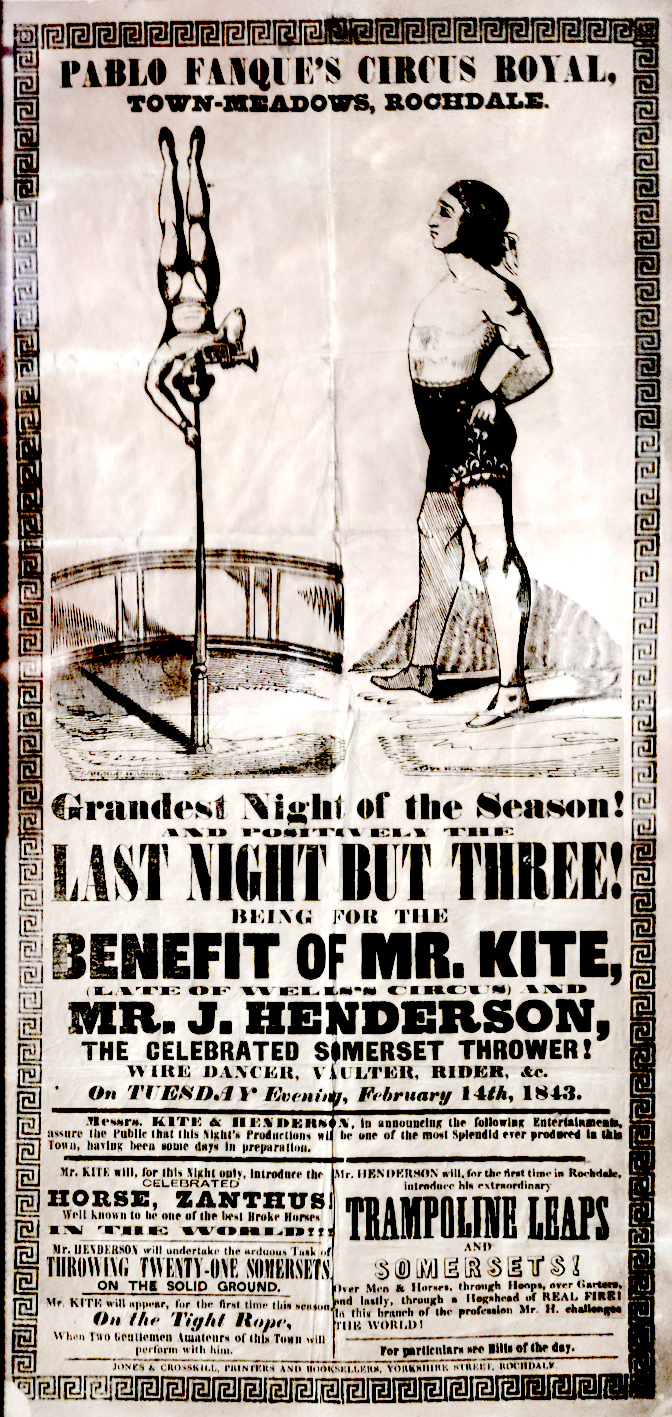
The Pablo Fanque Circus Royal poster from 1843 that inspired Lennon's lyrics to "Being for the Benefit of Mr. Kite!"

In Everett's view, the lyrics to "She's Leaving Home" address the problem of alienation "between disagreeing peoples", particularly those distanced from each other by the generation gap. McCartney's narrative details the plight of a young woman escaping the control of her parents, and was inspired by a piece about teenage runaways published in the Daily Mail. Lennon supplies a supporting vocal that conveys the parents' anguish and confusion. It is the first track on Sgt. Pepper that eschews the use of guitars and drums, featuring only a string nonet with a harp. (Note: McCartney hired Mike Leander to arrange the string section on "She's Leaving Home" since Martin was producing a session by another artist and was unable to meet with him straightaway. Martin was highly upset at McCartney's impatience, but conducted the musicians using the score more or less as written.) Music historian Doyle Greene views it as the first of the album's songs to address "the crisis of middle-class life in the late 1960s" and comments on its surprisingly conservative sentiments, given McCartney's absorption in the London avant-garde scene.

==== "Being for the Benefit of Mr. Kite!" ====
Lennon adapted the lyrics for "Being for the Benefit of Mr. Kite!" from an 1843 poster for Pablo Fanque's circus that he purchased at an antique shop in Kent on the day of filming the promotional film for "Strawberry Fields Forever". Womack views the track as an effective blending of a print source and music, while MacDonald describes it as "a spontaneous expression of its author's playful hedonism". Tasked by Lennon to evoke a circus atmosphere so vivid that he could "smell the sawdust", Martin and Emerick created a sound collage comprising randomly assembled recordings of harmoniums, harmonicas and calliopes. Everett says that the track's use of Edwardian imagery thematically links it with the album's title song. Gould also views "Mr. Kite!" as a return to the LP's opening motif, albeit that of show business and with the focus now on performers and a show in a radically different setting. (Note: In the initial running order, dated 6 April, "Being for the Benefit of Mr. Kite!" was sequenced as the third track, following "With a Little Help from My Friends".)

=== Side two ===
==== "Within You Without You" ====
We're not trying to outwit the public. The whole idea is to try a little bit to lead people into different tastes.

— George Harrison, 1967

Harrison's Hindustani classical music-inspired "Within You Without You" reflects his immersion in the teachings of the Hindu Vedas, while its musical form and Indian instrumentation, such as sitar, tabla, dilrubas and tamburas, recalls the Hindu devotional tradition known as bhajan. Harrison recorded the song with London-based Indian musicians from the Asian Music Circle; none of the other Beatles played on the recording. He and Martin then worked on a Western string arrangement that imitated the slides and bends typical of Indian music. The song's pitch is derived from the eastern Khamaj scale, which is akin to the Mixolydian mode in the West.

MacDonald regards "Within You Without You" as "the most distant departure from the staple Beatles sound in their discography", and a work that represents the "conscience" of the LP through the lyrics' rejection of Western materialism. Womack calls it "quite arguably, the album's ethical soul" and views the line "With our love we could save the world" as a concise reflection of the Beatles' idealism that soon inspired the Summer of Love. The track ends with a burst of laughter gleaned from a tape in the EMI archive; some listeners interpreted this as a mockery of the song, but Harrison explained: "It's a release after five minutes of sad music ... You were supposed to hear the audience anyway, as they listen to Sergeant Pepper's Show. That was the style of the album."

==== "When I'm Sixty-Four" ====
"When I'm Sixty-Four"
Hannan writes: "The rich timbres of the clarinets give the mix a fuller, fatter sound than many of the other tracks on the album."

MacDonald characterises McCartney's "When I'm Sixty-Four" as a song "aimed chiefly at parents", borrowing heavily from the English music hall style of George Formby, while invoking images of the illustrator Donald McGill's seaside postcards. Its sparse arrangement includes clarinets, chimes and piano. Moore views the song as a synthesis of ragtime and pop, adding that its position following "Within You Without You" – a blend of Indian classical music and pop – demonstrates the diversity of the album's material. He says the music hall atmosphere is reinforced by McCartney's vocal delivery and the recording's use of chromaticism, a harmonic pattern that can be traced to Scott Joplin's "The Ragtime Dance" and "The Blue Danube" by Johann Strauss. Varispeeding was used on the track, raising its pitch by a semitone in an attempt to make McCartney sound younger. Everett comments that the lyric's protagonist is sometimes associated with the Lonely Hearts Club Band, but in his opinion the song is thematically unconnected to the others on the album.

==== "Lovely Rita" ====
Womack describes "Lovely Rita" as a work of "full-tilt psychedelia" that contrasts sharply with the preceding track. Citing McCartney's recollection that he drew inspiration from learning that the American term for a female traffic warden was a meter maid, Gould deems it a celebration of an encounter that evokes Swinging London and the contemporaneous chic for military-style uniforms. MacDonald regards the song as a "satire on authority" that is "imbued with an exuberant interest in life that lifts the spirits, dispersing self-absorption". The arrangement includes a quartet of comb-and-paper kazoos, a piano solo by Martin, and a coda in which the Beatles indulge in panting, groaning and other vocalised sounds. In Gould's view, the track represents "the show-stopper in the Pepper Band's repertoire: a funny, sexy, extroverted song that comes closer to the spirit of rock 'n' roll than anything else on the album".

==== "Good Morning Good Morning" ====
Lennon was inspired to write "Good Morning Good Morning" after watching a television commercial for Kellogg's Corn Flakes, the jingle of which he adapted for the song's refrain. The track uses the bluesy Mixolydian mode in A, which Everett credits with "perfectly express[ing] Lennon's grievance against complacency". According to Greene, the song contrasts sharply with "She's Leaving Home" by providing "the more 'avant-garde' subversive study of suburban life". The time signature varies across 5/4, 3/4 and 4/4, while the arrangement includes a horn section comprising members of Sounds Inc. MacDonald highlights the "rollicking" brass score, Starr's drumming and McCartney's "coruscating pseudo-Indian guitar solo" among the elements that convey a sense of aggression on a track he deems a "disgusted canter through the muck, mayhem, and mundanity of the human farmyard". A series of animal noises appear during the fade-out that are sequenced – at Lennon's request – so that each successive animal could conceivably scare or devour the preceding one. The sound of a chicken clucking overlaps with a stray guitar note at the start of the next track, creating a seamless transition between the two songs.

==== "Sgt. Pepper's Lonely Hearts Club Band (Reprise)" ====
"Sgt. Pepper's Lonely Hearts Club Band (Reprise)" follows as a segue to the album's finale. The hard-rocking song was written after Neil Aspinall, the Beatles' road manager, suggested that since "Sgt. Pepper" opened the album, the fictional band should make an appearance near the end. Sung by all four Beatles, the reprise omits the brass section from the title track and has a faster tempo. With Harrison on lead guitar, it serves as a rare example from the Sgt. Pepper sessions where the group taped a basic track live with their usual stage instrumentation. MacDonald finds the Beatles' excitement tangibly translated on the recording, which is again augmented with ambient crowd noise.

==== "A Day in the Life" ====
The "dream sequence" from "A Day in the Life"
Womack describes the "sarcastic brass retort" that ends the sequence as the "most decisive moment" on Sgt. Pepper.

"A Day in the Life" is the final track on the album. The last chord of the "Sgt. Pepper" reprise segues amid audience applause to acoustic guitar strumming and the start of what Moore calls "one of the most harrowing songs ever written". "A Day in the Life" consists of four verses by Lennon, a bridge, two aleatoric orchestral crescendos, and an interpolated middle part written and sung by McCartney. The first crescendo serves as a segue between the third verse and the middle part, leading to a bridge known as the "dream sequence". Lennon drew inspiration for the lyrics from a Daily Mail report on potholes in the Lancashire town of Blackburn and an article in the same newspaper relating to the death of Beatles friend and Guinness heir Tara Browne.

According to Martin, Lennon and McCartney were equally responsible for the decision to use an orchestra. Martin said that Lennon requested "a tremendous build-up, from nothing up to something absolutely like the end of the world", while McCartney realised this idea by drawing inspiration from Cage and Stockhausen. Womack describes Starr's performance as "one of his most inventive drum parts on record". The thunderous piano chord that concludes the track and the album was produced by recording Lennon, Starr, McCartney and Evans simultaneously sounding an E major chord on three separate pianos; Martin then augmented the sound with a harmonium.

Riley characterises the song as a "postlude to the Pepper fantasy ... that sets all the other songs in perspective", while shattering the illusion of "Pepperland" by introducing the "parallel universe of everyday life". MacDonald describes the track as "a song not of disillusionment with life itself, but of disenchantment with the limits of mundane perception".

As "A Day in the Life" ends, a 15-kilohertz high-frequency tone is heard; it was added at Lennon's suggestion with the intention that it would annoy dogs. (Note: Lennon was unaware that most record players and speakers of the time were incapable of reproducing the tone, which many listeners would not hear until the release of the CD version in 1987.) This is followed by the sounds of backwards laughter and random gibberish that were pressed into the record's concentric run-out groove, which loops back into itself endlessly on any record player not equipped with an automatic needle return. Lennon can be heard saying, "Been so high", followed by McCartney's response: "Never could be any other way." (Note: When the audio contained in the run-out groove is played in reverse and slowed-down, McCartney can be heard shouting, "I will fuck you like Superman", with Starr and Harrison giggling in the background. The author Will Romano comments that, in this way, Sgt. Pepper closes with nonsensical vocals just as Freak Out! does.)

=== Concept ===
According to Womack, with Sgt. Pepper's opening song "the Beatles manufacture an artificial textual space in which to stage their art." The reprise of the title song appears on side two, just before the climactic "A Day in the Life", creating a framing device. In Lennon and Starr's view, only the first two songs and the reprise are conceptually connected. In a 1980 interview, Lennon stated that his compositions had nothing to do with the Sgt. Pepper concept, adding: "Sgt. Pepper is called the first concept album, but it doesn't go anywhere ... it works because we said it worked."

In MacFarlane's view, the Beatles "chose to employ an overarching thematic concept in an apparent effort to unify individual tracks". Everett contends that the album's "musical unity results ... from motivic relationships between key areas, particularly involving C, E, and G". Moore argues that the recording's "use of common harmonic patterns and falling melodies" contributes to its overall cohesiveness, which he describes as narrative unity, but not necessarily conceptual unity. MacFarlane agrees, suggesting that with the exception of the reprise, the album lacks the melodic and harmonic continuity that is consistent with cyclic form.

In a 1995 interview, McCartney recalled that the Liverpool childhood theme behind the first three songs recorded during the Sgt. Pepper sessions was never formalised as an album-wide concept, but he said that it served as a "device" or underlying theme throughout the project. MacDonald identifies allusions to the Beatles' upbringing throughout Sgt. Pepper that are "too persuasive to ignore". These include evocations of the postwar Northern music-hall tradition, references to Northern industrial towns and Liverpool schooldays, Lewis Carroll-inspired imagery (acknowledging Lennon's favourite childhood reading), the use of brass instrumentation in the style of park bandstand performances (familiar to McCartney through his visits to Sefton Park), and the album cover's flower arrangement akin to a floral clock. Norman partly agrees; he says that "In many ways, the album carried on the childhood and Liverpool theme with its circus and fairground effects, its pervading atmosphere of the traditional northern music hall that was in both its main creators' [McCartney and Lennon's] blood." (Note: Norman also identifies Sgt. Pepper as being "in other places, grown-up to an unprecedented, indeed perilous, degree". He concludes of this combination: "Its superabundance reflected a conscious wish on the Beatles' part to make amends to their fans for their abandonment of touring. Clamped between headphones in a recording studio, they managed to put on a live show more exciting, more intimate, than any since they'd left the Cavern.")

== Packaging ==
=== Front cover ===
Rough sketch by Blake of the front cover

Pop artists Peter Blake and Jann Haworth designed the album cover for Sgt. Pepper. Blake recalled of the concept: "I offered the idea that if they had just played a concert in the park, the cover could be a photograph of the group just after the concert with the crowd who had just watched the concert, watching them." He added, "If we did this by using cardboard cut-outs, it could be a magical crowd of whomever they wanted." According to McCartney, he himself provided the ink drawing on which Blake and Haworth based the design. (Note: Blake said that Haworth conceived the idea to present the crowd as an imaginary audience. McCartney's original idea, according to Blake, was for the Beatles to pose in an Edwardian-era drawing room in front of a wall filled with portraits of their heroes.) The Sgt. Pepper cover was art-directed by Robert Fraser and photographed by Michael Cooper.

The front of the LP includes a colourful collage featuring the Beatles in costume as Sgt. Pepper's Lonely Hearts Club Band, standing with a group of life-sized cardboard cut-outs of famous people. Each of the Beatles sports a heavy moustache, after Harrison had first grown one as a disguise during his visit to India. The moustaches reflected the growing influence of hippie style trends, while the group's clothing, in Gould's description, "spoofed the vogue in Britain for military fashions". The centre of the cover depicts the Beatles standing behind a bass drum on which fairground artist Joe Ephgrave painted the words of the album's title. In front of the drum is an arrangement of flowers that spell out "Beatles". The group are dressed in satin day-glo-coloured military-style uniforms that were manufactured by the London theatrical costumer M. Berman Ltd. Next to the Beatles are wax sculptures of the band members in their suits and moptop haircuts from the Beatlemania era, borrowed from Madame Tussauds. Amid the greenery are figurines of the Eastern deities Buddha and Lakshmi.

The cover collage includes 57 photographs and nine waxworks. Author Ian Inglis views the tableau "as a guidebook to the cultural topography of the decade" that conveyed the increasing democratisation of society whereby "traditional barriers between 'high' and 'low' culture were being eroded", while Case cites it as the most explicit demonstration of pop culture's "continuity with the avant-gardes of yesteryear". (Note: Inglis is paraphrasing George Melly, who in 1970 described the Sgt. Pepper cover as "a microcosm of the Underground world".) The final grouping included Stockhausen and Carroll, along with singers such as Bob Dylan and Bobby Breen; film stars Marlon Brando, Tyrone Power, Tony Curtis, Marlene Dietrich, Mae West and Marilyn Monroe; artist Aubrey Beardsley; boxer Sonny Liston and footballer Albert Stubbins. Also included were comedians Stan Laurel and Oliver Hardy; writers H. G. Wells, Oscar Wilde and Dylan Thomas; and the philosophers and scientists Karl Marx, Albert Einstein, Sigmund Freud and Carl Jung. Harrison chose the Self-Realization Fellowship gurus Mahavatar Babaji, Lahiri Mahasaya, Sri Yukteswar and Paramahansa Yogananda. The Rolling Stones are represented by a doll wearing a shirt emblazoned with a message of welcome to the band. A photograph of late member Stuart Sutcliffe was included as a homage.

Fearing controversy, EMI rejected Lennon's request for images of Adolf Hitler and Jesus Christ and Harrison's for Mahatma Gandhi. When McCartney was asked why the Beatles did not include Elvis Presley among the musical artists, he replied: "Elvis was too important and too far above the rest even to mention." Starr was the only Beatle who offered no suggestions for the collage, telling Blake, "Whatever the others say is fine by me." The final cost for the cover art was nearly £3,000 (equivalent to £48,000 in 2025), an extravagant sum for a time when album covers would typically cost around £50 (equivalent to £800 in 2025).

=== Back cover, gatefold and cut-outs ===
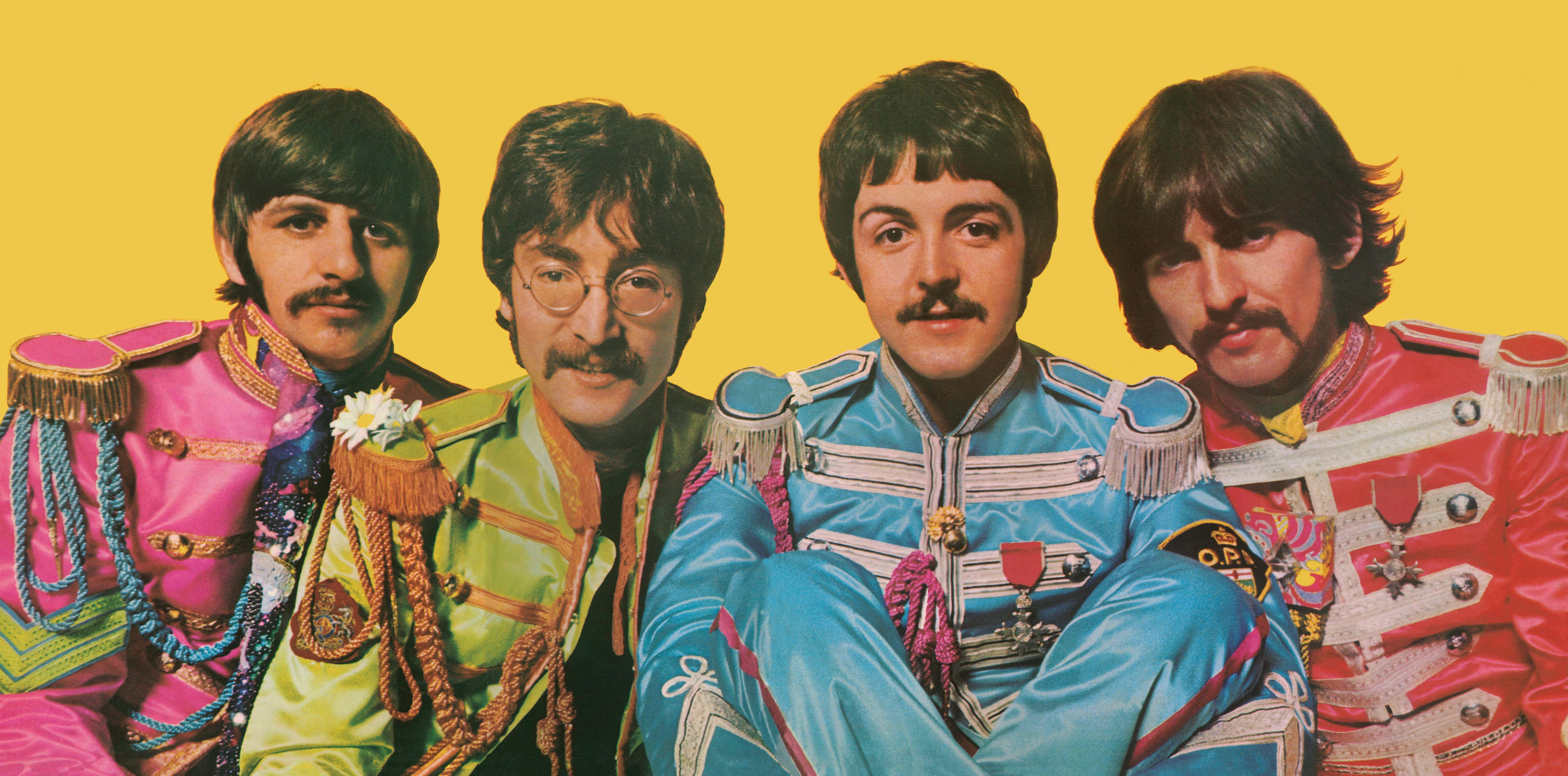
Sgt. Pepper's inner gatefold. McCartney (in blue) wears a badge on his left sleeve that bears the initials O.P.P. McCartney acquired the badge when the Beatles were on tour in Canada; the initials stand for "Ontario Provincial Police". (Note: The Sgt. Pepper cover piqued a frenzy of analysis. Inglis cites it as the only example in popular music where the album art attracted as much attention as the album. He notes several elements of the cover that were interpreted as evidence of McCartney's death, including: the Beatles are supposedly standing about a grave, the hand above McCartney's head is regarded as a "symbol of death", and on the back cover, he is turned away from the camera.)

The 30 March 1967 photo session with Cooper also produced the back cover and the inside gatefold, which Inglis describes as conveying "an obvious and immediate warmth ... which distances it from the sterility and artifice typical of such images". McCartney recalled the inner-gatefold image as an example of the Beatles' interest in "eye messages", adding: "So with Michael Cooper's inside photo, we all said, 'Now look into this camera and really say I love you! Really try and feel love; really give love through this!' ... [And] if you look at it you'll see the big effort from the eyes." In Lennon's description, Cooper's photos of the band showed "two people who are flying [on drugs], and two who aren't".

The album's lyrics were printed in full on the back cover, the first time this had been done on a rock LP. The record's inner sleeve featured artwork by the Dutch design team the Fool that eschewed for the first time the standard white paper in favour of an abstract pattern of waves of maroon, red, pink and white. (Note: The Fool also submitted a design for the LP cover, but the Beatles rejected it.) Included as a bonus gift was a sheet of cardboard cut-outs designed by Blake and Haworth. These consisted of a postcard-sized portrait of Sgt. Pepper (probably based on a photograph of British Army officer James Melville Babington, but also noted as being similar to a statue from Lennon's house that was used on the front cover), a fake moustache, two sets of sergeant stripes, two lapel badges, and a stand-up cut-out of the band in their satin uniforms. Moore writes that the inclusion of these items helped fans "pretend to be in the band".

== Release ==
=== Radio previews and launch party ===
The album was previewed on the pirate radio station Radio London on 12 May and officially on the BBC Light Programme's show Where It's At, by Kenny Everett, on 20 May. Everett played the entire album apart from "A Day in the Life". The day before Everett's broadcast, Epstein hosted a launch party for music journalists and disc jockeys at his house in Belgravia in central London. The event was a new initiative in pop promotion and furthered the significance of the album's release. Melody Maker's reporter described it as the first "listen-in" and typical of the Beatles' penchant for innovation.

The Beatles at the Sgt. Pepper launch party, held at Brian Epstein's house on 19 May 1967

The party marked the band's first group interaction with the press in close to a year. Norrie Drummond of the NME wrote that they had been "virtually incommunicado" over that time, leading a national newspaper to complain that the band were "contemplative, secretive and exclusive". Some of the journalists present were shocked by the Beatles' appearance, particularly that of Lennon and Harrison, as the band members' bohemian attire contrasted sharply with their former image. Music journalist Ray Coleman recalled that Lennon looked "haggard, old, ill" and clearly under the influence of drugs. Biographer Howard Sounes likens the Beatles' presence to a gathering of the British royal family and highlights a photo from the event that shows Lennon shaking McCartney's hand "in an exaggeratedly congratulatory way, throwing his head back in sarcastic laughter".

Sgt. Pepper was given a rush-release in the UK on 26 May, ahead of the scheduled date of 1 June. The band's eighth LP, it was the first Beatles album where the track listings were exactly the same for the UK and US versions. The US release took place on 2 June. Capitol Records' advertising for the album emphasised that the Beatles and Sgt. Pepper's band were one and the same.

=== Public reaction ===
Sgt. Pepper was widely perceived by listeners as the soundtrack to the Summer of Love, during a year that author Peter Lavezzoli calls "a watershed moment in the West when the search for higher consciousness and an alternative world view had reached critical mass". Rolling Stone magazine's Langdon Winner recalled:

The closest Western Civilization has come to unity since the Congress of Vienna in 1815 was the week the Sgt. Pepper album was released. In every city in Europe and America the radio stations played [it] ... and everyone listened ... For a brief while the irreparable fragmented consciousness of the West was unified, at least in the minds of the young.

According to Riley, the album "drew people together through the common experience of pop on a larger scale than ever before". In MacDonald's description, an "almost religious awe surrounded the LP"; he says that its impact was cross-generational, as "Young and old alike were entranced", and era-defining, in that the "psychic shiver" it inspired across the world was "nothing less than a cinematic dissolve from one Zeitgeist to another". In his view, Sgt. Pepper conveyed the psychedelic experience so effectively to listeners unfamiliar with hallucinogenic drugs that "If such a thing as a cultural 'contact high' is possible, it happened here." (Note: MacDonald cites EMI chairman Joseph Lockwood's recollection of attending a dinner party where "rich older women" sat on the floor and began singing the album's songs, and the description of Jefferson Airplane guitarist Paul Kantner of how he and Crosby played the LP all night in a Seattle hotel lobby to around a hundred entranced fans. Kantner later said: "Something enveloped the whole world at that time and it just exploded into a renaissance.") Music journalist Mark Ellen, a teenager in 1967, recalls listening to part of the album at a friend's house and then hearing the rest playing at the next house he visited as if the record was emanating communally from "one giant Dansette". He says the most remarkable thing was its acceptance by adults who had turned against the Beatles when they became "gaunt and enigmatic", and how the group, recast as polished "masters of ceremony", were now "the very family favourites they'd sought to satirise". (Note: Miles recalls hearing the album playing from "every shop" along King's Road and that it was similarly ubiquitous in the most fashionable areas of New York. He remembers the record as "the soundtrack to that summer, and that winter ... You just could not get away from it.")

Writing in his book Electric Shock, Peter Doggett describes Sgt. Pepper as "the biggest pop happening" to take place between the Beatles' debut on American television in February 1964 and Lennon's murder in December 1980, while Norman writes: "A whole generation, still used to happy landmarks through life, would always remember exactly when and where they first played it ..." The album's impact was felt at the Monterey International Pop Festival, the second event in the Summer of Love, organised by Taylor and held over 16–18 June in county fairgrounds south of San Francisco. Sgt. Pepper was played in kiosks and stands there, and festival staff wore badges carrying Lennon's lyric "A splendid time is guaranteed for all".

American radio stations interrupted their regular scheduling, playing the album virtually non-stop, often from start to finish. Emphasising its identity as a self-contained work, none of the songs were issued as singles at the time or available on spin-off EPs. Instead, the Beatles released "All You Need Is Love" as a single in July, after performing the song on the Our World satellite broadcast on 25 June before an audience estimated at 400 million. According to sociomusicologist Simon Frith, the international broadcast served to confirm "the Beatles' evangelical role" amid the public's embrace of Sgt. Pepper. In the UK, Our World also quelled the furore that followed McCartney's repeated admission in mid-June that he had taken LSD. In Norman's description, this admission was indicative of how "invulnerable" McCartney felt after Sgt. Pepper; it made the band's drug-taking public knowledge and confirmed the link between the album and drugs. (Note: Although suspicious of McCartney's motives, Lennon and Harrison, together with Epstein, demonstrated their support by announcing that they too had taken LSD. In July, all four Beatles added their signatures to a petition demanding the legalisation of marijuana and paid for its publication in a full-page ad in The Times.)

=== Commercial performance ===
Sgt. Pepper topped the Record Retailer albums chart (now the UK Albums Chart) for 23 consecutive weeks from 10 June, with a further four weeks at number one in the period through to February 1968. The record sold 250,000 copies in the UK during its first seven days on sale there. (Note: On 4 June, the Jimi Hendrix Experience opened a show at London's Saville Theatre with their rendition of "Sgt. Pepper". Epstein leased the Saville at the time, and Harrison and McCartney attended the performance. McCartney described the moment: "The curtains flew back and [Hendrix] came walking forward playing 'Sgt. Pepper' ... I put that down as one of the great honours of my career.") The album held the number one position on the Billboard Top LPs chart in the US for 15 weeks, from 1 July to 13 October 1967, and remained in the top 200 for 113 consecutive weeks. It also topped charts in many other countries.

With 2.5 million copies sold within three months of its release, Sgt. Pepper's initial commercial success exceeded that of all previous Beatles albums. In the UK, it was the best-selling album of 1967 and of the decade. According to figures published in 2009 by former Capitol executive David Kronemyer, further to estimates he gave in MuseWire magazine, the album had sold 2,360,423 copies in the US by 31 December 1967 and 3,372,581 copies by the end of the decade.

== Contemporary critical reception ==
Sgt. Pepper's arrival in late spring 1967 came at a most opportune moment in Western cultural history: mainstream journalism had at last warmed to the idea that the "rock" world ... could produce a lasting masterpiece that transcended the genre's lowly origins, while a new and legitimate niche called "rock journalism" was working up its own head of steam ... [E]veryone wanted the Beatles to succeed – and to lead. The wind was at their back, and they knew it.

— Beatles biographer Robert Rodriguez, 2012

The release of Sgt. Pepper coincided with a period when, with the advent of dedicated rock criticism, commentators sought to recognise artistry in pop music, particularly in the Beatles' work, and identify albums as refined artistic statements. In America, this approach had been heightened by the "Strawberry Fields Forever" / "Penny Lane" single, and was also exemplified by Leonard Bernstein's television program Inside Pop: The Rock Revolution, broadcast by CBS in April 1967. Following the release of the Beatles' single, in author Bernard Gendron's description, a "discursive frenzy" ensued as Time, Newsweek and other publications from the cultural mainstream increasingly voiced their "ecstatic approbation toward the Beatles".

The vast majority of contemporary reviews of Sgt. Pepper were positive, with the album receiving widespread critical acclaim. Schaffner said that the consensus was aptly summed up by Tom Phillips in The Village Voice, when he called the LP "the most ambitious and most successful record album ever issued". Among Britain's pop press, Peter Jones of Record Mirror said the album was "clever and brilliant, from raucous to poignant and back again", while Disc and Music Echo's reviewer called it "a beautiful and potent record, unique, clever, and stunning". In The Times, William Mann described Sgt. Pepper as a "pop music master-class" and commented that, so considerable were its musical advances, "the only track that would have been conceivable in pop songs five years ago" was "With a Little Help from My Friends". Having been among the first British critics to fully appreciate Revolver, Peter Clayton of Gramophone magazine said that the new album was "like nearly everything the Beatles do, bizarre, wonderful, perverse, beautiful, exciting, provocative, exasperating, compassionate and mocking". He found "plenty of electronic gimmickry on the record" before concluding: "but that isn't the heart of the thing. It's the combination of imagination, cheek and skill that make this such a rewarding LP." Wilfrid Mellers, in his review for New Statesman, praised the album's elevation of pop music to the level of fine art, while Kenneth Tynan, The Times' theatre critic, said it represented "a decisive moment in the history of Western civilisation". Newsweek's Jack Kroll called Sgt. Pepper a "masterpiece" and compared its lyrics with literary works by Edith Sitwell, Harold Pinter and T. S. Eliot, particularly "A Day in the Life", which he likened to Eliot's The Waste Land. The New Yorker paired the Beatles with Duke Ellington, as artists who operated "in that special territory where entertainment slips into art".

One of the few well-known American rock critics at the time, and another early champion of Revolver, Richard Goldstein wrote a scathing review in The New York Times. He characterised Sgt. Pepper as a "spoiled child" and "an album of special effects, dazzling but ultimately fraudulent", and was critical of the Beatles for sacrificing their authenticity to become "cloistered composers". Although he admired "A Day in the Life", comparing it to a work by Richard Wagner, Goldstein said that the songs lacked lyrical substance such that "tone overtakes meaning", an aesthetic he blamed on "posturing and put-on" in the form of production effects such as echo and reverb. As a near-lone voice of dissent, he was widely castigated for his views. (Note: According to Moore, Goldstein's position was an exception among a group of primarily positive contemporary reviewers that he characterises as the most for any single album at the time. He adds that some negative letters were sent to Melody Maker that he speculates were written by jazz enthusiasts.) Four days later, The Village Voice, where Goldstein had become a celebrated columnist since 1966, reacted to the "hornet's nest" of complaints, by publishing Phillips' highly favourable review. According to Schaffner, Goldstein was "kept busy for months" justifying his opinions, which included writing a defence of his review, for the Voice, in July. (Note: In this piece, Goldstein explained that, although the album was not on-par with the best of the Beatles' previous work, he considered it "better than 80 per cent of the music around". He also said that, underneath the production when "the compositions are stripped to their musical and lyrical essentials", the LP was shown to be "an elaboration without improvement" on the group's music.)

Among the commentators who responded to Goldstein's critique, composer Ned Rorem, writing in The New York Review of Books, credited the Beatles with possessing a "magic of genius" akin to Mozart and characterised Sgt. Pepper as a harbinger of a "golden Renaissance of Song". Time quoted musicologists and avant-garde composers who equated the standard of the Beatles' songwriting to Schubert and Schumann, and located the band's work to electronic music; the magazine concluded that the album was "a historic departure in the progress of music – any music". Literary critic Richard Poirier wrote a laudatory appreciation of the Beatles in the journal Partisan Review and said that "listening to the Sgt. Pepper album one thinks not simply of the history of popular music but the history of this century." In his December 1967 column for Esquire, Robert Christgau described Sgt. Pepper as "a consolidation, more intricate than Revolver but not more substantial". He suggested that Goldstein had fallen "victim to overanticipation", identifying his primary error as "allow[ing] all the filters and reverbs and orchestral effects and overdubs to deafen him to the stuff underneath, which was pretty nice".

== Sociocultural influence ==
=== Contemporary youth and counterculture ===
In the wake of Sgt. Pepper, the underground and mainstream press widely publicised the Beatles as leaders of youth culture, as well as "lifestyle revolutionaries". In Moore's description, the album "seems to have spoken (in a way no other has) for its generation". An educator referenced in a July 1967 New York Times article was reported to have said on the topic of music studies and its relevance to the day's youth: "If you want to know what youths are thinking and feeling ... you cannot find anyone who speaks for them or to them more clearly than the Beatles."

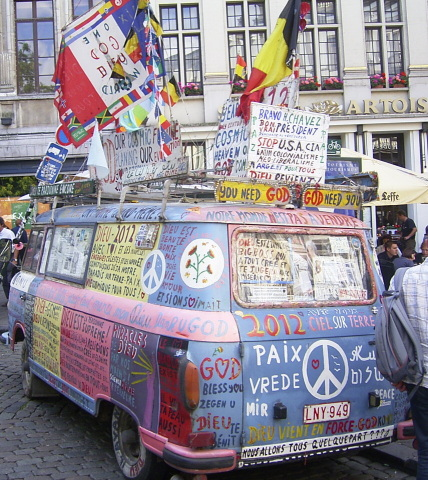
A hippie "flower power" bus (pictured in 2004). Sgt. Pepper conveyed the flower power ideology of 1967.

Sgt. Pepper was the focus of much celebration by the counterculture. American Beat poet Allen Ginsberg said of the album: "After the apocalypse of Hitler and the apocalypse of the Bomb, there was here an exclamation of joy, the rediscovery of joy and what it is to be alive." The American psychologist and counterculture figure Timothy Leary labelled the Beatles "avatars of the new world order" and said that the LP "gave a voice to the feeling that the old ways were over" by stressing the need for cultural change based on a peaceful agenda. (Note: In his 1968 autobiography, High Priest, Leary adapted lyrics from Sgt. Pepper to relate his psychedelic experiences and journey towards higher consciousness.) According to author Michael Frontani, the Beatles "legitimiz[ed] the lifestyle of the counterculture", just as they did popular music, and formed the basis of Jann Wenner's scope on these issues when launching Rolling Stone magazine in late 1967. Further to Lennon wearing an Afghan sheepskin coat at the album launch party, "Afghans" became a popular garment among hippies, and Westerners increasingly sought out the coats on the hippie trail in Afghanistan.

McCartney's LSD admission formalised the link between rock music and drugs, and attracted scorn from American religious leaders and conservatives. Vice president Spiro Agnew contended that the "friends" referred to in "With a Little Help from My Friends" were "assorted drugs". As part of an escalating national debate that triggered an investigation by the US Congress, he launched a campaign in 1970 to address the issue of American youth being "brainwashed" into taking drugs through the music of the Beatles and other rock artists. In the UK, according to historian David Simonelli, the album's obvious drug allusions inspired a hierarchy within the youth movement for the first time, based on listeners' ability to "get" psychedelia and align with the elite notion of Romantic artistry. (Note: In August 1967, The Beatles Book published an article discussing whether the album was "too advanced for the average pop fan". One reader complained that all the songs except "Sgt. Pepper" and "When I'm Sixty-Four" were "over our heads", adding, "The Beatles ought to stop being so clever and give us tunes we can enjoy.") Harrison was eager to separate the message of "Within You Without You" from the LSD experience, telling an interviewer: "It's nothing to do with pills ... It's just in your own head, the realisation."

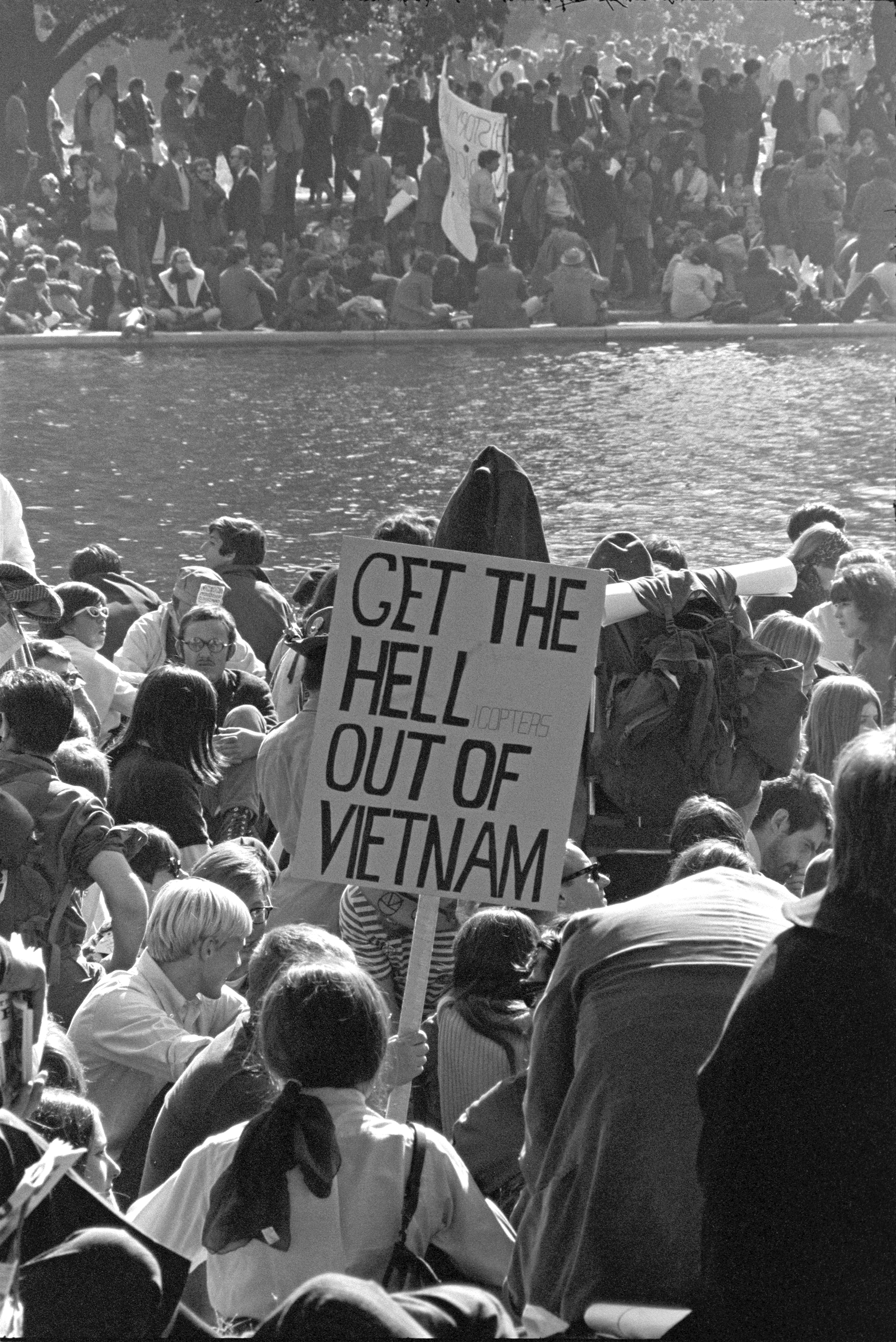
The album resonated with Vietnam War protestors at the 1967 March on the Pentagon.

The Beatles' presentation as Sgt. Pepper's band resonated at a time when many young people in the UK and the US were seeking to redefine their own identity and were drawn to communities that espoused the transformational power of mind-altering drugs. In the Haight-Ashbury district of San Francisco, the recognised centre of the counterculture, Sgt. Pepper was viewed as a "code for life", according to music journalist Alan Clayson, with street people such as the Merry Band of Pranksters offering "Beatle readings". American social activist Abbie Hoffman credited the album as his inspiration for staging the attempted levitation of the Pentagon during the Mobe's anti-Vietnam War rally in October 1967. The Byrds' David Crosby later expressed surprise that by 1970 the album's powerful sentiments had not been enough to stop the Vietnam War.

Sgt. Pepper informed Frank Zappa's parody of the counterculture and flower power on the Mothers of Invention's 1968 album We're Only in It for the Money. By 1968, according to music critic Greil Marcus, Sgt. Pepper appeared shallow against the emotional backdrop of the political and social upheavals of American life. Simon Frith, in his overview of 1967 for The History of Rock, said that Sgt. Pepper "defined the year" by conveying the optimism and sense of empowerment at the centre of the youth movement. He added that the Velvet Underground's The Velvet Underground & Nico – an album that contrasted sharply with the Beatles' message by "offer[ing] no escape" – became more relevant in a cultural climate typified by "the Sex Pistols, the new political aggression, the rioting in the streets" during the 1970s. In a 1987 review for Q magazine, Charles Shaar Murray asserted that Sgt. Pepper "remains a central pillar of the mythology and iconography of the late '60s", while Colin Larkin states in his 1989 Encyclopedia of Popular Music: "[it] turned out to be no mere pop album but a cultural icon, embracing the constituent elements of the 60s' youth culture: pop art, garish fashion, drugs, instant mysticism and freedom from parental control."

=== Cultural legitimisation of popular music ===
In The Oxford Encyclopedia of British Literature, Kevin Dettmar writes that Sgt. Pepper achieved "a combination of popular success and critical acclaim unequaled in twentieth-century art ... never before had an aesthetic and technical masterpiece enjoyed such popularity." Through the level of attention it received from the rock press and more culturally elite publications, the album achieved full cultural legitimisation for pop music and recognition for the medium as a genuine art form. Riley says that pop had been due this accreditation "at least as early as A Hard Day's Night" in 1964. He adds that the timing of the album's release and its reception ensured that "Sgt. Pepper has attained the kind of populist adoration that renowned works often assume regardless of their larger significance – it's the Beatles' 'Mona Lisa'." At the 10th Annual Grammy Awards in March 1968, Sgt. Pepper won awards in four categories: Album of the Year; Best Contemporary Album; Best Engineered Recording, Non-Classical; and Best Album Cover, Graphic Arts. Its win in the Album of the Year category marked the first time that a rock LP had received this honour.

Among the recognised composers who helped legitimise the Beatles as serious musicians at the time were Luciano Berio, Aaron Copland, John Cage, Ned Rorem and Leonard Bernstein. According to Rodriguez, an element of exaggeration accompanied some of the acclaim for Sgt. Pepper, with particularly effusive approbation coming from Rorem, Bernstein and Tynan, "as if every critic was seeking to outdo the other for the most lavish embrace of the Beatles' new direction". (Note: In the November 1967 issue of Down Beat magazine, John Gabree complained that the Beatles were being afforded excessive praise by writers that were unfamiliar with rock music and unaware of the advances made by rival acts such as the Mothers of Invention and the Who.) In Gendron's view, the cultural approbation represented American "highbrow" commentators (Rorem and Poirier) looking to establish themselves over their "low-middlebrow" equivalent, after Time and Newsweek had led the way in recognising the Beatles' artistry, and over the new discipline of rock criticism. Gendron describes the discourse as one whereby, during a period that lasted for six months, "highbrow" composers and musicologists "jostl[ed] to pen the definitive effusive appraisal of the Beatles". (Note: Lennon's lyrics to "I Am the Walrus" were purposely nonsensical and intended to confound commentators' analysis of the Beatles' work, particularly interpretations of "Lucy in the Sky with Diamonds". Harrison later said that Sgt. Pepper became both "a milestone and a millstone in music history". In his view, it paled beside the band's previous two albums, since "There's about half the songs I like and the other half I can't stand." Lennon publicly disparaged the album in the years following its release, a turnaround that offended Martin and other studio personnel.)

Aside from the attention afforded the album in literary and scholarly journals, the American jazz magazines Down Beat and Jazz both began to cover rock music for the first time, with the latter changing its name to Jazz & Pop as a result. In addition, following Sgt. Pepper, established American publications such as Vogue, Playboy and the San Francisco Chronicle started discussing rock as art, in terms usually reserved for jazz criticism. Writing for Rolling Stone in 1969, Michael Lydon said that reviewers had had to invent "new criticism" to match pop's musical advances, since: "Writing had to be an appropriate response to the music; in writing about, say, Sgt. Pepper, you had to try to write something as good as Sgt. Pepper. Because, of course, what made that record beautiful was the beautiful response it created in you; if your written response was true to your listening response, the writing would stand on its own as a creation on par with the record."

Through its acceptance by "serious" composers, according to Schaffner, Sgt. Pepper satisfied the ambitions of a staid, middle-age American audience keen to be seen as in tune with young people's tastes, and every major rock LP was subsequently given the same level of critical analysis. In 1977, the LP won Best British Album at the inaugural Brit Awards, held by the BPI to celebrate the best British music of the last 25 years as part of Elizabeth II's Silver Jubilee. When EMI issued the Beatles' catalogue on CD in 1987, Sgt. Pepper was the only album afforded a dedicated release. EMI marketed it as "the most important record ever released on compact disc".

=== Development of popular music ===
==== Industry and market changes ====
[Because of Sgt. Pepper] people then started thinking that you could spend a year making an album and they began to consider an album as a sound composition and not just a musical composition. The idea was gradually forming of a record being a performance in its own right and not just a reproduction of a live performance.

— Producer and EMI engineer Alan Parsons

Julien describes Sgt. Pepper as a "masterpiece of British psychedelia" and says that it represents the "epitome of the transformation of the recording studio into a compositional tool", marking the moment when "popular music entered the era of phonographic composition". Many acts copied the album's psychedelic sounds and imitated its production techniques, resulting in a rapid expansion of the producer's role. In this regard, Lennon and McCartney complained that Martin had received too much attention for his part in the album's creation, so beginning a feeling of resentment by the Beatles towards their longtime producer. (Note: The group were particularly annoyed that Time had referred to Sgt. Pepper as "George Martin's new album". Years later McCartney said: "I mean, we don't mind him helping us ... but it's not his album, folks, you know. And there's got to be a little bitterness over that.")

In 1987, Anthony DeCurtis of Rolling Stone described Sgt. Pepper as the album that "revolutionized rock and roll", while music journalists Andy Greene and Scott Plagenhoef credit it with marking the beginning of the album era. For several years following its release, straightforward rock and roll was supplanted by a growing interest in extended form, and for the first time in the history of the music industry, sales of albums outpaced those of singles. In Gould's description, Sgt. Pepper was "the catalyst for an explosion of mass enthusiasm for album-formatted rock that would revolutionize both the aesthetics and the economics of the record business in ways that far out-stripped the earlier pop explosions triggered by the Elvis phenomenon of 1956 and the Beatlemania phenomenon of 1963". The music industry swiftly grew into a billion-dollar enterprise, although record company executives were blindsided by the appeal of new acts who defied established formulas.

Music critic Greg Kot said that Sgt. Pepper introduced a template not only for creating album-oriented rock but also for consuming it, "with listeners no longer twisting the night away to an assortment of three-minute singles, but losing themselves in a succession of 20-minute album sides, taking a journey led by the artist". In Moore's view, the album was "pivotal" in heralding "the realignment of rock from its working-class roots to its subsequent place on the college circuit", as students increasingly embraced the genre and record companies launched labels targeted towards this new market. As another result of Sgt. Pepper, US record companies no longer altered the content of albums by major British acts such as the Rolling Stones, the Kinks and Donovan, and their LPs were released in the artists' intended configuration.

==== Albums and artistry ====
According to Simonelli, Sgt. Pepper established the standard for rock musicians, particularly British acts, to strive towards in their self-identification as artists rather than pop stars, whereby, as in the Romantic tradition, creative vision dominated at the expense of all commercial concerns. In the US, the album paved the way for British groups such as Pink Floyd and the Incredible String Band, whose work echoed the eclectic, mystical and escapist qualities of Sgt. Pepper.

Following the Beatles' example, many acts spent months in the studio creating their albums, focused on an artistic aesthetic and in the hope of winning critical approval. Among the many LPs influenced by Sgt. Pepper were Jefferson Airplane's After Bathing at Baxter's, the Rolling Stones' Their Satanic Majesties Request and the Moody Blues' Days of Future Passed, all released in 1967; and the Zombies' Odessey and Oracle, the Small Faces' Ogdens' Nut Gone Flake and the Pretty Things' S. F. Sorrow, all issued the following year. All rock albums were subsequently measured against Sgt. Pepper. Discussing Their Satanic Majesties Request, Wenner referred to "the post–Sgt. Pepper trap of trying to put out a 'progressive,' 'significant' and 'different' album, as revolutionary as the Beatles. But it couldn't be done, because only the Beatles can put out an album by the Beatles."

The Guardian viewed the album's effect on Carla Bley as one of the "50 key events in the history of dance music". Bley spent four years crafting her musical response to Sgt. Pepper – the 1971 avant-jazz triple album Escalator Over the Hill – which combined rock, Indo-jazz fusion and chamber jazz. Roger Waters cited Sgt. Pepper as his influence when Pink Floyd created their 1973 album The Dark Side of the Moon, saying: "I learned from Lennon, McCartney and Harrison that it was OK for us to write about our lives and express what we felt ... More than any other record it gave me and my generation permission to branch out and do whatever we wanted." (Note: After listening to Sgt. Pepper, Sandy Denny decided to abandon her solo career as a folk singer and joined the band Fairport Convention. Crosby recalled that whereas previous Beatles releases might have brought out a competitive instinct in him, with Sgt. Pepper "they were so far ahead of everybody ... But it was inspiring; all I wanted to do was approach my music with the same freedom.")

Over subsequent decades, musical acts referred to their major artistic work as "our Sgt. Pepper". In this regard, Mojo magazine recognises Prince's Around the World in a Day (1985), Tears for Fears' The Seeds of Love (1989), The Smashing Pumpkins' Mellon Collie and the Infinite Sadness (1995), Radiohead's OK Computer (1997), Oasis' Be Here Now (1997) and the Flaming Lips' The Soft Bulletin (1999) as albums that "for better or for worse ... would not have existed" without Sgt. Pepper. Writing for Mojo in 2007, John Harris said that the album's influence resonates in the "identity games" of Gnarls Barkley, in the ambitious song cycle of Green Day's 2004 album American Idiot, in the respect afforded adventurous musicians such as Damon Albarn and Wayne Coyne, and particularly in the audience's expectation that foremost artists will "progress" and perhaps "ascend to a watershed point at which influence, experience and ambition cohere into something that just might blow our minds".

==== Stylistic developments ====
Sgt. Pepper was highly influential on bands in the US acid rock (or psychedelic rock) scene. Lavezzoli views it as a key factor in 1967's standing as the "annus mirabilis" for Indian classical music's acceptance in the West, with the genre having been fully absorbed into psychedelic music. (Note: Lavezzoli cites Sgt. Pepper's Grammy for Album of the Year along with wins for Shankar's collaboration with violinist Yehudi Menuhin (West Meets East) and for Duke Ellington (Far East Suite) as the only time that Indian-influenced albums have won in categories encompassing rock, classical music and jazz at the annual Grammy awards.) Sgt. Pepper is commonly recognised as having originated progressive rock, due to the album's self-conscious lyrics, its studio experimentation, and its efforts to expand the barriers of conventional three-minute tracks. In addition to influencing Pink Floyd records such as Atom Heart Mother, it was a source of inspiration for Robert Fripp when he formed King Crimson. The band's 1969 debut In the Court of the Crimson King was intended as a homage to Sgt. Pepper.

MacFarlane writes that, despite concerns regarding its thematic unity, Sgt. Pepper "is widely regarded as the first true concept album in popular music". According to author Martina Elicker, despite earlier examples, it was Sgt. Pepper that familiarised critics and listeners with the notion of a "concept and unified structure underlying a pop album", thus originating the term "concept album". Further to Sgt. Pepper, musicians increasingly explored literary and sociological themes in their concept albums and adopted its anti-establishment sentiments. It also inspired rock opera works such as the Who's double album Tommy and the musical Jesus Christ Superstar.

Author Carys Wyn Jones locates Pet Sounds and Sgt. Pepper as the beginning of art rock. Doyle Greene says that Sgt. Pepper provides a "crucial locus in the assemblage of popular music and avant-garde/experimental music", notwithstanding the Beatles' presentation of the latter within formal song structures. He also says that, although the band are usually viewed as modernists, the album "can be heard as a crucial postmodernist moment", through its incorporation of self-conscious artistry, irony and pastiche, and "arguably marked rock music's entry into postmodernism as opposed to high-modernism". During the 1970s, glam rock acts co-opted the Beatles' use of alter ego personas, including David Bowie when he adopted the guise of Ziggy Stardust.

==== Graphic design ====
Inglis states that almost every account of the significance of Sgt. Pepper emphasises the cover's "unprecedented correspondence between music and art, time and space". The cover helped to elevate album art as a respected topic for critical analysis whereby the "structures and cultures of popular music" could henceforth justify intellectual discourse in a way that – before Sgt. Pepper – would have seemed like "fanciful conceit". He writes: "[The Sgt. Pepper] cover has been regarded as groundbreaking in its visual and aesthetic properties, congratulated for its innovative and imaginative design, credited with providing an early impetus for the expansion of the graphic design industry into popular music, and perceived as largely responsible for the connections between art and pop to be made explicit."

Sgt. Pepper contributed to the popular trend for military-style fashions as adopted by London's boutique shops. Following the LP's release, rock acts afforded cover art greater consideration and increasingly sought to create a thematic link between their album artwork and the record's musical statements. (Note: Due to the alleged clues in its artwork, Sgt. Pepper returned to the Billboard LPs chart in late 1969, at the height of the "Paul is dead" rumours. One contention in this conspiracy theory was that McCartney had been replaced in the Beatles by a man named William Shears Campbell, or Billy Shears.) Riley describes the cover as "one of the best-known works that pop art ever produced", while Norman calls it "the most famous album cover of all time". The Beatles' 1968 self-titled double LP became known as the White Album for its plain white sleeve, which the band chose as a contrast with the wave of psychedelic imagery and album covers inspired by Sgt. Pepper. In the late 1990s, the BBC included the Sgt. Pepper cover in its list of British masterpieces of twentieth-century art and design, placing it ahead of the red telephone box, Mary Quant's miniskirt, and the Mini motorcar.

== Retrospective appraisal ==
Professional ratings
Review scores
Source	Rating
AllMusic	5/5 stars
The Daily Telegraph	5/5 stars
The Encyclopedia of Popular Music	5/5 stars
MusicHound Rock	5/5
Paste	89/100
Pitchfork	10/10
Q	4/5 stars
The Rolling Stone Album Guide	5/5 stars
Sputnikmusic	5/5
The Village Voice	A

Although few critics initially agreed with Richard Goldstein's criticism of the album, many came to appreciate his sentiments by the early 1980s. In his 1979 book Stranded: Rock and Roll for a Desert Island, Greil Marcus described Sgt. Pepper as "playful but contrived" and "a Day-Glo tombstone for its time". Marcus believed that the album "strangled on its own conceits" while being "vindicated by world-wide acclaim". (Note: According to Riley, Rubber Soul and Revolver are "miracles of intuition" that are "greater than the sum of their parts" while in comparison "Sgt. Pepper is tinged with conceit." He describes Sgt. Pepper as "a flawed masterpiece that can only echo the strength of Revolver".) Lester Bangs – the so-called "godfather" of punk rock journalism – wrote in 1981 that "Goldstein was right in his much-vilified review ... predicting that this record had the power to almost singlehandedly destroy rock and roll." He added: "In the sixties rock and roll began to think of itself as an 'art form'. Rock and roll is not an 'art form'; rock and roll is a raw wail from the bottom of the guts."

In a 1976 article for The Village Voice, Christgau revisited the "supposedly epochal Works of Art" from 1967 and found that Sgt. Pepper appeared "bound to a moment" amid the year's culturally important music that had "dated in the sense that it speaks with unusually specific eloquence of a single point in history". Christgau said of the album's "dozen good songs and true", "Perhaps they're too precisely performed, but I'm not going to complain." In his 1981 assessment, Simon Frith described Sgt. Pepper as "the last great pop album, the last LP ambitious to amuse everyone".

It was inevitable that some of the critical assessment of subsequent generations would grumble. Some have griped about the archness of the band-within-a-band concept, the elaborate studio artifice, the dominance of McCartney's songs (routinely but unfairly considered as lightweight and bourgeois), the virtual freezing out of George Harrison ... and the only episodic interest of a perpetually tripping Lennon.

— Chris Ingham, 2006

Once the Beatles' catalogue became available on CD in 1987, a critical consensus formed around Revolver's standing as the band's best work; the White Album also surpassed Sgt. Pepper in many critics' estimation. In his feature article on Sgt. Pepper's 40th anniversary, for Mojo, John Harris said that, such was its "seismic and universal" impact and subsequent identification with 1967, a "fashion for trashing" the album had become commonplace. (Note: In a 1998 Melody Maker poll of pop stars, DJs and journalists, the album was voted the worst ever made, with the magazine's editor, Mark Sutherland, commenting: "This poll shows people are sick and tired of having the Beatles rammed down their throats as the greatest rock band ever. It's time to make way for great new music." One of those polled, musician and journalist John Robb, declared the album "the low water point of rock 'n' roll", highlighting the Beatles' moustaches as indicative of this.) He attributed this to iconoclasm, as successive generations identified the album with baby boomers' retreat into "nostalgia-tinged smugness" during the 1970s, combined with a general distaste for McCartney following Lennon's death. Citing its absence from the NME's best-albums list in 1985 after it had topped the magazine's previous poll, in 1974, Harris wrote:

Though by no means universally degraded ... Sgt. Pepper had taken a protracted beating from which it has perhaps yet to fully recover. Regularly challenged and overtaken in the Best Beatle Album stakes ... it suffered more than any Beatles record from the long fall-out after punk, and even the band's Britpop-era revival mysteriously failed to improve its standing.

Writing in the 2004 edition of The Rolling Stone Album Guide, Rob Sheffield described Sgt. Pepper as "a revelation of how far artists could go in a recording studio with only four tracks, plenty of imagination, and a drug or two", but also "a masterwork of sonics, not songwriting". In his review for Rough Guides, Chris Ingham said that, while the album's detractors typically bemoan McCartney's dominant role, the reliance on studio innovation, and the unconvincing concept, "as long as there are pairs of ears willing to disappear under headphones for forty minutes ... Sgt. Pepper will continue to cast its considerable spell." Among reviews of the 2009 remastered album, Neil McCormick of The Daily Telegraph wrote: "It is impossible to overstate its impact: from a contemporary Sixties perspective it was utterly mind-blowing and original. Looking back from a point when its sonic innovations have been integrated into the mainstream, it remains a wonky, colourful and wildly improbable pop classic, although a little slighter and less cohesive than it may have seemed at the time." Mark Kemp, writing for Paste, said the album was a "blast of avant-rock genius" but also "one of rock's most overrated albums".

According to BBC Music critic Chris Jones, while Sgt. Pepper has long been subsumed under "an avalanche of hyperbole", the album retains an enduring quality "because its sum is greater than its whole ... These guys weren't just recording songs; they were inventing the stuff with which to make this record as they went along." Although the lyrics, particularly McCartney's, were "a far cry from the militancy of their American peers", he continues, "what was revolutionary was the sonic carpet that enveloped the ears and sent the listener spinning into other realms." Stephen Thomas Erlewine of AllMusic considers the album to be a refinement of Revolver's "previously unheard-of level of sophistication and fearless experimentation" and a work that combines a wide range of musical styles yet "Not once does the diversity seem forced". He concludes: "After Sgt. Pepper, there were no rules to follow – rock and pop bands could try anything, for better or worse."

== Legacy ==
=== Further public and critical recognition ===
Sgt. Pepper sustained its immense popularity into the 21st century while breaking numerous sales records. With certified sales of 5.1 million copies in the UK, as of April 2019, Sgt. Pepper is the third-best-selling album in UK chart history and the best-selling studio album there. It is one of the most commercially successful albums in the US, where the RIAA certified sales of 11 million copies in 1997. By 2000, Sgt. Pepper was among the top 20 best-selling albums of all time worldwide. As of 2011, it had sold more than 32 million copies worldwide, making it one of the highest-selling albums of all time.

Sgt. Pepper has topped many "best album" lists. It was voted in first place in Paul Gambaccini's 1978 book Critic's Choice: Top 200 Albums, based on submissions from around 50 British and American critics and broadcasters including Christgau and Marcus, and again in the 1987 edition. In the latter year, it also topped Rolling Stone's list of "The 100 Best Albums of the Last Twenty Years". In 1994, it was ranked first in Colin Larkin's All Time Top 1000 Albums. (Note: In the book's second edition, published four years later, Revolver was ranked first, with Sgt. Pepper second followed by the White Album. In the third edition, published in 2000, Sgt. Pepper was ranked third to Revolver and Radiohead's The Bends.) It was voted best album of all time in the 1998 "Music of the Millennium" poll conducted by HMV and Channel 4, and in the following year's expanded survey, which polled 600,000 people across the UK. Among its appearances in other critics' polls, the album was third in Q's 2004 list "The Music That Changed the World" and fifth in the same magazine's 2005 list "The 40 Greatest Psychedelic Albums of All Time".

In 1993, Sgt. Pepper was inducted into the Grammy Hall of Fame, and ten years later it was one of 50 recordings chosen by the Library of Congress to be added to the National Recording Registry, honouring the work as "culturally, historically, or aesthetically significant". In 2003, Rolling Stone placed it at number one in the magazine's list of the "500 Greatest Albums of All Time", a ranking it retained in the revised list of 2012, and described the album as "the pinnacle of the Beatles' eight years as recording artists". (Note: The editors ranked Pet Sounds second in the list in recognition of its influence on the album. In the liner notes to the 1997 CD reissue of the Beach Boys' album, Martin said: "Without Pet Sounds, Sgt. Pepper never would have happened ... Pepper was an attempt to equal Pet Sounds.") The editors also said that Sgt. Pepper was "the most important rock 'n' roll album ever made", a point to which June Skinner Sawyers adds, in her 2006 collection of essays Read the Beatles: "It has been called the most famous album in the history of popular music. It is certainly among the most written about. It is still being written about." On Rolling Stone's third such list, published in September 2020, Sgt. Pepper appears at number 24.

In 2006, Sgt. Pepper was chosen by Time as one of the 100 best albums of all time. Writing that year, Kevin Dettmar described it as "quite simply, the most important and influential rock-and-roll album ever recorded". It is featured in Chris Smith's 2009 book 101 Albums That Changed Popular Music, where Smith highlights the album among the most "obvious" choices for inclusion due to its continued commercial success, the wealth of imitative works it inspired, and its ongoing recognition as "a defining moment in the history of music". In the NME's 2014 article "25 Albums With the Most Incredible Production", Emily Barker described Sgt. Pepper as "kaleidoscopic" and an "orchestral baroque pop masterpiece the likes of which has rarely been matched since".

In 2017, Pitchfork placed the album at number 28 on its list of the best albums of the 1960s. Staff writer Jeremy D. Larson wrote: "Many of the greatest albums of the '60s looked outside the artist, preserving in amber what was happening in fractious and romantic times. But Sgt. Pepper's reacted more to what was happening in 1967 inside the Beatles, the biggest band in the world. ... But for all of Sgt. Pepper's big conceits, it is still such a massively human accomplishment, the sound of four Liverpool lads embracing the circus only they knew how to conduct."

=== Adaptations, tributes and anniversary projects ===
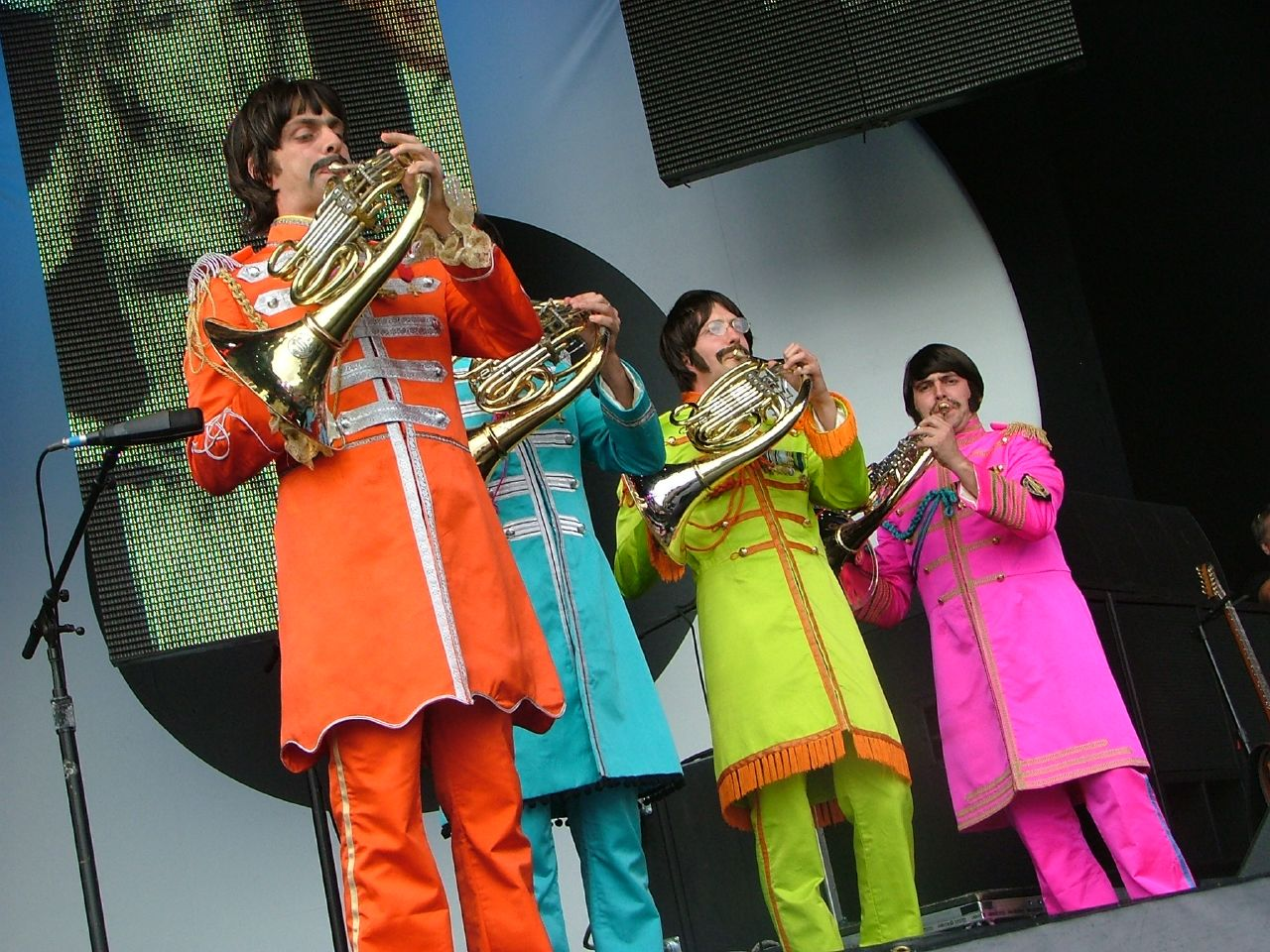
French horn players performing as "Sgt. Pepper's band" at Live 8 London in 2005

The Sgt. Pepper mythology was reimagined for the plot of Yellow Submarine. In the animated film, the Beatles travel to Pepperland and rescue Sgt. Pepper's band from evildoers, the Blue Meanies. The album inspired the 1974 off-Broadway musical Sgt. Pepper's Lonely Hearts Club Band on the Road, directed by Tom O'Horgan, and the 1978 film Sgt. Pepper's Lonely Hearts Club Band, produced by Robert Stigwood. In July 2012, athletes donned Sgt. Pepper uniforms to pay tribute to the Beatles' album during the opening ceremony of the London Olympics.

Sgt. Pepper has been the subject of many tribute albums, including a multi-artist CD available with the March 2007 issue of Mojo and a 2009 live album, Sgt. Pepper Live, by Cheap Trick. Other tribute recordings include Sgt. Pepper Knew My Father, a multi-artist charity compilation released by the NME in 1988; Big Daddy's 1992 album Sgt. Pepper's, which Moore recognises as "the most audacious" of all the interpretations of the Beatles' LP up to 1997; and the Flaming Lips' With a Little Help from My Fwends, released in 2014. BBC Radio 2 broadcast Sgt. Pepper's 40th Anniversary in June 2007. The programme contained new versions of the songs by artists such as Oasis, the Killers and Kaiser Chiefs, produced by Emerick using EMI's original four-track recording equipment.

The 1987 CD release attracted considerable media interest and coincided with a Granada TV documentary, It Was Twenty Years Ago Today, that located the album at the centre of the Summer of Love. The reissue peaked at number three on the UK Albums Chart and topped Billboard's CDs chart. The album's 25th anniversary was observed with The South Bank Show's presentation of Martin's TV documentary The Making of Sgt. Pepper, which included interviews with the three surviving Beatles. (Note: The Making of Sgt. Pepper first aired in the US in September 1992 on the Disney Channel. In keeping with the channel's family image, the band members' comments on the role that drugs played in the album's creation were cut from the broadcast and replaced with alternative footage.) Although there was no official campaign for the 30th anniversary, BBC Radio 2 broadcast Pepper Forever in the UK and some 12,000 schools across the US listened to a radio special dedicated to the album on 2 June 1997. Aside from Radio 2's June 2007 project, the 40th anniversary was marked by the University of Leeds hosting a meeting of British and American commentators to debate the extent of the album's social and cultural impact.

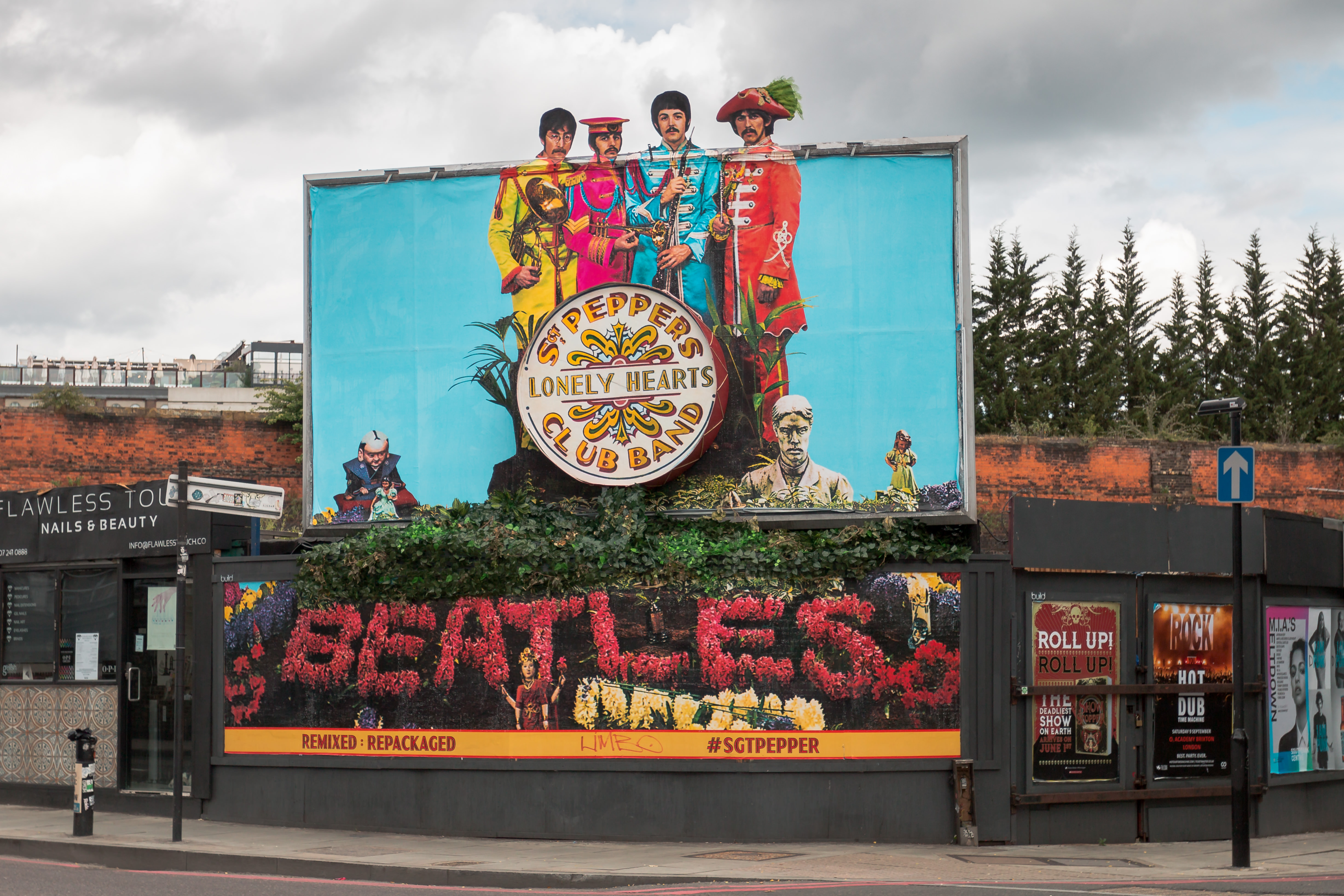
Sgt. Pepper 50th anniversary billboard in London

On 26 May 2017, Sgt. Pepper's Lonely Hearts Club Band was reissued for the album's 50th anniversary as a six-disc box set. The first CD contains a new stereo remix of the album, created by Giles Martin using first-generation tapes rather than their subsequent mixdowns. Apple Corps produced the TV documentary Sgt. Pepper's Musical Revolution to commemorate the anniversary, which was also celebrated with posters, billboards and other decorations in cities around the world. In Liverpool, the anniversary was the focus of a three-week cultural festival that included events dedicated to each of the album's thirteen songs. As part of the festival, Mark Morris choreographed Pepperland to four of the songs from Sgt. Pepper and "Penny Lane", arranged by Ethan Iverson, plus six original compositions by Iverson, and a dawn-to-dusk celebration of Indian music was held in recognition of Harrison's absorption in the genre. The 50th anniversary edition of Sgt. Pepper topped the UK Albums Chart.

== Track listing ==
All songs written by Lennon–McCartney, except "Within You Without You" by George Harrison. Track lengths and lead vocals per Mark Lewisohn and Ian MacDonald.

Side one
No.	Title	Lead vocals	Length
1.	"Sgt. Pepper's Lonely Hearts Club Band"	McCartney	2:00
2.	"With a Little Help from My Friends"	Starr	2:42
3.	"Lucy in the Sky with Diamonds"	Lennon	3:28
4.	"Getting Better"	McCartney	2:48
5.	"Fixing a Hole"	McCartney	2:36
6.	"She's Leaving Home"	McCartney with Lennon	3:25
7.	"Being for the Benefit of Mr. Kite!"	Lennon	2:37
Total length:			19:36

Side two
No.	Title	Lead vocals	Length
1.	"Within You Without You"	Harrison	5:05
2.	"When I'm Sixty-Four"	McCartney	2:37
3.	"Lovely Rita"	McCartney	2:42
4.	"Good Morning Good Morning"	Lennon	2:42
5.	"Sgt. Pepper's Lonely Hearts Club Band (Reprise)"	Lennon, McCartney, Harrison and Starr	1:18
6.	"A Day in the Life"	Lennon with McCartney	5:38
Total length:			20:02

== Personnel ==
According to Mark Lewisohn and Ian MacDonald, except where noted:

=== The Beatles ===
- John Lennon – lead, harmony and background vocals; rhythm, acoustic and lead guitars; Hammond organ, final piano E chord; harmonica, tape loops, sound effects, comb and tissue paper; handclaps, tambourine, maracas, bass guitar on "Fixing a Hole"
- Paul McCartney – lead, harmony and background vocals; bass and lead guitars; piano, grand piano, Lowrey and Hammond organs; handclaps; vocalisations, sound effects, comb and tissue paper
- George Harrison – harmony and background vocals; lead, rhythm and acoustic guitars; sitar, tambura, swarmandal; harmonica, comb and tissue paper; handclaps, tambourine, maracas; lead vocals on "Within You Without You"
- Ringo Starr – drums, congas, tambourine, maracas, handclaps, tubular bells; lead vocals on "With a Little Help from My Friends" and "Sgt. Pepper's Lonely Hearts Club Band (Reprise)"; harmonica, comb and tissue paper; final piano E chord

=== Additional musicians and production ===
- Neil Aspinall – tambura, harmonica
- Geoff Emerick – audio engineering; tape loops, sound effects (Note: Despite Martin's efforts to secure an engineer's credit for Emerick on Sgt. Pepper, EMI refused the request. Emerick was nevertheless the recipient of the 1968 Grammy Award for Best Engineered Album, Non-Classical.)
- Mal Evans – counting, harmonica, alarm clock, final piano E chord
- George Martin – producer, mixer; tape loops, sound effects; harpsichord on "Fixing a Hole", harmonium, Lowrey organ, glockenspiel and Mellotron on "Being for the Benefit of Mr. Kite!", Hammond organ on "With a Little Help from My Friends", piano on "Getting Better", piano solo on "Lovely Rita"; final harmonium chord.
- Session musicians:

- "Sgt. Pepper's Lonely Hearts Club Band" – four French horns: Neill Sanders, James W. Buck, John Burden, Tony Randall, arranged and conducted by Martin and McCartney;
- "She's Leaving Home" – harp, performed by Sheila Bromberg, and string section, arranged by Mike Leander and conducted by Martin;
- "Within You Without You" – tabla by Natwar Soni, dilrubas by Anna Joshi and Amrit Gajjar, and tambura by Buddhadev Kansara, with eight violins and four cellos, arranged and conducted by Harrison and Martin;
- "When I'm Sixty-Four" – clarinet trio: Robert Burns, Henry MacKenzie, Frank Reidy, arranged and conducted by Martin and McCartney;
- "Good Morning Good Morning" – saxophones, trombones, and French horn by Sounds Inc., arranged and conducted by Martin and Lennon;
- "A Day in the Life" – forty-piece orchestra, including strings, brass, woodwinds and percussion, arranged by Martin, Lennon and McCartney, and conducted by Martin and McCartney.

== Charts ==
=== Weekly charts ===
Original release
Chart (1967–70)	Position
Australian Kent Music Report	1
Canadian RPM Top LPs	1
Finnish Albums Chart	1
Norwegian VG-lista Albums	1
Swedish Kvällstoppen Chart	1
UK Record Retailer LPs Chart	1
US Billboard Top LPs	1
West German Musikmarkt LP Hit-Parade	1

1987 reissue
Chart	Position
Dutch Mega Albums Chart	2
Japanese Albums Chart	3
UK Albums Chart	3
US Billboard Top Compact Disks	1

2009 reissue
Chart	Position
Australian Albums Chart	16
Belgian Albums Chart (Wallonia)	22
Brazilian Albums Chart	20
Danish Albums Chart	20
Finnish Albums Chart	9
Italian Albums Chart	9
Japanese Albums Chart	20
New Zealand Albums Chart	12
Norwegian Albums Chart	31
Portuguese Albums Chart	4
Spanish Albums Chart	22
Swedish Albums Chart	8
UK Albums Chart	5

2017 reissue
Chart	Position
Australian Albums (ARIA)	5
Austrian Albums (Ö3 Austria)	3
Belgian Albums (Ultratop Flanders)	2
Belgian Albums (Ultratop Wallonia)	1
Canadian Albums (Billboard)	7
Czech Albums (ČNS IFPI)	6
Danish Albums (Hitlisten)	3
Dutch Albums (Album Top 100)	2
Finnish Albums (Suomen virallinen lista)	23
German Albums (Offizielle Top 100)	5
Irish Albums (IRMA)	2
Italian Albums (FIMI)	6
Japanese Albums (Oricon)	5
Mexican Albums (AMPROFON)	18
New Zealand Albums (RMNZ)	4
Norwegian Albums (VG-lista)	9
Polish Albums (ZPAV)	28
Portuguese Albums Chart	3
Scottish Albums (Official Charts)	1
Spanish Albums (PROMUSICAE)	3
Swedish Albums (Sverigetopplistan)	2
Swiss Albums (Schweizer Hitparade)	2
UK Albums (Official Charts)	1
US Billboard 200	3

=== Year-end charts ===
Chart (1967)	Position
Australian Albums Chart	1
UK Albums Chart	1
US Billboard Year-End	10
Chart (1968)	Position
Australian Albums Chart	3
US Billboard Year-End	6

=== Decade-end charts ===
Chart (1960s)	Position
UK Albums Chart	1

== Certifications and sales ==
Certifications and sales for Sgt. Pepper's Lonely Hearts Club Band
Region	Certification	Certified units/sales
Argentina (CAPIF)	2× Platinum	120,000^{^}
Argentina (CAPIF) 1987 CD issue	3× Platinum	180,000^{^}
Australia (ARIA)	4× Platinum	280,000^{^}
Brazil (Pro-Música Brasil)	Gold	290,000
Canada (Music Canada)	8× Platinum	800,000^{^}
Denmark (IFPI Danmark)	3× Platinum	60,000^{‡}
France (SNEP)	Gold	100,000^{*}
Germany (BVMI)	Platinum	500,000^{^}
Italy (FIMI) sales since 2009	Platinum	50,000^{‡}
Ireland	—	10,000
Japan	—	208,000
New Zealand (RMNZ)	6× Platinum	90,000^{^}
United Kingdom (BPI)	18× Platinum	5,400,000^{‡}
United States (RIAA)	11× Platinum	11,000,000^{^}
Summaries
Worldwide	—	32,000,000
^{*} Sales figures based on certification alone.^{^} Shipments figures based on certification alone.^{‡} Sales+streaming figures based on certification alone.

== See also ==
- Outline of the Beatles
- The Beatles timeline
- The Beatles albums discography

== Bibliography ==
- Babiuk, Andy (2002). Beatles Gear: All the Fab Four's Instruments, from Stage to Studio. San Francisco: Backbeat Books. ISBN 978-0-87930-731-8.
- Badman, Keith (2001). The Beatles Diary Volume 2: After the Break-Up 1970–2001. London: Omnibus Press. ISBN 978-0-7119-8307-6.
- The Beatles (2000). The Beatles Anthology. San Francisco: Chronicle Books. ISBN 0-8118-2684-8.
- Case, George (2010). Out of Our Heads: Rock 'n' Roll Before the Drugs Wore Off. Milwaukee, Wisconsin: Backbeat Books. ISBN 978-0-87930-967-1.
- Christgau, Robert (2006) [December 1967]. "Robert Christgau: 'Secular Music', from Esquire magazine". In Sawyers, June Skinner (ed.). Read the Beatles: Classic and New Writings on the Beatles, Their Legacy, and Why They Still Matter. Penguin Books. ISBN 978-0-14-303732-3.
- Clayson, Alan (2003). George Harrison. London: Sanctuary. ISBN 1-86074-489-3.
- Courrier, Kevin (2009). Artificial Paradise: The Dark Side of the Beatles' Utopian Dream. Westport, Connecticut: Praeger. ISBN 978-0-313-34586-9.
- Covach, John (1997). "Progressive Rock, 'Close to the Edge,' and the Boundaries of Style". In Covach, John; Boone, Graeme M. (eds.). Understanding Rock: Essays in Musical Analysis. New York: Oxford University Press. ISBN 978-0-19-535662-5.
- Cunningham, Mark (1998). Good Vibrations: A History of Record Production. London: Sanctuary. ISBN 978-1-86074-242-2.
- Davies, Hunter (2009) [1968]. The Beatles (Revised and updated ed.). W.W. Norton. ISBN 978-0-393-33874-4.
- Dettmar, Kevin J.H. (2006). "The Beatles". In Kastan, David Scott (ed.). The Oxford Encyclopedia of British Literature. Vol. 1. Oxford University Press. ISBN 978-0-19-516921-8.
- Doggett, Peter (2015). Electric Shock: From the Gramophone to the iPhone – 125 Years of Pop Music. London: The Bodley Head. ISBN 978-1-84792-218-2.
- Elicker, Martina (2001). "Concept Albums: Song Cycles in Popular Music". In Wolf, Werner; Bernhart, Walter (eds.). Essays on the Song Cycle and on Defining the Field. Amsterdam & Atlanta, Georgia: Rodopi. ISBN 978-90-420-1565-4.
- Ellen, Mark (2002). "Sgt Pepper's Lonely Hearts Club Band: The Complete Picture". Mojo Special Limited Edition: 1000 Days That Shook the World (The Psychedelic Beatles – April 1, 1965 to December 26, 1967). London: Emap. pp. 102–105.
- Emerick, Geoff; Massey, Howard (2006). Here, There and Everywhere: My Life Recording the Music of the Beatles. Gotham. ISBN 978-1-59240-269-4.
- Everett, Walter (1999). The Beatles as Musicians: Revolver Through the Anthology. New York: Oxford University Press. ISBN 978-0-19-512941-0.
- Frontani, Michael R. (2007). The Beatles: Image and the Media. Jackson, Mississippi: University Press of Mississippi. ISBN 978-1-57806-966-8.
- Gendron, Bernard (2002). Between Montmartre and the Mudd Club: Popular Music and the Avant-Garde. Chicago: University of Chicago Press. ISBN 978-0-226-28737-9.
- Glausser, Wayne (2011). Cultural Encyclopedia of LSD. MacFarland. ISBN 978-0-7864-4785-5.
- Goldstein, Richard (2006) [18 June 1967]. "We Still Need the Beatles, but ...". In Sawyers, June Skinner (ed.). Read the Beatles: Classic and New Writings on the Beatles, Their Legacy, and Why They Still Matter. Penguin Books. ISBN 978-0-14-303732-3.
- Gould, Jonathan (2007). Can't Buy Me Love: The Beatles, Britain and America (First Paperback ed.). Three Rivers Press. ISBN 978-0-307-35338-2.
- Graff, Gary; Durchholz, Daniel (1999). MusicHound Rock: The Essential Album Guide. Visible Ink Press. ISBN 978-1-57859-061-2.
- Greene, Doyle (2016). Rock, Counterculture and the Avant-Garde, 1966–1970: How the Beatles, Frank Zappa and the Velvet Underground Defined an Era. Jefferson, North Carolina: McFarland. ISBN 978-1-4766-6214-5.
- Hannan, Michael (2008). "The sound design of Sgt. Pepper's Lonely Hearts Club Band". In Julien, Olivier (ed.). Sgt. Pepper and the Beatles: It Was Forty Years Ago Today. Ashgate. ISBN 978-0-7546-6708-7.
- Harris, John (March 2007). "Sgt. Pepper: The Day the World Turned Day-Glo!". Mojo. pp. 72–77, 80–89.
- Harry, Bill (2000). The John Lennon Encyclopedia. Virgin. ISBN 978-0-7535-0404-8.
- Harry, Bill (2002). The Paul McCartney Encyclopedia. Virgin. ISBN 978-0-7535-0716-2.
- Hertsgaard, Mark (1996). A Day in the Life: The Music and Artistry of the Beatles. London: Pan Books. ISBN 0-330-33891-9.
- Hoffmann, Frank W.; Bailey, William G. (1990). Arts & Entertainment Fads. Binghamton, New York: The Haworth Press. ISBN 0-86656-881-6.
- Howard, David N. (2004). Sonic Alchemy: Visionary Music Producers and Their Maverick Recordings. Milwaukee, Wisconsin: Hal Leonard. ISBN 978-0-634-05560-7.
- Ingham, Chris (2006). The Rough Guide to the Beatles (2nd ed.). London: Rough Guides/Penguin. ISBN 978-1-84836-525-4.
- Inglis, Ian (2008). "Cover story: magic, myth, and music". In Julien, Olivier (ed.). Sgt. Pepper and the Beatles: It Was Forty Years Ago Today. Ashgate. ISBN 978-0-7546-6708-7.
- Jones, Carys Wyn (2016) [2008]. The Rock Canon: Canonical Values in the Reception of Rock Albums. Abingdon, UK: Routledge. ISBN 978-0-7546-6244-0.
- Julien, Olivier (2008a). "Preface". In Julien, Olivier (ed.). Sgt. Pepper and the Beatles: It Was Forty Years Ago Today. Ashgate. ISBN 978-0-7546-6708-7.
- Julien, Olivier (2008b). "'Their production will be second to none': An introduction to Sgt. Pepper". In Julien, Olivier (ed.). Sgt. Pepper and the Beatles: It Was Forty Years Ago Today. Ashgate. ISBN 978-0-7546-6708-7.
- Julien, Olivier (2008c). "'A lucky man who made the grade': Sgt. Pepper and the rise of a phonographic tradition in twentieth-century popular music". In Julien, Olivier (ed.). Sgt. Pepper and the Beatles: It Was Forty Years Ago Today. Ashgate. ISBN 978-0-7546-6708-7.
- Kimsey, John (2008). "The Whatchamucallit in the garden: Sgt. Pepper and fables of interference". In Julien, Olivier (ed.). Sgt. Pepper and the Beatles: It Was Forty Years Ago Today. Ashgate. ISBN 978-0-7546-6708-7.
- Larkin, Colin, ed. (2006). The Encyclopedia of Popular Music. London: Oxford University Press. ISBN 978-0-19-531373-4.
- Lavezzoli, Peter (2006). The Dawn of Indian Music in the West. New York: Continuum. ISBN 0-8264-2819-3.
- Lewisohn, Mark (2005) [1988]. The Complete Beatles Recording Sessions: The Official Story of the Abbey Road Years 1962–1970. London: Bounty Books. ISBN 978-0-7537-2545-0.
- Lewisohn, Mark (2010) [1992]. The Complete Beatles Chronicle: The Definitive Day-by-Day Guide to the Beatles' Entire Career. Chicago: Chicago Review Press. ISBN 978-1-56976-534-0.
- MacDonald, Ian (2005). Revolution in the Head: The Beatles' Records and the Sixties (3rd ed.). Chicago Review Press. ISBN 978-1-55652-733-3.
- MacFarlane, Thomas (2008). "Sgt. Pepper's quest for extended form". In Julien, Olivier (ed.). Sgt. Pepper and the Beatles: It Was Forty Years Ago Today. Ashgate. ISBN 978-0-7546-6708-7.
- Mann, William (2006) [29 May 1967]. "The Beatles Revive Hopes of Progress in Pop Music". In Sawyers, June Skinner (ed.). Read the Beatles: Classic and New Writings on the Beatles, Their Legacy, and Why They Still Matter. New York: Penguin Books. ISBN 978-0-14-303732-3.
- Marcus, Greil, ed. (2007). Stranded: Rock and Roll for a Desert Island (2 ed.). Da Capo. ISBN 978-0-306-81532-4.
- Martin, George (1994) [1979]. All You Need is Ears. New York: St. Martin's Press. ISBN 978-0-312-11482-4.
- Martin, George; Pearson, William (1994). Summer of Love: The Making of Sgt. Pepper. Macmillan. ISBN 978-0-333-60398-7.
- Miles, Barry (1997). Paul McCartney: Many Years From Now (1st Hardcover ed.). Henry Holt & Company. ISBN 978-0-8050-5248-0.
- Miles, Barry (2001). The Beatles Diary Volume 1: The Beatles Years. London: Omnibus Press. ISBN 0-7119-8308-9.
- Moore, Allan F. (1997). The Beatles: Sgt. Pepper's Lonely Hearts Club Band. Cambridge University Press. ISBN 978-0-521-57484-6.
- Moore, Allan F. (2008). "The act you've known for all these years: a re-encounter with Sgt. Pepper". In Julien, Olivier (ed.). Sgt. Pepper and the Beatles: It Was Forty Years Ago Today. Ashgate. ISBN 978-0-7546-6708-7.
- Moore, Allan F. (2018) [2001]. Rock: The Primary Text – Developing a Musicology of Rock. Abingdon, UK; New York: Routledge. ISBN 978-1-138-70224-0.
- Nagelberg, Kenneth M. (2001). "Acid Rock". In Browne, Ray B.; Browne, Pat (eds.). The Guide to United States Popular Culture. Madison, Wisconsin: University of Wisconsin Press. ISBN 978-0-87972-821-2.
- Norman, Philip (1996) [1981]. Shout!: The Beatles in Their Generation. New York: Fireside. ISBN 0-684-83067-1.
- Norman, Philip (2008). John Lennon: The Life. New York: Ecco. ISBN 978-0-06-075402-0.
- Norman, Philip (2016). Paul McCartney: The Biography. London: Weidenfeld & Nicolson. ISBN 978-0-297-87075-3.
- Northcutt, William N. (2006). "The Spectacle of Alienation: Death, Loss, and the Crowd in Sgt. Pepper's Lonely Hearts Club Band". In Womack, Kenneth; Davis, Todd F. (eds.). Reading the Beatles: Cultural Studies, Literary Criticism, and the Fab Four. Albany, New York: SUNY Press. ISBN 0-7914-6716-3.
- Philo, Simon (2015). British Invasion: The Crosscurrents of Musical Influence. Lanham, Maryland: Rowman & Littlefield. ISBN 978-0-8108-8626-1.
- Prendergast, Mark (2003). The Ambient Century: From Mahler to Moby – The Evolution of Sound in the Electronic Age. New York: Bloomsbury. ISBN 1-58234-323-3.
- Reck, David (2008). "The Beatles and Indian Music". In Julien, Olivier (ed.). Sgt. Pepper and the Beatles: It Was Forty Years Ago Today. Ashgate. ISBN 978-0-7546-6708-7.
- Reising, Russell; LeBlanc, Jim (2009). "Magical Mystery Tours, and Other Trips: Yellow submarines, newspaper taxis, and the Beatles' psychedelic years". In Womack, Kenneth (ed.). The Cambridge Companion to the Beatles. Cambridge, UK: Cambridge University Press. ISBN 978-0-521-68976-2.
- Riley, Tim (2002) [1988]. Tell Me Why – The Beatles: Album by Album, Song by Song, the Sixties and After. Cambridge, Massachusetts: Da Capo Press. ISBN 978-0-306-81120-3.
- Roberts, Michael James (2014). Tell Tchaikovsky the News: Rock 'n' Roll, the Labor Question, and the Musicians' Union, 1942–1968. Durham, North Carolina: Duke University Press. ISBN 978-0-8223-5475-8.
- Rodriguez, Robert (2012). Revolver: How the Beatles Reimagined Rock 'n' Roll. Milwaukee, Wisconsin: Backbeat Books. ISBN 978-1-61713-009-0.
- Romano, Will (2010). Mountains Come Out of the Sky: The Illustrated History of Prog Rock. Backbeat Books. ISBN 978-1-61713-375-6.
- Romanowski, William D. (2006). Pop Culture Wars: Religion and the Role of Entertainment in American Life. Eugene, Oregon: Wipf and Stock. ISBN 978-1-59752-577-0.
- Scapelliti, Christopher (June 2007). "The Making of Sgt. Pepper: Rock's Big Bang". Guitar World. Vol. 28, no. 6.
- Schaffner, Nicholas (1978). The Beatles Forever. McGraw-Hill. ISBN 0-07-055087-5.
- Sheff, David (1981). Golson, G. Barry (ed.). All We Are Saying: The Last Major Interview with John Lennon and Yoko Ono (2000 ed.). St Martin's Griffin. ISBN 978-0-312-25464-3.
- Sheffield, Rob (2004). "The Beatles". In Brackett, Nathan; with Hoard, Christian (eds.). The New Rolling Stone Album Guide. New York: Simon & Schuster. ISBN 978-0-7432-0169-8.
- Simonelli, David (2013). Working Class Heroes: Rock Music and British Society in the 1960s and 1970s. Lanham, Maryland: Lexington Books. ISBN 978-0-7391-7051-9.
- Smith, Chris (2009). 101 Albums That Changed Popular Music. New York: Oxford University Press. ISBN 978-0-19-537371-4.
- Sounes, Howard (2010). Fab: An Intimate Life of Paul McCartney. London: HarperCollins. ISBN 978-0-00-723705-0.
- Spitz, Bob (2005). The Beatles: The Biography. Little, Brown and Company. ISBN 978-0-7394-6966-8.
- Tillery, Gary (2011). Working Class Mystic: A Spiritual Biography of George Harrison. Quest. ISBN 978-0-8356-0900-5.
- Turner, Steve (2016). Beatles '66: The Revolutionary Year. New York: Ecco. ISBN 978-0-06-247558-9.
- Wagner, Naphtali (2008). "The Beatles' psycheclassical synthesis: psychedelic classicism and classical psychedelia in Sgt. Pepper". In Julien, Olivier (ed.). Sgt. Pepper and the Beatles: It Was Forty Years Ago Today. Ashgate. ISBN 978-0-7546-6708-7.
- Wiener, Allen J. (1992). The Beatles: The Ultimate Recording Guide. Checkmark Books. ISBN 978-0-8160-2511-4.
- Whiteley, Sheila (2008). "'Tangerine trees and marmalade skies': cultural agendas or optimistic escapism?". In Julien, Olivier (ed.). Sgt. Pepper and the Beatles: It Was Forty Years Ago Today. Ashgate. ISBN 978-0-7546-6708-7.
- Winn, John C. (2009). That Magic Feeling: The Beatles' Recorded Legacy, Volume Two, 1966–1970. New York: Three Rivers Press. ISBN 978-0-307-45239-9.
- Womack, Kenneth (2007). Long and Winding Roads: The Evolving Artistry of the Beatles. Continuum. ISBN 978-0-8264-1746-6.
- Womack, Kenneth (2014). The Beatles Encyclopedia: Everything Fab Four. Santa Barbara, California: ABC-CLIO. ISBN 978-0-313-39171-2.
- Womack, Kenneth (2018). Sound Pictures: The Life of Beatles Producer George Martin, The Later Years, 1966–2016. Chicago: Chicago Review Press. ISBN 978-0-912777-77-1.
