= Music of the Millennium =

1999 British nation-wide public survey

Music of the Millennium was a nation-wide public survey conducted in the United Kingdom in 1999 by HMV music stores, in partnership with the Channel 4 television network and Classic FM radio. One of many culture-related surveys leading up to the new millennium, it polled listeners to decide the best music of the previous 1000 years. Around 600,000 people participated in the poll, making it the largest survey on popular music up to that time.

Respondents listed their choice of best artist or work in ten categories. The results were announced on 6 November and presented seven days later on Channel 4's three-hour TV special Music of the Millennium. The Beatles, John Lennon, Elvis Presley, Madonna, Queen, Louis Armstrong, Mozart and Vivaldi each topped categories in the survey.

== Concept and launch ==
HMV launched Music of the Millennium as a marketing venture on 18 January 1999. It followed a similarly titled survey conducted the previous year by HMV and Channel 4 to determine the "greatest album of all time". Concluding on 24 January 1999 and televised as Music of the Millennium – The Final Countdown, the earlier survey attracted 36,000 respondents, all aged between 19 and 45. The Beatles' Sgt. Pepper's Lonely Hearts Club Band topped the poll, ahead of the Stone Roses' self-titled debut album and the Beatles' Revolver. On the Channel 4 TV special, the results were discussed by a panel that included John Peel, Jo Whiley, Bob Geldof, Paul Gambaccini and Justine Frischmann, interspersed with pre-recorded endorsements from individuals such as Fay Weldon, John Cooper Clarke and Loyd Grossman.

For the 1999 poll, the organisers sought to broaden its scope beyond albums and attract a wider range of musical tastes. The survey consisted of ten categories: Most Influential Musician, Best Band, Best Album, Best Songwriter, Best Song, Best Male Singer, Best Female Singer, Best Jazz Musician, Best Piece of Classical Music, and Best Classical Composer. HMV marketing executive Cormac Loughran said that the company hoped the year-long survey would "run like an election", with people eager to ensure recognition for their preferred artists. He likened it to a "social statement" that would demonstrate music's impact on the British people.

When announcing the venture, HMV said it planned to distribute 500,000 voting forms across its 108 stores and produce 25 million shopping bags to serve as additional forms. Classic FM helped publicise the project, while Channel 4 broadcast five-minute segments featuring musicians discussing their favourite artist or piece of music. The first batch of clips included Sinéad O'Connor (discussing Bob Marley), Herbie Hancock (George Gershwin) and Alexander O'Neal (Otis Redding). By July, fifteen of these segments had aired on Channel 4.

Shortly after the launch, Billboard magazine quoted Loughran as saying that 1999 was "going to be a year of lists", in the lead-up to the new millennium, and HMV's aim was to create "the definitive list". He also said that Classic FM's participation would ensure that genres other than pop and rock music would be well represented in the survey. Aside from completing the HMV forms, respondents were able to vote by phone or online at the Channel 4 and Classic FM websites.

== Results ==
Some 600,000 people voted in Music of the Millennium, making it the largest survey on popular music up to that time. The results were announced on 6 November at an event filmed at Elstree Studios in Borehamwood, Hertfordshire. Channel 4 broadcast this event nationally between 9pm and midnight on 13 November. The programme was presented by Richard Blackwood, and Jo Whiley hosted the discussion panel.

The top three in each category were as follows:

- Most Influential Musician: John Lennon; Elvis Presley; Michael Jackson
- Best Band: the Beatles; Queen; the Rolling Stones
- Best Album: the Beatles, Sgt. Pepper's Lonely Hearts Club Band (1967); Michael Jackson, Thriller (1982); the Beatles, Revolver (1966)
- Best Songwriter: John Lennon; Paul McCartney; Bob Dylan
- Best Song: Queen, "Bohemian Rhapsody" (1975); John Lennon, "Imagine" (1971); Robbie Williams, "Angels" (1997)
- Best Male Singer: Elvis Presley; Robbie Williams; Michael Jackson
- Best Female Singer: Madonna; Aretha Franklin; Celine Dion
- Best Jazz Musician: Louis Armstrong; Miles Davis; Ella Fitzgerald
- Best Piece of Classical Music: The Four Seasons – Vivaldi; Planets Suite – Holst; Ninth Symphony – Beethoven
- Best Classical Composer: Wolfgang Amadeus Mozart; Ludwig van Beethoven; Johann Sebastian Bach

== Analysis ==
The Beatles dominated the results, topping the list in four of the ten categories. In the Best Band category, they received 20 per cent of the total votes cast and five times as many votes as the runner-up. By contrast, Queen's win in the Best Song category was achieved with just a 0.5 per cent advantage over the second-place song.

Robbie Williams' prominence in the lists reflected the success he had achieved as a solo artist since leaving the boy band Take That in 1996. The survey also placed him at number 6 in the Most Influential Musician category – ahead of both Mozart and Bach. Commenting on the results in The Guardian, Simon Frith, a film and media studies academic and chairman of the Mercury Prize panel, said Williams' high placings were indicative of his rapid rise to the level of Elton John and George Michael, and of how the poll represented a broad cross-section of ages.

Jonathan Thompson, writing in Independent on Sunday, remarked on the national obsession with list-making throughout 1999, calling it "list mania". He said that the HMV-led poll was among those that "bring fresh, challenging perspectives to the history of the past 1,000 years" by suggesting that "Robbie Williams's contribution to music had been greater than that of Mozart", in the same way that a News of the World poll had placed the boy band Boyzone first in its "Irish Heroes of the Millennium" list.

The NME also questioned the level of recognition afforded Williams and Michael Jackson as artists of influence, and described the overall results as "almost designed to bring on bouts of coronaries in the corridors of the Serious Culture sections of the broadsheets". The writer said that the poll was narrow in its representation of musical genres or any "music that strayed too far from a white middle class middle-aged mainstream". Caroline Sullivan of The Guardian supported Williams' high placings as a songwriter, singer and musical influence, saying that his impact was reflected throughout the contemporary pop scene. She complained that the Beatles, Presley and Queen were perennial favourites but no longer relevant, and, typical of such polls, their voters were "people who buy two records a year".
