= Revolver (Beatles album) =

1966 studio album by the Beatles

Studio album by the Beatles
- Released: 5 August 1966
- Recorded: 6 April – 21 June 1966
- Studios: EMI, London
- Genres: Rock; pop; psychedelia; R&B
- Length: 35:01
- Labels: Parlophone; Capitol
- Producer: George Martin

The Beatles chronology
Rubber Soul (1965)	Revolver (1966)	A Collection of Beatles Oldies (1966)

The Beatles North American chronology
Yesterday and Today (1966)	Revolver (1966)	Sgt. Pepper's Lonely Hearts Club Band (1967)

Singles from Revolver
- 1. "Eleanor Rigby" / "Yellow Submarine" Released: 5 August 1966

Revolver is the seventh studio album by the English rock band the Beatles. It was released on 5 August 1966, accompanied by the double A-side single "Eleanor Rigby" and "Yellow Submarine". The album was the Beatles' final recording project before their retirement as live performers and marked the group's most overt use of studio technology to date, building on the advances of their late 1965 release Rubber Soul. It has since become regarded as one of the greatest and most innovative albums in the history of popular music, with recognition centred on its range of musical styles, diverse sounds and lyrical content.

The Beatles recorded Revolver after taking a three-month break at the start of 1966, and during a period when London was feted as the era's cultural capital. Regarded by some commentators as the start of the group's psychedelic period, the songs reflect their interest in the drug LSD, Eastern philosophy and the avant-garde while addressing themes such as death and transcendence of material concerns. With no plans to reproduce their new material in concert, the band made liberal use of automatic double tracking, varispeed, reversed tapes, close audio miking, and instruments outside of their standard live set-up. Among its tracks are "Tomorrow Never Knows", incorporating heavy Indian drone and a collage of tape loops; "Eleanor Rigby", a song about loneliness featuring a string octet as its only musical backing; and "Love You To", a foray into Hindustani classical music. The sessions also produced a non-album single, "Paperback Writer", backed with "Rain".

In the United Kingdom, the album's 14 tracks were gradually distributed to radio stations in the weeks before its release. In North America, Revolver was reduced to 11 songs by Capitol Records, with the omitted three appearing on the June 1966 LP Yesterday and Today. The release there coincided with the Beatles' final concert tour and the controversy surrounding John Lennon's remark that the band had become "more popular than Jesus". The album topped the Record Retailer chart in the UK for seven weeks and the US Billboard Top LPs list for six weeks. Critical reaction was highly favourable in the UK but less so in the US amid the press's unease at the band's outspokenness on contemporary issues.

Revolver expanded the boundaries of pop music, revolutionised standard practices in studio recording, advanced principles espoused by the 1960s counterculture, and inspired the development of psychedelic rock, electronica, progressive rock and world music. The album cover, designed by Klaus Voormann, combined Aubrey Beardsley-inspired line drawing with photo collage and won the 1967 Grammy Award for Best Album Cover, Graphic Arts. Aided by the 1987 international CD release, which standardised its content to the original Parlophone version, Revolver has surpassed Sgt. Pepper's Lonely Hearts Club Band (1967) in many critics' estimation as the Beatles' best album. It was ranked first in the 1998 and 2000 editions of Colin Larkin's book All Time Top 1000 Albums and third in the 2003 and 2012 editions of Rolling Stone magazine's list of the "500 Greatest Albums of All Time". It has been certified double platinum by the British Phonographic Industry (BPI) and 5× platinum by the Recording Industry Association of America (RIAA). A remixed and expanded edition of the album was released in 2022.

== Background ==
In December 1965, the Beatles' Rubber Soul album was released to wide critical acclaim. According to David Howard, the limits of pop music "had been raised into the stratosphere" by the release, resulting in a shift in focus away from singles to creating albums of consistently high quality. The following January, the Beatles carried out overdubs on live recordings taken from their 1965 US tour, for inclusion in the concert film The Beatles at Shea Stadium. The group's manager, Brian Epstein, had intended that 1966 would then follow the pattern of the previous two years, in terms of the band making a feature film and an accompanying album, followed by concert tours during the summer months. After the Beatles vetoed the proposed film project, the time allocated for filming became a further three months free of professional engagements. This was the longest period the band members had experienced outside the group collective since 1962, and it defied the convention that pop acts should be working almost continually. The group thereby had an unprecedented amount of time to prepare for a new album.

Literally anything [could come out of the next recording sessions]. Electronic music, jokes ... one thing's for sure – the next LP is going to be very different.

— John Lennon, March 1966

Beatles biographer Nicholas Schaffner cites 1966 as the start of the band's "psychedelic period", as do musicologists Russell Reising and Jim LeBlanc. (Note: Alternatively, George Case, writing in his book Out of Our Heads, identifies Rubber Soul as marking "the authentic beginning of the psychedelic era". Among other commentators, Joe Harrington says that the Beatles' first "psychedelic experiments" appear on the 1965 album, and Christopher Bray recognises the Rubber Soul track "The Word" as inaugurating the group's "high psychedelic period".) Schaffner adds: "That adjective [psychedelic] implies not only the influence of certain mind-altering chemicals, but also the freewheeling spectrum of wide-ranging colors that their new music seemed to evoke." Music journalist Carol Clerk describes Revolver as having been "decisively informed by acid", following John Lennon and George Harrison's continued use of the drug LSD since the spring of 1965. (Note: In Lennon's description, Revolver was "the acid album" and Rubber Soul their "pot album".) Through these experiences, the two musicians developed a fascination for Eastern philosophical concepts, particularly regarding the illusory nature of human existence. Despite his bandmates' urging, after Ringo Starr had also partaken of the drug, Paul McCartney refused to try LSD. Intent on self-improvement, McCartney drew inspiration from the intellectual stimulation he experienced among London's arts scene, particularly its thriving avant-garde community. With Barry Miles as his guide, he became immersed in the nascent British counterculture movement, which soon emerged as the underground.

While arranging dates for the band's world tour, Epstein agreed to a proposal by journalist Maureen Cleave for the Beatles to be interviewed separately for a series of articles that would explore each of the band members' personality and lifestyle beyond his identity as a Beatle. The articles were published in weekly instalments in London's Evening Standard newspaper throughout March 1966, and reflected the transformation that was underway during the group's months of inactivity. (Note: According to Shawn Levy, writing in his book on Swinging London, this transformation took place between November 1965 and the following April, when the sessions for Revolver began. He describes the Beatles as "the world's first household psychedelics" and "the first stars of any medium to metamorphose fully and obviously from perky and aboveboard to mysterious and covert".) Of the two principal songwriters, Cleave found Lennon to be intuitive, lazy and dissatisfied with fame and his surroundings in the Surrey countryside, while McCartney conveyed confidence and a hunger for knowledge and new creative possibilities. In his book Revolver: How the Beatles Reimagined Rock 'n' Roll, Robert Rodriguez writes that, whereas Lennon had been the Beatles' dominant creative force before Revolver, McCartney now attained an approximately equal position with him. In a further development, Harrison's interest in the music and culture of India, and his study of the Indian sitar, had inspired him as a composer. According to Ian Inglis, Revolver is widely viewed as "the album on which Harrison came of age as a songwriter".

== Recording ==
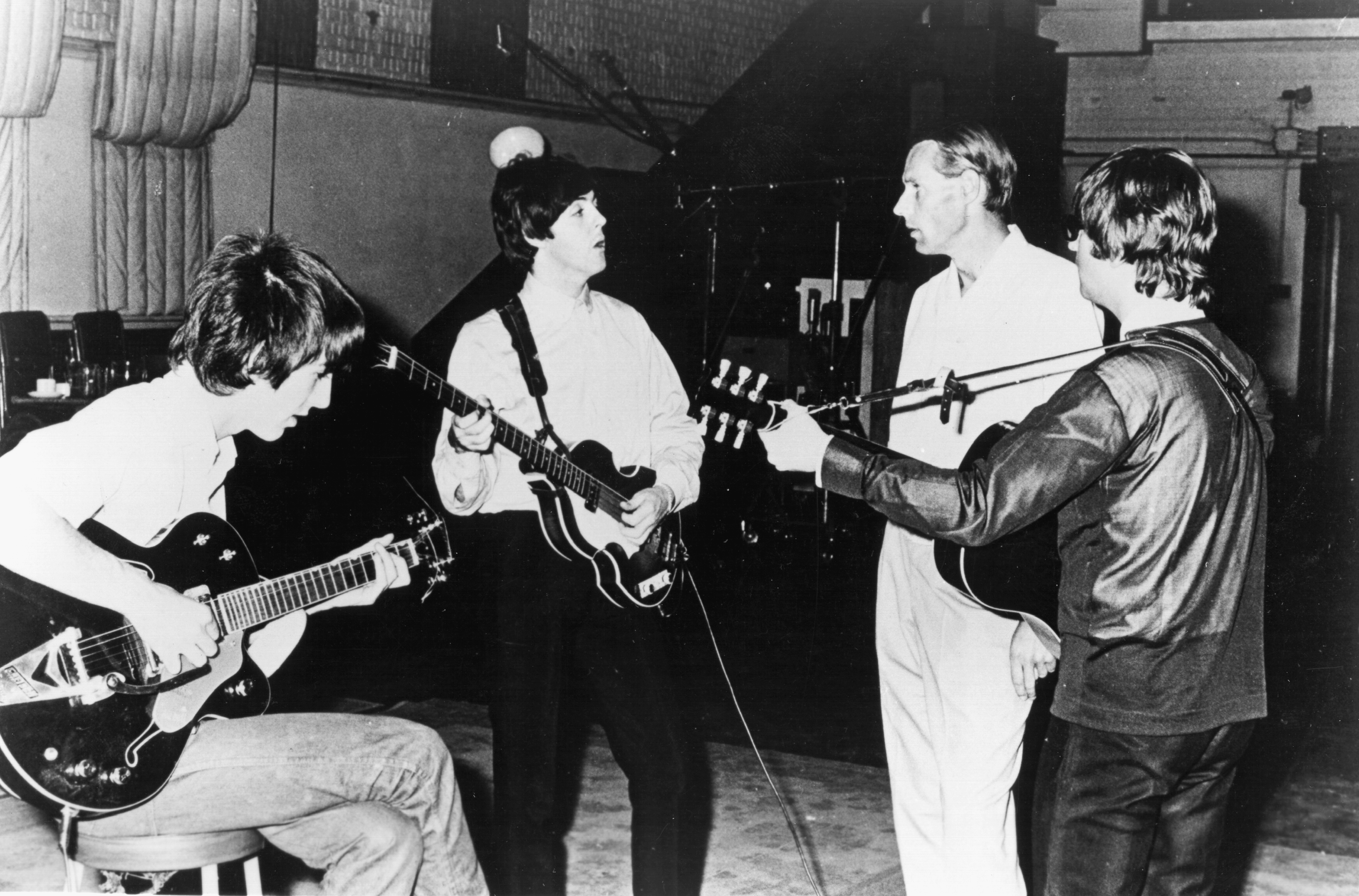
Harrison, McCartney and Lennon with George Martin at EMI Studios, undated

The Beatles had hoped to work in a more modern facility than EMI's London studios at Abbey Road and were impressed with the sound on records created at Stax Studio in Memphis. In March 1966, Epstein investigated the possibility of their recording the new album at Stax, where, according to a letter written by Harrison two months later, the group intended to work with producer Jim Stewart. The idea was abandoned after locals began descending on the Stax building, as were alternative plans to use either Atlantic Studios in New York or Motown's Hitsville USA facility in Detroit. (Note: Rather than security concerns, Harrison's letter cites financial considerations as the obstacle. Steve Cropper, then a member of the Stax house band and studio staff, believed that he would be producing the sessions, based on his conversations with Epstein.)

Recording for the album instead began at EMI Studio 3 in London on 6 April, with George Martin again serving as producer. The first track attempted was Lennon's "Tomorrow Never Knows", the arrangement for which changed considerably between the initial take that day and the subsequent remake. This first version of "Tomorrow Never Knows", along with several other outtakes from the album sessions, was included on the 1996 compilation Anthology 2. Also recorded during the Revolver sessions were "Paperback Writer" and "Rain", which were issued as the A and B-side of a non-album single in late May.

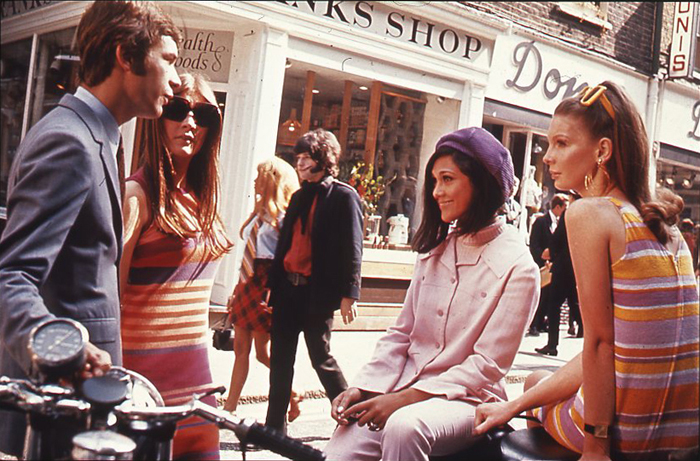
Swinging London, Carnaby Street, c. 1966. The album's creation coincided with international recognition of London's role as a cultural capital. According to Philip Norman, Revolver captured the confidence of summer 1966: "It was hot pavements, open windows, King's Road bistros and England soccer stripes. It was the British accent, once again all-conquering."

The band had worked on ten songs, including both sides of the upcoming single, by 1 May, when they interrupted the sessions to perform at the NME's annual Poll-Winners Concert. (Note: Held at Wembley's Empire Pool, in north-west London, this was the last concert that the Beatles played before a paying audience in the United Kingdom.) At a time when Time magazine dubbed London "the Swinging City", belatedly recognising its ascendance as the era's cultural capital, the Beatles drew inspiration from attending concerts by visiting artists, as well as film premieres, plays and other cultural events. From February through June, these musical acts included Stevie Wonder, Roy Orbison, the Lovin' Spoonful, the Mamas & the Papas, Bob Dylan (with whom they socialised extensively), Luciano Berio and Ravi Shankar. (Note: Among these meetings, Lennon participated in the filming of D.A. Pennebaker's documentary about Dylan's 1966 tour, Eat the Document, on 27 May, while Shankar agreed to become Harrison's sitar teacher on 1 June.) During mid-May, Lennon and McCartney attended a private listening party for the Beach Boys' Pet Sounds album, and McCartney met Italian director Michelangelo Antonioni, who filmed Blowup in London, inspired by the contemporary fashion scene.

On 16 May, Epstein responded to a request from Capitol Records, EMI's North American counterpart, to supply three new songs for an upcoming US release, titled Yesterday and Today. Issued on 20 June, this album combined tracks that Capitol had omitted from the Beatles' previous US releases with songs that the band had originally issued on non-album singles. From the six completed recordings for Revolver, Martin selected three Lennon-written songs, since the sessions had favoured his compositions thus far. Keen to limit the interruption to recording that multiple television appearances would create, the Beatles spent two days making promotional films for the "Paperback Writer" single. The first set of clips was filmed at EMI Studio 1 on 19 May by Michael Lindsay-Hogg, director of the popular TV show Ready Steady Go! The following day, the group shot further clips for the two songs in the grounds of Chiswick House, in west London. In the face of fans' complaints of an aloofness in their new work, however, the band conceded to making a live appearance on Top of the Pops on 16 June.

The camaraderie among the four Beatles was at its highest throughout this period. A disagreement between McCartney and his bandmates nevertheless resulted in McCartney walking out of the studio during the final session, for Lennon's "She Said She Said", on 21 June, two days before the band were due to fly to West Germany for the first leg of their world tour. The Beatles spent over 220 hours recording Revolver – a figure that excludes mixing sessions, and compares with less than 80 hours for Rubber Soul. Final mixing of the album took place on 22 June. The Beatles celebrated the project's completion by attending the opening of Sibylla's, a nightclub in which Harrison had a financial stake.

== Production techniques ==
=== Studio aesthetic ===
Revolver very rapidly became the album where the Beatles would say, "OK, that sounds great, now let's play [the recording] backwards or speeded up or slowed down." They tried everything backwards, just to see what things sounded like.

— EMI recording engineer Geoff Emerick

The sessions for Revolver furthered the spirit of studio experimentation that was evident on Rubber Soul. With the Beatles increasingly involved in the production of their music, Martin's role as producer had changed to one of a facilitator and collaborator, whereby the band now relied on him to make their ideas a reality. (Note: The change in the dynamic between the Beatles and Martin began in 1964. Speaking about his role in 1966, Martin said: "I've changed from being the gaffer to four Herberts from Liverpool to what I am now, clinging on to the last vestiges of recording power.") According to Robert Rodriguez, Revolver marked the first time the Beatles integrated studio technology into the "conception of the recordings they made". He views this approach as reflective of the group's waning interest in live performance before crowds of screaming fans, "in favor of creating soundscapes without limitation" in a studio environment. For the first time at EMI Studios, the company's four-track tape machines were placed in the studio's control room, alongside the producer and balance engineer, rather than in a dedicated machine room. The Beatles' new recording engineer on the project was twenty-year-old Geoff Emerick, whom the critic Ian MacDonald describes as an "English audio experimentalist" in the tradition of Joe Meek. (Note: In the 1950s, Meek had pioneered many recording techniques and had experimented with close-miking, a sound-capture technique favoured by Emerick. Meek's preeminence was usurped by the Beatles and other British rock 'n' roll bands in 1963.) Emerick recalled that no preproduction or rehearsal process took place for Revolver; instead, the band used the studio to create each song from what was often just an outline of a composition. Speaking shortly before the start of the sessions, Lennon said that they had considered making the album a continuous flow of tracks, without gaps to differentiate between each song. (Note: This technique was instead used for the first time on a pop album when the Beatles released their follow-up to Revolver, Sgt. Pepper's Lonely Hearts Club Band. The critic Tim Riley nevertheless identifies the segues from "I'm Only Sleeping" to "Love You To" and "Doctor Robert" to "I Want to Tell You" as anticipating the "continuous stream of sound" achieved on Sgt. Pepper.)

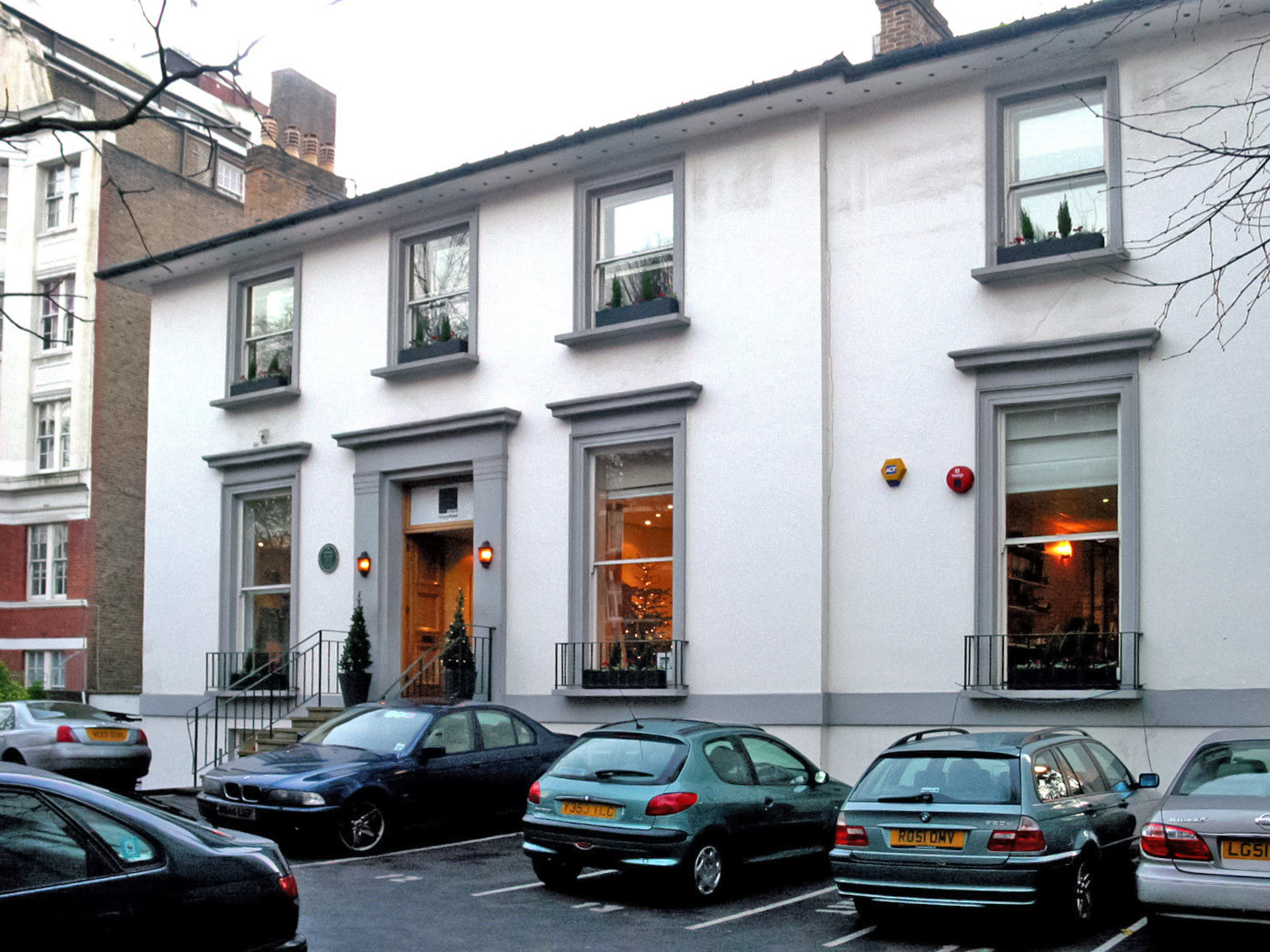
EMI's Abbey Road Studios (pictured in 2005). Most of the sessions for Revolver took place in the complex's intimate Studio 3.

The group's willingness to experiment was also evident in their dedication to finding or inventing sounds that captured the heightened perception they experienced through hallucinogenic drugs. The album made liberal use of compression and tonal equalisation. Emerick said that the Beatles encouraged the studio staff to break from standard recording practices, adding: "It was implanted when we started Revolver that every instrument should sound unlike itself: a piano shouldn't sound like a piano, a guitar shouldn't sound like a guitar."

In their search for new sounds, the band incorporated musical instruments such as the Indian tambura and tabla, and clavichord, vibraphone and tack piano into their work for the first time. The guitar sound on the album was more robust than before, through the use of new Fender amplifiers; the choice of guitars, which included Harrison using a Gibson SG as his preferred instrument; and the introduction of Fairchild 660 limiters for recording. With no expectations of being able to re-create their new music within the confines of their live shows, the Beatles increasingly used outside contributors while making the album. This included the band's first use of a horn section, on "Got to Get You into My Life", and the first time they incorporated sound effects extensively, during a party-style overdubbing session for "Yellow Submarine".

=== Innovations ===
There are sounds [on Revolver] that nobody else has done yet – I mean nobody ... ever.

— Paul McCartney, 1966

Mark Brend writes that, with Revolver, the Beatles advanced Meek's strategy of employing the recording studio as a musical instrument and "formalized this approach into what is now an accepted option for pop music making". A key production technique they used was automatic double tracking (ADT), which EMI technical engineer Ken Townsend invented on 6 April. This technique employed two linked tape recorders to automatically create a doubled vocal track. The standard method had been to double the vocal by singing the same piece twice onto a multitrack tape, a task Lennon particularly disliked. The Beatles were delighted with the invention, and used it extensively on Revolver. ADT soon became a standard pop production technique, and led to related developments such as the artificial chorus effect.

The band's most experimental work during the sessions was channelled into the first song they attempted, "Tomorrow Never Knows". Lennon sang his vocal for the song through the twin revolving speakers inside a Leslie cabinet, which was designed for use with a Hammond organ. The effect was employed throughout the initial take of the song but only during the second half of the remake. According to Andy Babiuk, "Tomorrow Never Knows" marked the first time that a vocal was recorded using a microphone wired into the input of a Leslie speaker. Much of the backing track for the song consists of a series of prepared tape loops, an idea that originated with McCartney and was influenced by the work of avant-garde artists such as Karlheinz Stockhausen who regularly experimented with magnetic tape and musique concrète techniques. The Beatles each prepared loops at home, and a selection of these sounds were then added to the musical backing of "Tomorrow Never Knows". (Note: While Emerick said that McCartney was solely responsible for creating the tape loops, Martin credited all four members of the band. Rodriguez acknowledges McCartney as the initiator, and the likelihood that the other Beatles contributed.) The process was carried out live, with multiple tape recorders running simultaneously, and some of the longer loops extending out of the control room and down the corridor.

The inclusion of reversed tape sounds on "Rain" (specifically, a portion of Lennon's vocal part) marked the first pop release to use this technique, although the Beatles had first used it in some of the tape loops and the overdubbed guitar solo on "Tomorrow Never Knows". The backwards (or backmasked) guitar solo on "I'm Only Sleeping" was similarly unprecedented in pop music, in that Harrison deliberately composed and recorded his guitar parts with a view to how the notes would sound when the tape direction was corrected. Experimentation with backwards sounds was a key aspect of the Revolver sessions, as was the use of the Leslie speaker effect. The band's interest in the tones that resulted from varying tape speed (or varispeeding) extended to recording a basic track at a faster tempo than they intended the song to sound on disc.

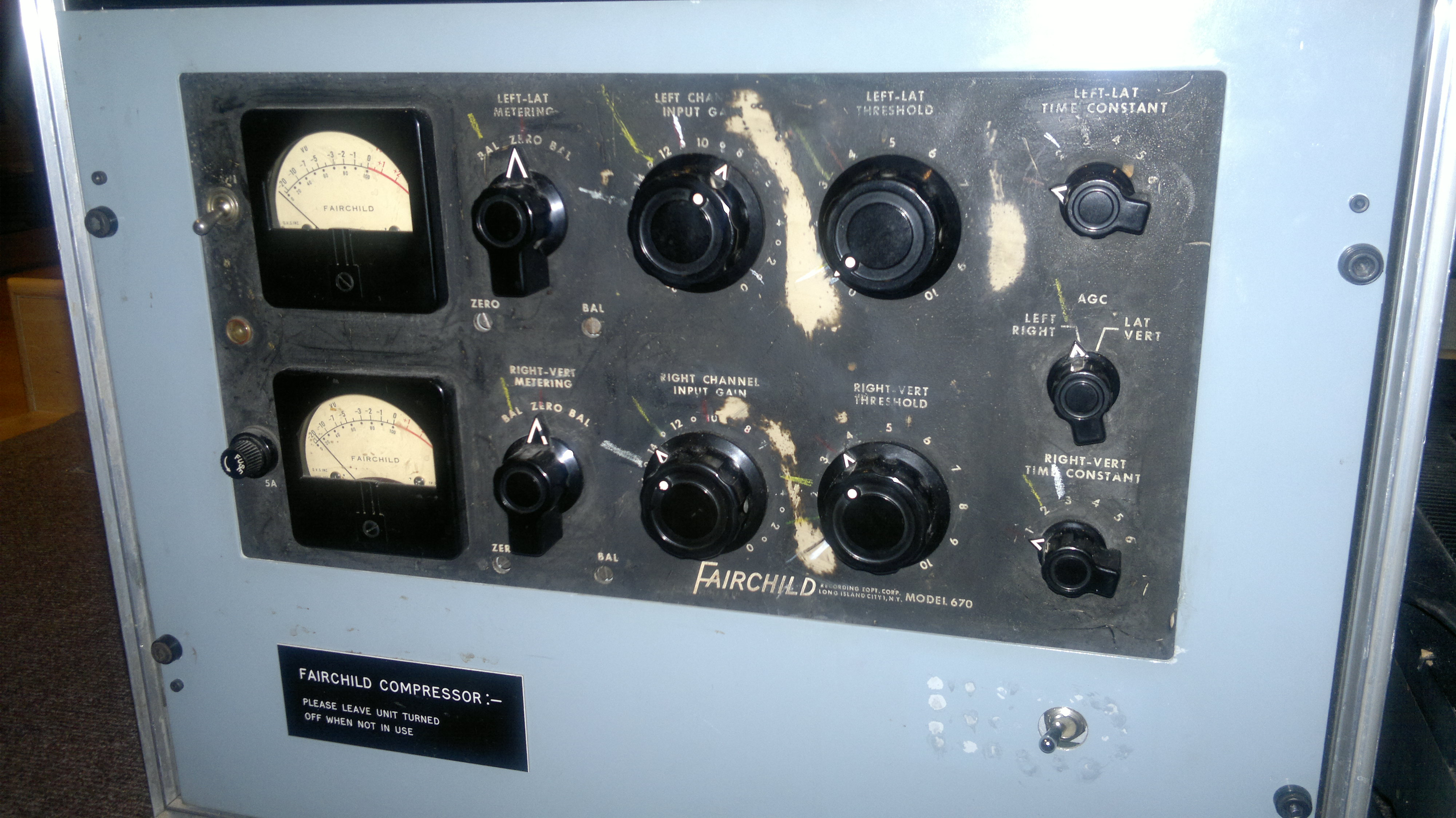
A Fairchild 670 stereo compressor. Fairchild's mono equivalent, the 660, was used extensively during the Revolver sessions and contributed to the robust sounds captured on the album.

During the sessions, Emerick recorded McCartney's bass guitar amplifier via a loudspeaker, which Townsend had reconfigured to serve as a microphone, in order to give the bass more prominence than on previous Beatles releases. Although this particular technique was used only on the two songs selected for the May 1966 single, an enhanced bass sound was a feature of much of the album. Emerick also ensured a greater presence for Starr's bass drum, by inserting an item of clothing inside the structure, to dampen the sound, and then moving the microphone to just 3 inches from the drumhead and compressing the signal through a Fairchild limiter. MacDonald writes that although EMI Studios was technically inferior to many recording facilities in the United States, Starr's drumming on the album soon led to studios there "being torn apart and put back together again", as engineers sought to replicate the innovative sounds achieved by the Beatles. The preference for close-miking instruments extended to the orchestral strings used on "Eleanor Rigby", to achieve McCartney's request for a "really biting" sound, and the horns on "Got to Get You into My Life". This was another break from convention, and alarmed the classically trained string players.

Kevin Ryan and Brian Kehew wrote that the Revolver sessions introduced nine techniques to the recording world, including ADT, backwards recording, and close-miked drums. They quote Emerick as saying: "I know for a fact that, from the day it came out, Revolver changed the way that everyone else made records." (Note: American producer Tony Visconti has cited the album as a work that "showed how the studio could be used as an instrument" and partly inspired his relocation to London in the late 1960s, "to learn how people made records like this".)

== Songs ==
=== Overview ===
Steve Turner writes that Revolver encapsulates not only "the spirit of the times" but the network of progressive social and cultural thinkers in which the Beatles had recently become immersed in London. According to Reising and LeBlanc, along with "Rain", it marks the start of the band's body of work embracing psychedelia, which continued through Sgt. Pepper's Lonely Hearts Club Band, Magical Mystery Tour and the new songs recorded in 1967 for the animated film Yellow Submarine, together with their singles over those two years. The authors view Lennon and Harrison's compositions as the most overtly psychedelic and find the genre's traits evident in the album's instrumentation and soundscapes, and in its lyrical imagery. (Note: Reising and LeBlanc find little psychedelic content in McCartney's "Eleanor Rigby" and "Here, There and Everywhere", but comment that the latter adds to the LP's "atmospheric diversity", which was a key characteristic of psychedelic albums.) Music critic Jim DeRogatis views the LP as an early work in the psychedelic rock genre, which accompanied the emergence of counterculture ideology in the 1960s.

Through its individual tracks, Revolver covers a wide range of styles, including acid rock, chamber music, R&B, raga rock, musique concrète, as well as standard contemporary rock and pop. In Rodriguez's view, the influence of Indian music permeates the album. Aside from the sounds and vocal styling used on much of the recording, this influence is evident in the limited chord changes in some of the songs, suggesting an Indian-style drone. According to cultural historian Simon Philo, Revolver contained "[the] most sustained deployment of Indian instruments, musical form and even religious philosophy" heard in popular music up to that time. Writing for Slate, Jack Hamilton calls the album's music "avante-garde R&B", showcasing the musicians' debt to African-American music.

In its lyrical themes, the album marks a radical departure from the Beatles' past work, as a large majority of the songs avoid the subject of love. According to Reising and LeBlanc, the lyrics on this and the band's later psychedelic records capture the psychedelic culture's belief in the truth-revealing qualities of LSD over the illusions of bourgeois thinking; reject materialism in favour of Asian-inspired spirituality; and explore the overlap in meaning between a "trip" and travelling, resulting in narratives in which time and space become blurred. Where the songs do present as love songs, the authors continue, love is often conveyed as a unifying force among many, rather than between two individuals, or as a "way of life".

Critic Kenneth Womack writes of the Beatles exploring "phenomenologies of consciousness" on Revolver, and he cites as examples "I'm Only Sleeping"'s preoccupation with dreams and the references to death in the lyrics to "Tomorrow Never Knows". In Womack's estimation, the songs represent two important elements of the human life cycle that are "philosophical opposites". Echoing this point, music critic Tim Riley writes that, just as "embracing life means accepting death", the fourteen tracks "link a disillusioned view of the modern world ... with a belief in metaphysical transcendence". Philo finds the Beatles' "countercultural engagement" evident on even the songs that present as standard pop. In Reising's view, all the songs on Revolver are linked, in that each line in "Tomorrow Never Knows", the closing track, is alluded to or explored in the lyrics to one or more of the tracks that precede it.

=== Side one ===
==== "Taxman" ====
The guitar solo from "Taxman"
Womack characterises the solo as "like nothing else in the Beatles' corpus to date; for that matter, it hardly bears any resemblance to anything in the history of recorded music." He credits the track with "announc[ing] a sweeping shift in the essential nature" of the Beatles' sound.

Harrison wrote "Taxman" as a protest against the high marginal tax rates paid by top earners like the Beatles, which, under Harold Wilson's Labour government, amounted to 95 per cent of unearned income (i.e. interest on savings and investments) above the top threshold. (Note: According to MacDonald, this was the "price" the Beatles paid alongside their being appointed MBEs in September 1965. Aside from the financial imposition, Harrison was alarmed that the money was being used to fund the manufacture of military weapons.) The song's spoken count-in is out of tempo with the performance that follows, a device that Riley credits with establishing the "new studio aesthetic of Revolver". Harrison's vocals on the track were treated with heavy compression and ADT. In addition to playing a glissandi-inflected bass part reminiscent of Motown's James Jamerson, McCartney performed the song's guitar solo. The latter section was also edited onto the end of the original recording, ensuring that the track closed with the solo reprised over a fadeout. Rodriguez recognises "Taxman" as the first Beatles song written about "topical concerns"; he also cites its "abrasive sneer" as a precursor to the 1970s punk rock movement. Completed with input from Lennon, the lyrics refer by name to Wilson, who had just been re-elected as prime minister in the 1966 general election, and Edward Heath, the Conservative Leader of the Opposition.

==== "Eleanor Rigby" ====
Womack describes McCartney's "Eleanor Rigby" as a "narrative about the perils of loneliness". The story involves the title character, who is an ageing spinster, and a lonely priest named Father McKenzie who writes "sermon[s] that no one will hear". He presides over Rigby's funeral and acknowledges that despite his efforts, "no one was saved". The first McCartney composition to depart from the themes of a standard love song, its lyrics were the product of a group effort, with Harrison, Starr, Lennon and the latter's friend Pete Shotton all contributing. (Note: Lennon later said he wrote 70 per cent of the lyrics, which McCartney refuted, saying that Lennon contributed "about half a line".) While Lennon and Harrison supplied harmonies beside McCartney's lead vocal, no Beatle played on the recording; instead, Martin arranged the track for a string octet, drawing inspiration from Bernard Herrmann's 1960 film score for Alfred Hitchcock's Psycho. In Riley's opinion, "the corruption of 'Taxman' and the utter finality of Eleanor's fate makes the world of Revolver more ominous than any other pair of opening songs could."

==== "I'm Only Sleeping" ====
The backwards guitar solo from "I'm Only Sleeping"
"I'm Only Sleeping" features a backwards, Indian-style guitar solo that Harrison played in reverse order during the recording. Martin then reversed the tape and dubbed it into the track, achieving what MacDonald describes as "smeared crescendi" and "womblike sucking noises".

Peter Doggett describes "I'm Only Sleeping" as "Half acid dream, half latent Lennon laziness personified." As with "Rain", the basic track was recorded at a faster tempo before being subjected to varispeeding. The latter treatment, along with ADT, was also applied to Lennon's vocal as he sought to replicate, in MacDonald's description, a "papery old man's voice". For the guitar solo, Harrison recorded two separate lines: the first with a clean sound, while on the second, he played his Gibson SG through a fuzzbox. Beatles biographer Jonathan Gould views the solo as appearing to "suspend the laws of time and motion to simulate the half-coherence of the state between wakefulness and sleep". Musicologist Walter Everett likens the song to a "particularly expressive text painting".

==== "Love You To" ====
"Love You To" marked Harrison's first foray into Hindustani classical music as a composer, following his introduction of the sitar on "Norwegian Wood" in 1965. He recorded the track with only minimal contributions from Starr and McCartney, and no input from Lennon; Indian musicians from the Asian Music Circle provided instrumentation such as tabla, tambura and sitar. Peter Lavezzoli recognises the song as "the first conscious attempt in pop to emulate a non-Western form of music in structure and instrumentation". Aside from playing sitar on the track, Harrison's contributions included fuzztone-effected electric guitar. Everett identifies the song's change of metre as unprecedented in the Beatles' work and a characteristic that would go on to feature prominently on Sgt. Pepper. Partly influenced by Harrison's use of LSD, the lyrics address the singer's desire for "immediate sexual gratification", according to Womack, and serve as a "rallying call to accept our inner hedonism and release our worldly inhibitions".

==== "Here, There and Everywhere" ====
"Here, There and Everywhere" is a ballad that McCartney wrote towards the end of the Revolver sessions. His inspiration for the song was the Beach Boys' Pet Sounds track "God Only Knows", which, in turn, Brian Wilson had been inspired to write after repeatedly listening to Rubber Soul. McCartney's double-tracked vocal was treated with varispeeding, resulting in a higher pitch at playback. The song's opening lines are sung in free time before its 4/4 time signature is established; according to Everett, "nowhere else does a Beatles introduction so well prepare a listener for the most striking and expressive tonal events that lie ahead." Womack characterises the song as a romantic ballad "about living in the here and now" and "fully experiencing the conscious moment". He notes that, with the preceding track, "Love You To", the album expresses "corresponding examinations of the human experience of physical and romantic love". (Note: In Riley's opinion, the track "domesticates" the "eroticisms" of "Love You To", drawing comparison with the concise writing of Rodgers and Hart.)

==== "Yellow Submarine" ====
The songs got more interesting, so with that the effects got more interesting. I think the drugs were kicking in a little more heavily on this album ... [Al]though we did take certain substances, we never did it to a great extent at the session. We were really hard workers.

— Ringo Starr, 2000

McCartney and Lennon wrote "Yellow Submarine" as a children's song and for Starr's vocal spot on the album. The lyrics were written with assistance from Scottish singer Donovan and tell of life on a sea voyage accompanied by friends. Gould considers the song's childlike qualities to be "deceptive" and that, once in the studio, it became "a sophisticated sonic pastiche".

On 1 June, the Beatles and some of their friends enhanced the festive nautical atmosphere by adding sounds such as chains, bells, whistles, tubs of water and clinking glasses, all sourced from Studio 2's trap room. (Note: Aside from the band, and Martin and Emerick, the participants included Brian Jones of the Rolling Stones, Pattie Boyd (Harrison's wife), Marianne Faithfull and Beatles aides Mal Evans and Neil Aspinall.) To fill the portion after the lyrics refer to a brass band playing, Martin and Emerick used a recording from EMI's library, splicing up the taped copy and rearranging the melody. Lennon shouted part of the mid-song ship's orders in an echo chamber. In the final verse, he repeats Starr's vocal lines in a manner that Gould likens to "an old vaudevillian with the crowd in the palm of his hand". Riley recognises the song as mixing the comedy of The Goon Show with the satire of Spike Jones. Donovan later said that "Yellow Submarine" represented the Beatles' predicament as prisoners of their international fame, to which they reacted by singing an uplifting, communal song.

==== "She Said She Said" ====
The light atmosphere of "Yellow Submarine" is broken by what Riley terms "the outwardly harnessed, but inwardly raging guitar" that introduces Lennon's "She Said She Said". The song marks the second time that a Beatles arrangement used a shifting metre, after "Love You To", as the foundation of 4/4 briefly switches to 3/4. Harrison recalled that he helped Lennon finish the composition, which involved joining three separate fragments of song. Having walked out of the session, McCartney may or may not have contributed bass guitar to the recording. In addition to lead guitar and harmony vocals, Harrison possibly performed the bass guitar part. (Note: Like Rodriguez, music journalist Mikal Gilmore contends that the argument that preceded McCartney's exit from the studio was LSD-related, since his lack of experience with the drug led Lennon to dismiss his suggestions for the song's arrangement.) The lyric was inspired in part by a conversation that Lennon and Harrison had with actor Peter Fonda in Los Angeles in August 1965, while all three, along with Starr and members of the Byrds, were under the influence of LSD. During the conversation, Fonda commented, "I know what it's like to be dead", because as a child he had technically died during an operation.

=== Side two ===
==== "Good Day Sunshine" ====
"Good Day Sunshine" was written by McCartney, whose piano playing dominates the recording. The track was one of several contemporary songs that evoked the unusually hot and sunny English summer of 1966. Music critic Richie Unterberger describes it as a song that conveys "one of the first fine days of spring, just after you've fallen in love or started a vacation". The verses reflect aspects of vaudeville, while McCartney also acknowledged the influence of the Lovin' Spoonful on the composition. Overdubbed by Martin, the piano solo on the track recalls the ragtime style of Scott Joplin. The song ends with group harmonies repeating the title phrase, creating an effect that Riley likens to a "cascade" of voices "enter[ing] from different directions, like sun peeping through the trees".

==== "And Your Bird Can Sing" ====
"And Your Bird Can Sing" was written primarily by Lennon, with McCartney saying he helped on the lyric and estimating the song as "80–20" to Lennon. Harrison and McCartney played dual lead-guitar parts on the recording, including an ascending riff that Riley terms "magnetic ... everything sticks to it". (Note: As heard on Anthology 2, the Beatles first recorded the song in the style of the Byrds, with prominent harmony vocals and Harrison playing his Rickenbacker twelve-string guitar.) Riley describes the composition as a "shaded putdown" in the style of Dylan's "Positively 4th Street", whereby Lennon sings to someone who has seen "seven wonders" yet is unable to empathise with him and his feelings of isolation. According to Gould, the song was directed at Frank Sinatra after Lennon had read a hagiographic article on the singer, in Esquire magazine, in which Sinatra was lauded as "the fully emancipated male ... the man who can have anything he wants".

==== "For No One" ====
"For No One" was inspired by McCartney's relationship with English actress Jane Asher. Along with "Good Day Sunshine", which similarly dispensed with guitar parts for Harrison and Lennon, Rodriguez cites the track as an example of McCartney eschewing the group dynamic when recording his songs, a trend that would prove unpopular with his bandmates in later years. The recording features McCartney playing piano, bass and clavichord, accompanied by Starr on drums and percussion. The French horn solo was added by Alan Civil, the principal horn player for the Philharmonia Orchestra, who recalled having to "busk" his part, with little guidance from McCartney or Martin at the overdubbing session. While recognising McCartney's "customary logic" in the song's musical structure, MacDonald comments on the sense of detachment conveyed in the lyrics to this "curiously phlegmatic account of the end of an affair". MacDonald suggests that McCartney was attempting to employ the same "dry cinematic eye" that director John Schlesinger had adopted in his 1965 film Darling.

==== "Doctor Robert" ====
"Doctor Robert" was written by Lennon, although McCartney has since stated he co-authored it. A guitar-based rock song in the style of "And Your Bird Can Sing", its lyrics celebrate a New York physician known for dispensing amphetamine injections to his patients. (Note: Although once thought to be Dr Charles Roberts, whose celebrity clients included Edie Sedgwick, the eponymous doctor was Robert Freymann, who was struck off the New York Medical Society's register in 1975.) On the recording, the hard-driving performance is interrupted by two bridge sections where, over harmonium and chiming guitar chords, the group vocals suggest a choir praising the doctor for his services.

==== "I Want to Tell You" ====
Harrison said he wrote "I Want to Tell You" about "the avalanche of thoughts" that he found hard to express in words. Supporting the lyrics, his stammering guitar riff, combined with the dissonance employed in the song's melody, conveys the difficulties of achieving meaningful communication. The prominent backing vocals from Lennon and McCartney include Indian-style gamak ornamentation in McCartney's high harmony, similar to the melisma effect used in "Love You To". Reising and LeBlanc cite the song as an early example of how from 1966 onwards the Beatles' lyrics "adopted an urgent tone, intent on channeling some essential knowledge, the psychological and/or philosophical epiphanies of LSD experience" to their increasingly aware audience. According to academic Nick Bromell, "I Want to Tell You" and the next two tracks on Revolver are the first examples of pop music "giving voice to the complexities of the breakthrough experience" afforded by LSD and other psychedelic drugs. (Note: Bromell qualifies the statement by saying, "If we don't count the Holy Modal Rounders' 1964 cover of Leadbelly's 'Hesitation Blues'", which included a newly written verse referring to "the psychedelic blues".)

==== "Got to Get You into My Life" ====
Described by Riley as the album's "most derivative cut", "Got to Get You into My Life" was influenced by the Motown Sound and written by McCartney after he had seen Stevie Wonder perform at the Scotch of St James nightclub in February. The horn players on the track included members of Georgie Fame's group, the Blue Flames. To capture the desired sound, microphones were placed in the bells of the brass instruments, and the signals were heavily limited. A month later, a tape copy of these horn parts was superimposed with a slight delay, thereby doubling the presence of the brass contributions. Rodriguez terms the completed track "an R&B-styled shouter". Although cast in the form of a love song, McCartney described the lyric as "an ode to pot, like someone else might write an ode to chocolate or a good claret". The initial version of the song, as issued on Anthology 2, featured acoustic backing and organ, and a harmonised refrain of "I need your love", which was replaced by Harrison's guitar break on the more uptempo remake.

==== "Tomorrow Never Knows" ====
This is easily the most amazing new thing we've ever come up with. Some people might say it sounds like a terrible mess of a sound ... But the song ought to be looked on as interesting – if people listen to it with open ears. It's like the Indian stuff. You mustn't listen to Eastern music with a Western ear.

— George Harrison, October 1966

Rodriguez describes Lennon's "Tomorrow Never Knows" as "the greatest leap into the future" of the Beatles' recording career up to this point. The recording includes reverse guitar, processed vocals, and looped tape effects, accompanying a strongly syncopated, repetitive drum-beat. Lennon adapted the lyrics from Timothy Leary's book The Psychedelic Experience: A Manual Based on The Tibetan Book of the Dead, which equates the realisations brought about through LSD with the spiritually enlightened state achieved through meditation. Originally known as "Mark I", and then briefly "The Void", the eventual title came via one of Starr's malapropisms. (Note: Lennon later said "The Void" would have been a more suitable title, but he was concerned about its obvious drug connotations.)

Sample from "Tomorrow Never Knows"
According to Colin Larkin, Lennon's drug-inspired song "has been described as the most effective evocation of a LSD experience ever recorded".

Lennon intended the track as an evocation of a Tibetan Buddhist ceremony. The song's harmonic structure is derived from Indian music and is based on a high-volume C drone played by Harrison on a tambura. Over the foundation of tambura, bass and drums, the five tape loops comprise various manipulated sounds: two separate sitar passages, played backwards and sped up; an orchestra sounding a B♭ chord; McCartney's laughter, sped up to resemble a seagull's cry; and a Mellotron played on either its flute, string or brass setting. (Note: According to Rodriguez, this list seems the most likely combination of sounds fed into the track, although commentators have long disagreed on the precise content of the five loops. In place of the Mellotron sample, Ryan and Kehew list a mandolin or acoustic guitar, treated with tape echo.) The Leslie speaker treatment applied to Lennon's vocal originated from his request that Martin make him sound like he was the Dalai Lama singing from the top of a high mountain. Reising describes "Tomorrow Never Knows" as the inspiration for an album that "illuminates a path dedicated to personal freedom and mind expansion". He views the song's message as a precursor to the more explicitly political statements the Beatles would make over the next two years, in "All You Need Is Love" and "Revolution".

=== North American format ===
Capitol's version of Revolver omitted "I'm Only Sleeping", "And Your Bird Can Sing" and "Doctor Robert". In the case of "I'm Only Sleeping", the version issued on Yesterday and Today was a different mix from that included on EMI's Revolver. Due to the exclusion of the three Lennon tracks, there were only two songs on the Capitol release for which he was the principal writer, compared with three by Harrison and six by McCartney. In Riley's opinion, aside from underplaying Lennon's contribution, his voice is thereby confined to a "sudden swing to the surreal" at the end of each LP side, which distorts the intended mood across the album.

The eleven-song North American LP was the band's tenth album on Capitol Records and twelfth US album in total. The release of Revolver marked the last time that Capitol issued an altered UK Beatles album for the North American market. When the Beatles re-signed with EMI in January 1967, their contract stipulated that Capitol could no longer alter the track listings of their albums.

== Packaging ==
=== Artwork ===
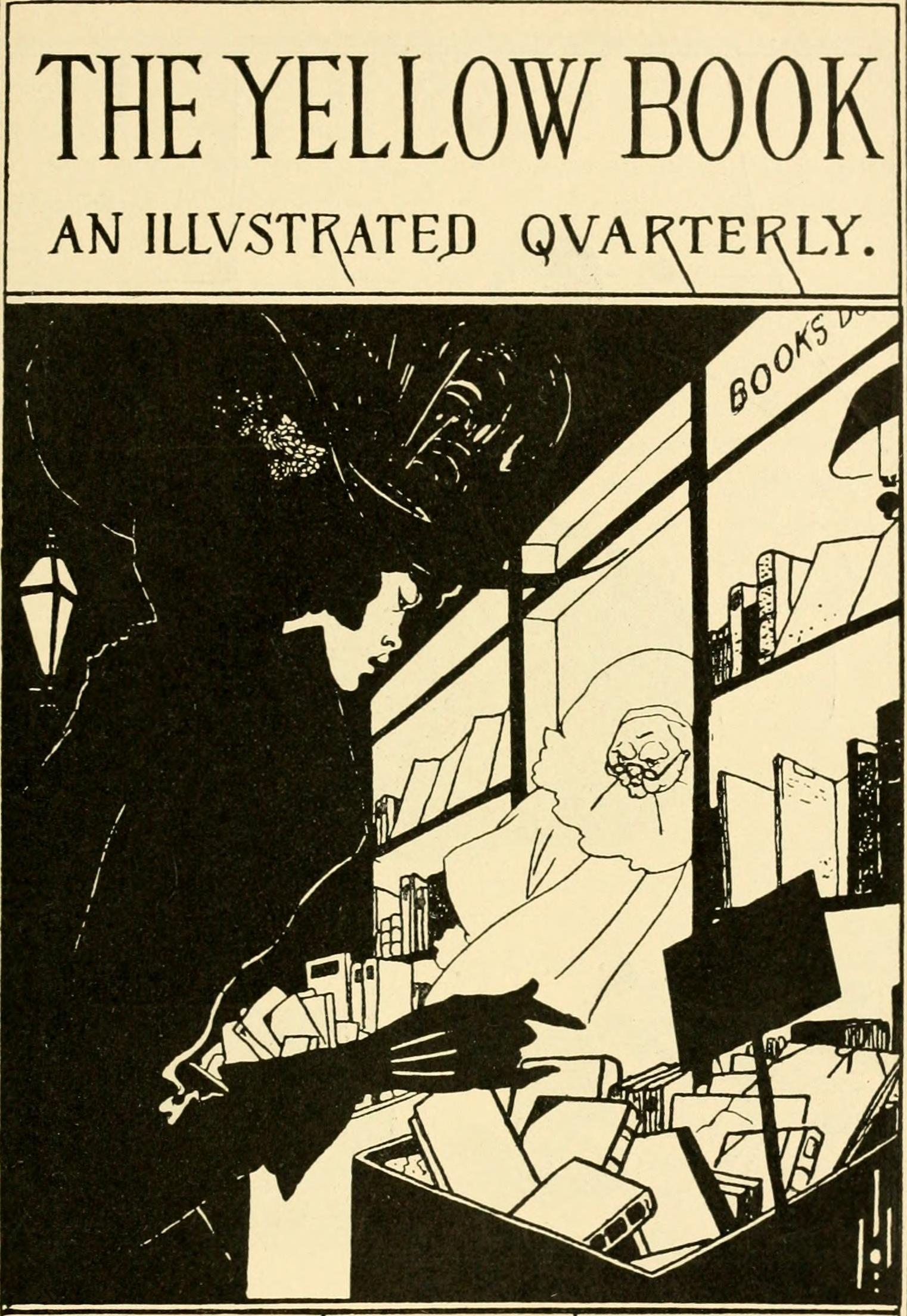
For the cover of Revolver, Klaus Voormann drew inspiration from The Yellow Book illustrator Aubrey Beardsley.

The cover for Revolver was created by German-born bassist and artist Klaus Voormann, one of the Beatles' oldest friends from their time in Hamburg during the early 1960s. Voormann's artwork was part line drawing and part collage, using photographs mostly taken over 1964–65 by Robert Freeman. (Note: Originally, the cover art for the album was going to be an image created by Freeman that included photos of each of the Beatles' faces revolving in circles repeatedly in layers. The band ultimately rejected the idea.) In his line drawings of the four Beatles (McCartney, Lennon, Harrison and Starr, clockwise from top-left), Voormann drew inspiration from the work of the nineteenth-century illustrator Aubrey Beardsley, who was the subject of a long-running exhibition at London's Victoria and Albert Museum in 1966 and highly influential on fashion and design themes of the time. Voormann placed the various photos within the tangle of hair that connects the four faces. Turner writes that the drawings show each Beatle "in another state of consciousness", such that the older images appear to be tumbling out from them.

Voormann's aim was to reflect the radical departure in sound represented, particularly by "Tomorrow Never Knows", and his choice of a black-and-white cover was in deliberate defiance of the preference for vivid colour. When he submitted his work to the Beatles, Epstein wept, overjoyed that Voormann had managed to capture the experimental tone of the Beatles' new music. Voormann also designed a series of four images, titled "Wood Face", "Wool Face", "Triangle Face" and "Sun Face", which appeared on the front of the Northern Songs sheet music for each of the album's songs.

Colour outtake from Robert Whitaker's photo session that produced the back-cover image used on the LP.

The LP's back cover included a photograph of the Beatles, in Riley's description, "shaded by the hip modesty of sunglasses and cigarette smoke". The photo was part of a series taken by Robert Whitaker during the filming at Abbey Road on 19 May and demonstrated the Beatles' adoption of fashions from boutiques that had recently opened in Chelsea, rather than the Carnaby Street designers they had favoured previously. From these Chelsea boutiques, Lennon wore a long-collared paisley shirt from Granny Takes a Trip, while Harrison was dressed in a wide-lapelled velvet jacket designed by Hung on You. Turner views the selection of attire as reflective of the Beatles "still dressing similarly yet with an individual stamp"; he identifies the choice of sunglasses as another example of a unified yet personalised look, whereby the styles ranged from oblong-shaped lenses, for Lennon, to an oval-shaped pair worn by Starr. Gould, who describes Starr's glasses as "ludicrously bug-eyed", considers the cover design to be consistent with the "break with the past" ethos that had guided the album's creation.

During the same photo shoot, Whitaker took pictures of the Beatles examining transparencies of his "butcher cover" design for Yesterday and Today. The latter image proved instantly controversial in America due to its depiction of dismembered baby dolls and raw meat.

=== Title ===
The album's title, like that of Rubber Soul, is a pun, referring to both a kind of handgun and the "revolving" motion of a record as it plays on a turntable. Gould views the title as a "McLuhanesque pun", since, more so than on their previous albums, the focus of Revolver appears to rotate from one Beatle to another with each song. (Note: Gould finds this characteristic emphasised in the "Lead Singer" credits on both the cover and the record's face labels, which list an individual vocalist for each track, with none of the shared lead vocals that had been a feature of Rubber Soul.)

The group had originally wanted to call the album Abracadabra, until they discovered that another band had already used it. When discussing possible alternatives, during their German tour, Lennon opted for Four Sides to the Circle in response to McCartney's Magic Circle, and Starr jokingly suggested After Geography, a play on the title of the Rolling Stones' recently released Aftermath LP. Other suggestions included Bubble and Squeak, Beatles on Safari, Freewheelin' Beatles and Pendulum before the band settled on Revolver. They confirmed their choice in a telegram to EMI, sent from the Tokyo Hilton on 2 July.

== Release ==
We'll lose some fans with [the new album], but we'll also gain some. The fans we'll probably lose will be the ones who like the things about us that we never liked anyway ...

— Paul McCartney, June 1966

In mid-May 1966, Tony Hall of Record Mirror wrote a preview of the Beatles' new recordings in which he opined that some of them were "the most revolutionary ever made by a pop group". While avoiding mention of the official song titles, he highlighted Lennon's "The Void" for its electronic effects, along with a "McCartney song about lonely people" set to string orchestration, and a "Harrison number on which he plays a long exotic solo on sitar". In Britain, EMI gradually distributed the album's songs to radio stations throughout July – a strategy that MacDonald describes as "building anticipation for what would clearly be a radical new phase in the group's recording career". Revolver was released there on 5 August and on 8 August in the United States. "Eleanor Rigby" was issued as a double A-side single with "Yellow Submarine". The pairing of a ballad devoid of any instrumentation played by a Beatle and a novelty song marked a significant departure from the usual content of the band's singles.

Schaffner likens the Beatles' 1966 recordings to the moment of transformation in the film The Wizard of Oz, "where, when Dorothy discovers herself transported from Kansas to Oz, the film dramatically changes from black-and-white to glorious technicolor". The album appeared a year before psychedelic drugs became a phenomenon in youth culture, and it was the source of confusion for the group's more conservative fans. A female writer later complained in Beatles Monthly that 1966 represented the end of "The Beatles we used to know before they went stark, raving mad." In this way, Revolver marked the start of a change in the Beatles' core audience, as their young, female-dominated fanbase gave way to a following that increasingly comprised more serious-minded, male listeners. (Note: Despite its origins as an innocent children's song, "Yellow Submarine" was adopted by the counterculture as a song promoting drugs, namely the barbiturate Nembutal.)

The release coincided with a period of public relations challenges for the band, the combination of which led to their decision to retire from touring following the end of their North American tour, on 29 August. (Note: The Beatles received death threats from Japanese ultra-nationalists and were confined in their hotel suite under heavy security during their time in Tokyo. The group then inadvertently snubbed the Marcos regime in the Philippines by failing to attend a function in their honour, triggering a campaign of vilification in the national press and mob violence as the tour party attempted to leave Manila.) In the US, the album's release was a secondary event to the controversy surrounding the recent publication there of Cleave's interview with Lennon, in which he remarked that the Beatles had become "more popular than Jesus". This episode followed the unfavourable reaction to the Yesterday and Today butcher sleeve, from the press, radio stations and retail outlets. (Note: Soon withdrawn by Capitol, the butcher cover had provoked interpretation as a comment by the Beatles on the US record-company policy of "mutilating the product", according to Everett. Epstein's attempts to quell any ill feeling towards the Beatles, in advance of the North American tour, were further frustrated by the publication of derogatory remarks about America from McCartney and Harrison.) As a result, at press conferences during the tour, questions were typically focused on religious matters rather than the band's new music. In addition, the group were vocal in their opposition to the Vietnam War, a stand that further redefined their public image in the US. The Beatles did not attempt to perform any of the songs from Revolver during the tour.

Reporting on "Swinging London" for The Village Voice, Richard Goldstein said that, as if in response to the antagonism being shown towards the band in the US, "British youth has flipped completely over the new Beatle album, Revolver." Howard Sounes writes that, amid the fine weather of the 1966 summer and England's recent win in the World Cup, Revolver was the nation's "soundtrack album of the season". (Note: In Goldstein's description of London: "The sound of Revolver blares from window after window. John harmonizes with Paul in greengrocers and boutiques. George plays his sitar from cars stalled in traffic. Ringo ricochets from the dome of Saint Paul's. The Beatles are harder to avoid than even the American [tourist].")

== Commercial performance ==
In the UK, where "Eleanor Rigby" was the favoured side, the single became the best-selling song of 1966, after topping the national chart for four weeks during August and September. On Record Retailer's LPs chart (later the UK Albums Chart), Revolver entered at number 1 and stayed there for seven weeks during its 34-week run in the top 40. On the national chart compiled by Melody Maker, the album was number 1 for nine weeks. By October, at least ten of the LP's songs had been covered by other artists and reviewed by Melody Maker. Among these, Cliff Bennett and the Rebel Rousers' version of "Got to Get You into My Life", which McCartney co-produced, was a top ten hit. McCartney's ballads "Here, There and Everywhere" and "For No One" became highly popular among mainstream recording artists. In the UK, Revolver was the second–highest-selling album of 1966, behind The Sound of Music. In the NME readers' poll for 1966, Revolver and Pet Sounds were jointly recognised as the magazine's "Album of the Year".

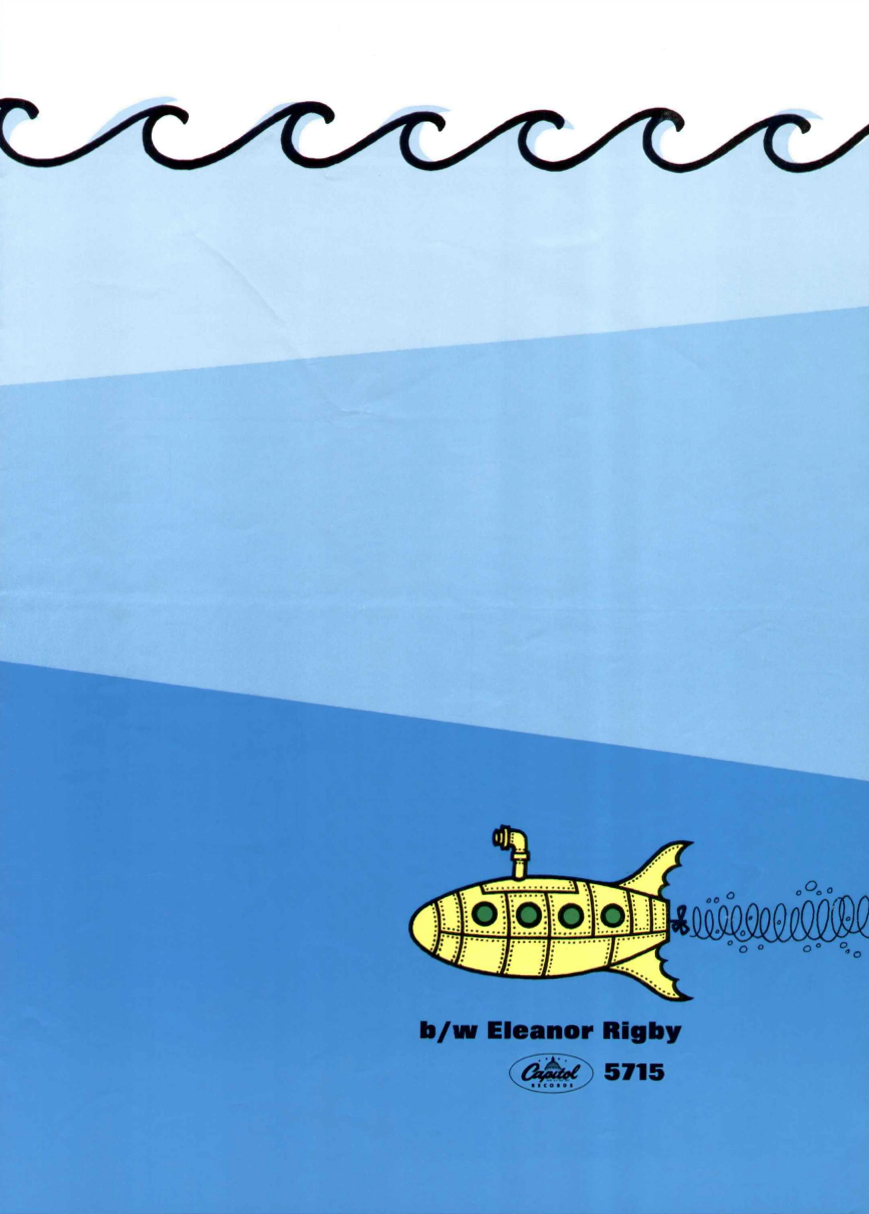
Capitol's trade ad for the album's double A-side single, favouring "Yellow Submarine" over "Eleanor Rigby"

In America, Capitol were wary of the religious references in "Eleanor Rigby", given the ongoing controversy, and instead pushed "Yellow Submarine". The latter peaked at number 2 on the Billboard Hot 100, making it, in Gould's description, "the first 'designated' Beatles single since 1963" not to top that chart. On the Billboard Top LPs chart, Revolver hit number 1 on 10 September, a week after the end of Yesterday and Today's five-week run at the top. The Beatles were presented with gold discs from the Recording Industry Association of America (RIAA), recognising the album as a "million seller", during their 24 August press conference at the Capitol Tower in Hollywood. Revolver was number 1 there for six weeks and remained on the chart until mid-February 1968. In March 1967, Revolver was nominated for the Grammy Award for Album of the Year. Voormann's cover design won the Grammy for Best Album Cover, Graphic Arts. (Note: "Eleanor Rigby" was also recognised at the 1967 Grammys, where McCartney won in the Best Contemporary/R&R Solo Vocal Performance category.)

Based on retail sales up to early October 1966, Revolver was the eighth–highest-selling album of the year in the US. Although commercially successful, it ranked only equal tenth (with Help!) on the list of the Beatles' biggest-selling albums in the US, as supplied by Allen Klein in 1970. According to figures published in 2009 by former Capitol executive David Kronemyer, further to estimates he gave in MuseWire magazine, the album had sold 1,187,869 copies in the US by 31 December 1966 and 1,725,276 copies by the end of the decade.

The April 1987 CD release of Revolver standardised the track listing to the original UK version. Revolver returned to the UK Albums Chart the following month, peaking at number 55, while the 2009 remastered album reached number 9. In 2013, after the British Phonographic Industry altered its sales award protocol, the album was certified Platinum based on UK sales since 1994. In January 2014, the Capitol version of Revolver was issued on CD for the first time, both as part of the Beatles' U.S. Albums box set and as an individual release. As of that year, Revolver had been certified 5× Platinum by the RIAA.

== Critical reception ==
=== Contemporary reviews ===
In Britain, the reception to Revolver was highly favourable. Having found Rubber Soul "almost monotonous" at times, Melody Maker lauded the new release, saying it was a work that would "change the direction of pop music". The reviewer highlighted its "electronic effects", McCartney's "penchant for the classics" and Harrison's "stunning use of the sitar" as diverse elements that distinguished the LP as a group effort, such that the four band members' "individual personalities are now showing through loud and clear". The writer concluded: "this is a brilliant album which underlines once and for all that the Beatles have definitely broken the bounds of what we used to call pop." Peter Clayton, a jazz critic for Gramophone magazine, described it as "an astonishing collection" that defied easy categorisation since much of the LP had no precedent in the context of pop music. Clayton concluded: "if there's anything wrong with the record at all it is that such a diet of newness might give the ordinary pop-picker indigestion."

Edward Greenfield of The Guardian titled his review "Thinking Pop" and wrote that the three Beatles songwriters "habitually go outside the realm of sloppy love-theme, and find inspiration instead (as serious artists always must) in specific feelings and specific experiences". Highlighting the importance of McCartney's classical aesthetic, he recognised the band's ongoing success as "fair vindication" for popular taste in terms of its alignment with artistic merit. In their joint review for Record Mirror, Richard Green and Peter Jones found the album "full of musical ingenuity" yet "controversial", and added: "There are parts that will split the pop fraternity neatly down the middle." (Note: According to Schaffner, one of the album's few detractors was Jonathan King, an English "pop-star-turned-pundit" who dismissed it as "pseudo-intellectual rubbish". Ray Davies of the Kinks, who held a grudge against the Beatles from 1964, also disparaged the album when invited to give a rundown of the songs in Disc and Music Echo. Davies said Revolver was inferior to Rubber Soul.) In her round-up of 1966 for the Evening Standard, Maureen Cleave named Revolver and the single as the year's best records, although she rued that, together with Mick Jagger, the Beatles had become aloof in that, "Unlike anybody else, they seemed to know what they wanted." (Note: Reviewing the album in late July, Cleave wrote, "I am tired of wondering how the Beatles keep it up, but how do they keep it up?" and she concluded, "Never have I been able to recommend an LP with more conviction.")

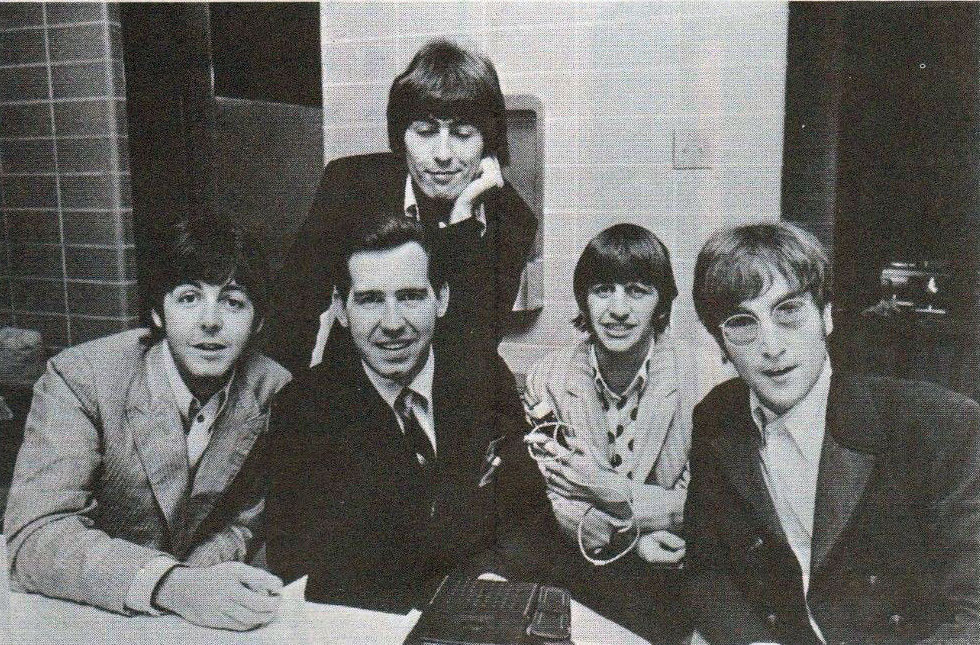
The group (with disc jockey Jim Stagg) during their final tour, in August 1966

Due to the controversies surrounding the Beatles during their tour, critical reaction in the US was muted relative to the band's previous releases. According to Rodriguez, in redefining the limits of pop music, Revolver emphasised the need for genuine rock criticism, a form of journalism that only became commonplace from 1967. KRLA Beat's reviewer described Revolver as "a musical creation of exceptional excellence" but lamented that, amid the continued acclaim for Rubber Soul, "it is receiving only a fraction of the attention and respect due", and some Americans were overly focusing on the band's "political views". Writing in the recently launched Crawdaddy!, Paul Williams gave the US LP a mixed review, in which he admired "Love You To" and "Eleanor Rigby" but derided "Tomorrow Never Knows" and "Yellow Submarine". Williams lauded the album's musical range but found it lacked an integral quality, which he acknowledged was outside the group's control.

According to Turner, the album's combination of novel sounds and unusual subject matter "challenged all the conventions of pop" and it was the upcoming generation of writers who "got it immediately". Ralph J. Gleason, then the jazz critic for the San Francisco Chronicle, wrote it was "the most outstanding pop album in years, possibly the best of all time", with "[n]ot a single disappointing track". In his article for The Village Voice, Richard Goldstein described Revolver as "a revolutionary record" that was "as important to the expansion of pop as was Rubber Soul", and one that demanded that the genre's "boundaries ... be re-negotiated". He added: "it seems now that we will view this album in retrospect as a key work in the development of rock and roll into an artistic pursuit ..." (Note: A recent New Journalism graduate, Goldstein was the first dedicated rock critic to be appointed at an established American publication. His appraisal of Revolver was, in Bernard Gendron's description, "the first substantial rock review devoted to one album to appear in any nonrock magazine with accreditory power".) Another writer identified by Turner, Jules Siegel, likened Revolver to works by John Donne, John Milton and William Shakespeare, saying that the band's lyrics would provide the basis for scholarly analysis well into the future.

Recalling Revolver's release in his book Revolution in the Head, Ian MacDonald says that the Beatles "initiated a second pop revolution – one which while galvanising their existing rivals and inspiring many new ones, left all of them far behind". In a February 1967 review, Hit Parader declared: "Revolver represents the pinnacle of pop music. No group has been as consistently creative as the Beatles, though the [Lovin'] Spoonful and Beach Boys are coming closer all the time ... Rather than analyze the music we just suggest that you listen to Revolver three or four times a day and marvel ..." Later that year, in Esquire, Robert Christgau said the album was "twice as good and four times as startling as Rubber Soul, with sound effects, Oriental drones, jazz bands, transcendentalist lyrics, all kinds of rhythmic and harmonic surprises, and a filter that made John Lennon sound like God singing through a foghorn".

=== Retrospective assessments ===
Professional ratings
Review scores
Source	Rating
AllMusic	5/5 stars
The A.V. Club	A+
Blender	5/5 stars
The Daily Telegraph	5/5 stars
Encyclopedia of Popular Music	5/5 stars
MusicHound Rock	4.5/5
Paste	100/100
Pitchfork	10/10
The Rolling Stone Album Guide	5/5 stars
Sputnikmusic	5/5

In the 2004 edition of The Rolling Stone Album Guide, Rob Sheffield wrote that Revolver found the Beatles "at the peak of their powers, competing with one another because nobody else could touch them"; he described it as "the best album the Beatles ever made, which means the best album by anybody". Writing for PopMatters that year, David Medsker said that Revolver showed the four band members "peaking at the exact same time", and he deemed it to be "the best of the bunch, the letter that went unanswered" among a series of reciprocally influential musical statements exchanged between the Beatles and the Beach Boys over 1965–67. In a 2007 appraisal of the band's albums, Henry Yates of Classic Rock magazine paired it with Sgt. Pepper's as the two "essential classics" in the Beatles' canon and described it as "Always the rock fraternity's favourite (and the blueprint for Noel Gallagher's career)". Writing in Paste, Mark Kemp says that the album "completed [the Beatles'] transformation from the mop tops of three years earlier into bold, groundbreaking experimental rockers", while Paul Du Noyer, in a review for Blender, said that it marked the group's arrival as "psychedelic gurus" and was a work in which the Beatles "revolutionized their own style and rock music itself ... with the boldest innovations of the band's career".

Stephen Thomas Erlewine of AllMusic describes Revolver as "the ultimate modern pop album". While noting the diverse musical directions adopted by Lennon, McCartney and Harrison in their respective contributions, he states: "The biggest miracle of Revolver may be that the Beatles covered so much new stylistic ground and executed it perfectly on one record, or it may be that all of it holds together perfectly." In his review for The Daily Telegraph, Neil McCormick says that the album shows the band at their most unified and is a work in which "they introduce whole new vistas of sound yet still contain them within tightly structured and performed songs." He also attributes an acerbic quality to the album that psychedelia lacked once the genre succumbed to "the woolly politics of flower power". Scott Plagenhoef of Pitchfork views Revolver as a "sonic landmark" that, in its lyrics, "matur[ed] pop from the stuff of teen dreams to a more serious pursuit that actively reflected and shaped the times in which its creators lived". He considers it to be McCartney's "maturation record" as a songwriter in the same way that Rubber Soul had been for Lennon.

Chris Coplan of Consequence of Sound is less impressed with the album, rating it a "B" and "the black sheep of the Beatles' catalog". Although he admires the psychedelic tone, he considers that this experimentalism renders the more standard pop songs, such as "Got to Get You into My Life" and "Here, There and Everywhere", "seemingly out of place" within the collection. Writing for Rough Guides, Chris Ingham describes it as "clearly brilliant" but adds: "There's an edge to the sound and a danger in the air ... that makes listening to it an uncomfortable trip. It's easy to admire, even to be awed by, but some listeners find Revolver a little harder to love." In retrospect, Christgau says he prefers Sgt. Pepper, Rubber Soul and Abbey Road to Revolver, finding the latter "somewhat cluttered" but nevertheless worthy of a "high A minus".

== Influence and legacy ==
=== Development of popular music and 1960s counterculture ===
The unearthly sounds that Revolver released into the world were at once the antithesis of the human and a provocative indication of the mysterium tremendum ... As they took their audience through a radically defamiliarized acoustic universe, these sounds were essentially questioning sounds. They kept forcing their audience to ask: what is this I'm listening to?

— Academic Nick Bromell, 2000

MacDonald deems Lennon's remark about the Beatles' "god-like status" in March 1966 to have been "fairly realistic", given the reaction to Revolver. He adds: "The album's aural invention was so masterful that it seemed to Western youth that The Beatles knew – that they had the key to current events and were somehow orchestrating them through their records." MacDonald highlights "the radically subversive" message of "Tomorrow Never Knows" – exhorting listeners to empty their minds of all ego- and material-related thought – as the inauguration of a "till-then élite-preserved concept of mind-expansion into pop, simultaneously drawing attention to consciousness-enhancing drugs and the ancient religious philosophies of the Orient". Shawn Levy writes that the album presented an alternative reality that contemporary listeners felt compelled to explore further; he describes it as "the first true drug album, not a pop record with some druggy insinuations, but an honest-to-heaven, steeped-in-the-out-there trip from the here and now into who knew where". (Note: In Nick Bromell's recollection, many teenagers would soon experiment with psychedelic drugs, but through the existential questions raised by Revolver, the Beatles "made being feel right even for their fans who never experimented with psychedelics". He comments that the album demanded that fans "learn a new way of listening, develop a new kind of taste", and their loyalty in doing so was apposite to the norm that pop culture should adhere to "a familiar, frictionless world".)

According to Simon Philo, Revolver announced the arrival of the "underground London" sound, supplanting that of Swinging London. Barry Miles describes the album as an "advertisement for the underground", and recalls that it resounded on the level of experimental jazz among members of the movement, including those who soon founded the UFO Club. He says it established rock 'n' roll as an art form and identifies its "trailblazing" quality as the impetus for Pink Floyd's The Piper at the Gates of Dawn and for Brian Wilson to complete the Beach Boys' "mini-symphony", "Good Vibrations". Citing composer and producer Virgil Moorefield's book The Producer as Composer, Jay Hodgson highlights Revolver as a "dramatic turning point" in recording history through its dedication to studio exploration over the "performability" of the songs, as this and subsequent Beatles albums reshaped listeners' preconceptions of a pop recording. In his review for Pitchfork, Plagenhoef says that the album not only "redefin[ed] what was expected from popular music", but recast the Beatles as "avatars for a transformative cultural movement". MacDonald cites Revolver as a musical statement that, further to the Rubber Soul track "The Word" and "Rain", helped guide the counterculture towards the 1967 Summer of Love due to the widespread popularity of the Beatles.

Revolver has been recognised as having inspired new subgenres of music, anticipating electronica, punk rock, baroque rock and world music, among other styles. According to Rolling Stone, the album "signaled that in popular music, anything – any theme, any musical idea – could now be realized". Through the Beatles' example, psychedelia moved from its underground roots into the mainstream, thereby originating the longer-lasting psychedelic pop style. Russell Reising and Jim LeBlanc credit the songs on Revolver with "set[ting] the stage for an important subgenre of psychedelic music, that of the messianic pronouncement". As with Rubber Soul, Walter Everett views the album's "experimental timbres, rhythms, tonal structures, and poetic texts" as the inspiration for many of the bands that formed the progressive rock genre in the early 1970s. He also considers Revolver to be "an innovative example of electronic music" as much as it broke new ground in pop by being "fundamentally unlike any rock album that had preceded it". (Note: While recognising it as the inspiration for the Moody Blues' 1968 album In Search of the Lost Chord, Everett says that Revolver's most profound influence on the Beatles' contemporaries was through "its general emancipation from Western pop norms of melody, harmony, instrumentation, formal structure, rhythm, and engineering".) Rolling Stone attributes the development of the Los Angeles and San Francisco music scenes, including subsequent releases by the Beach Boys, Love and the Grateful Dead, to the influence of Revolver, particularly "She Said She Said".

Steve Turner likens the Beatles' creative approach in 1966 to that of modern jazz musicians, and recognises their channelling of Indian and Western classical, Southern soul, and electronic musical styles into their work as unprecedented in popular music. He says that, through the band's efforts to faithfully translate their LSD-inspired vision into music, "Revolver opened the doors to psychedelic rock (or acid rock)", while the primitive means by which it was recorded (on four-track equipment) inspired the work that artists such as Pink Floyd, Genesis, Yes and the Electric Light Orchestra were able to achieve with advances in studio technology. Turner also highlights the pioneering sampling and tape manipulation employed on "Tomorrow Never Knows" as having "a profound effect on everyone from Jimi Hendrix to Jay-Z". (Note: He also recognises Revolver as the forerunner to songs celebrating recreational drugs – whether LSD, amphetamines, heroin, cannabis or ecstasy – by Hendrix, the Small Faces, the Velvet Underground, Primal Scream, Lil Wayne and Jay-Z.)

Rodriguez praises Martin and Emerick's contribution to the album, saying that their talents were as essential to its success as the Beatles'. While also highlighting the importance of the production, David Howard writes that Revolver was a "genre-transforming album", on which Martin and the Beatles had "obliterated recording studio conventions". Combined with the similarly "visionary" work of American producer Phil Spector, Howard continues, through Revolver, the recording studio had become "its own instrument; record production had been elevated into art."

=== Ascendancy over Sgt. Pepper ===
There's a case to be made that the Beatles went on to do Sgt. Pepper's because there was nowhere else to go but too far. With Revolver, they had mapped out the pop universe so perfectly that all they could do next was tear it up and start again.

— David Quantick, writing in Q magazine, 2000

Whereas Sgt. Pepper had long been identified as the Beatles' greatest album, since the 2000s Revolver has often surpassed it in lists of the group's best work. Sheffield cites the album's 1987 CD release, with the full complement of Lennon compositions, as marking the start of a process whereby Revolver "steadily climbed in public estimation" to become recognised as the Beatles' finest work. Everett also attributes the "problem" regarding the album's standing in the US to the "inferior track listing" available to Americans until the CD release. (Note: Riley calls Revolver the Beatles' best album but also, in the edition issued by Capitol, their "most artistically compromised".) In Britain, its supremacy over Sgt. Pepper was one of the cultural revisions established by the Britpop phenomenon in the 1990s. Writing on the BBC's website in August 2016, Greg Kot identified the "More popular than Jesus" controversy and the attention subsequently afforded the release of Sgt. Pepper in 1967 as the two factors that had contributed to Revolver being relatively overlooked. Kot concluded that the ensuing decades had seen this impression reversed, since Revolver "does everything Sgt Pepper did, except it did it first and often better. It just wasn't as well-packaged and marketed." (Note: In his 2004 review for PopMatters, Medsker similarly opined that "It's taken almost 30 years for music historians to put the Beatles work into proper perspective. Sgt. Pepper carried the title of best album of all time for ages ... In the last couple years, however, revisionist history has actually changed things for the better. Revolver is king.")

Rodriguez writes that, whereas most contemporary acts shy away from attempting a concept album in the vein of Sgt. Pepper, the prototype established by Revolver, whereby an album serves as an "eclectic collection of diverse songs", continues to influence modern popular music. He characterises Revolver as "the Beatles' artistic high-water mark" and says that, unlike Sgt. Pepper, it was the product of a collaborative effort, with "the group as a whole being fully vested in creating Beatle music".

=== Appearances on best-album lists and further recognition ===
Revolver has appeared high up in many lists of the best albums ever made, often in the top position. It was voted the third-best album of all time in the 1998 "Music of the Millennium" poll conducted by HMV and Channel 4, and in the following year's expanded survey, which polled 600,000 people across the UK. Also in 1998, it was ranked first in Colin Larkin's All Time Top 1000 Albums, directly ahead of Sgt. Pepper and The Beatles, and it was first again in the 2000 edition of the book. Q placed it at number 1 in its list of the "50 Greatest British Albums Ever" in 2000; four years later, the album topped the same magazine's list "The Music That Changed the World". In 2001, it topped VH1's "100 Greatest Albums", compiled from a poll of more than 500 journalists, music executives and artists. In 2003, Rolling Stone ranked Revolver third on its list of the "500 Greatest Albums of All Time", a position it retained on the magazine's revised list nine years later.

In 2004, Revolver appeared at number 2 in The Observer's list of "The 100 Greatest British Albums", compiled by a panel of 100 contributors. In 2006, it was chosen by Time magazine as one of the 100 best albums and topped a similar list compiled by Hot Press. That same year, Guitar World readers chose it as the tenth best guitar album of all time. In 2010, Revolver was named the best pop album by the official newspaper of the Holy See, L'Osservatore Romano. In 2013, Entertainment Weekly placed the album at number 1 in its "All-Time Greatest" albums. In September 2020, Rolling Stone ranked Revolver at number 11 on its new list of the "500 Greatest Albums of All Time".

In 1999, Revolver was inducted into the Grammy Hall of Fame, an award bestowed by the American Recording Academy "to honor recordings of lasting qualitative or historical significance that are at least 25 years old". According to art and culture journalist Robin Stummer, writing in 2016, Voormann's cover is similarly recognised as "one of the finest pop artworks". The album has been the subject of several tribute albums, such as Revolver Reloaded, a multi-artist CD included with the July 2006 issue of Mojo. Beatles tribute bands have named themselves after Revolver, and Reising lists Revolver Records, the heavy metal magazine Revolver and Revolver Films as other examples that appear to honour the 1966 album. In his view, "Like few other rock and roll recordings, Revolver has assumed the status of cultural icon, approaching in its many avatars, its impact and its endurance the status of some of the definitive works of Anglo–American culture such as Herman Melville's Moby-Dick and James Joyce's Ulysses."

== Reissues ==
The album was first issued on compact disc, world-wide, on 30 April 1987, along with the albums Help and Rubber Soul. This release standardized the album to the stereo format and canonized the 14 tracks that appeared on the British version of the album. In 2009, Apple and EMI released remastered versions of the Beatles albums on CD. Revolver was also included in the box sets released at the time, The Beatles: Stereo Box Set and The Beatles in Mono Box Set.

On 28 October 2022, a remixed and expanded edition of Revolver was released. It includes a new stereo remix of the album by Giles Martin, with the help of de-mixing technology developed by Peter Jackson's WingNut Films, as well as the original mono mix, session recordings, demos and an EP containing new mixes of "Paperback Writer" and "Rain".

== Track listing ==
The following track listing is for the original release in all markets other than North America and was subsequently adopted as the standard version of the album for its international CD release in 1987. The original North American edition used this order except for omitting "I'm Only Sleeping", "And Your Bird Can Sing" and "Doctor Robert". All tracks written by Lennon–McCartney, except where noted. (Note: All lead vocalist credits and track lengths per Harry Castleman and Walter Podrazik.)

Side one
No.	Title	Lead vocals	Length
1.	"Taxman" (George Harrison)	Harrison	2:36
2.	"Eleanor Rigby"	McCartney	2:11
3.	"I'm Only Sleeping"	Lennon	3:02
4.	"Love You To" (Harrison)	Harrison	3:00
5.	"Here, There and Everywhere"	McCartney	2:29
6.	"Yellow Submarine"	Starr	2:40
7.	"She Said She Said"	Lennon	2:39
Total length:			18:33

Side two
No.	Title	Lead vocals	Length
1.	"Good Day Sunshine"	McCartney	2:08
2.	"And Your Bird Can Sing"	Lennon	2:02
3.	"For No One"	McCartney	2:03
4.	"Doctor Robert"	Lennon	2:14
5.	"I Want to Tell You" (Harrison)	Harrison	2:30
6.	"Got to Get You into My Life"	McCartney	2:31
7.	"Tomorrow Never Knows"	Lennon	3:00
Total length:			16:28 35:01

== Personnel ==
According to Mark Lewisohn and Ian MacDonald, except where noted:

The Beatles

- John Lennon – lead, harmony and backing vocals; rhythm and acoustic guitars; Hammond organ, Mellotron, harmonium; tape loops, sound effects; tambourine, handclaps, finger snaps
- Paul McCartney – lead, harmony and backing vocals; bass, rhythm and lead guitars; piano, clavichord; tape loops, sound effects; handclaps, finger snaps
- George Harrison – lead, harmony and backing vocals; lead, acoustic, rhythm and bass guitars; sitar, tambura; tape loops, sound effects; maracas, tambourine, handclaps, finger snaps
- Ringo Starr – drums; tambourine, maracas, cowbell, shaker, handclaps, finger snaps; tape loops; lead and backing vocals on "Yellow Submarine"

Additional musicians and production

- Anil Bhagwat – tabla on "Love You To"
- Alan Civil – French horn on "For No One"
- George Martin – producer; mixing engineer; piano on "Good Day Sunshine" and "Tomorrow Never Knows"; Hammond organ on "Got to Get You into My Life"; tape loop of the marching band on "Yellow Submarine"
- Geoff Emerick – recording and mixing engineer; tape loop of the marching band on "Yellow Submarine"
- Mal Evans – bass drum and background vocals on "Yellow Submarine"
- Neil Aspinall – background vocals on "Yellow Submarine"
- Brian Jones – sound effects, ocarina and background vocals on "Yellow Submarine"
- Pattie Boyd – background vocals on "Yellow Submarine"
- Marianne Faithfull – background vocals on "Yellow Submarine"
- Alf Bicknell – sound effects and background vocals on "Yellow Submarine"
- Tony Gilbert, Sidney Sax, John Sharpe, Jurgen Hess – violins; Stephen Shingles, John Underwood – violas; Derek Simpson, Norman Jones – cellos: string octet on "Eleanor Rigby", orchestrated and conducted by George Martin (with Paul McCartney)
- Eddie Thornton, Ian Hamer, Les Condon – trumpet; Peter Coe, Alan Branscombe – tenor saxophone: horn section on "Got to Get You into My Life" arranged and conducted by George Martin (with Paul McCartney)

== Charts ==
=== Weekly charts ===
Weekly chart performance for Revolver
Chart (1966–1968)	Peak position
Australian Kent Music Report	1
Canadian CHUM's Album Index	1
Canadian RPM Top LPs	18 (Note: RPM published its first Top LPs chart on 2 January 1967, almost five months after the release of Revolver.)
Finnish Albums Chart	1
Norwegian VG-lista Albums	14 (Note: The first VG-lista albums chart was published on 1 January 1967, almost five months after the release of Revolver.)
Swedish Kvällstoppen Chart	8
UK Record Retailer LPs Chart	1
US Billboard 200	1
West German Musikmarkt LP Hit-Parade	1

1987 reissue
Chart	Peak position
Dutch MegaChart Albums	57
UK Albums Chart	55
US Billboard Top Compact Disks	3

2009 reissue
Chart	Peak position
Australian ARIA Albums	36
Austrian Ö3 Top 40 Longplay (Albums)	48
Belgian Ultratop 200 Albums (Flanders)	23
Belgian Ultratop 200 Albums (Walloonia)	35
Danish Tracklisten Album Top-40	32
Dutch MegaChart Albums	81
Finnish Official Albums Chart	15
Italian FIMI Albums Chart	28
Japanese Oricon Albums Chart	26
New Zealand RIANZ Albums	20
Norwegian VG-lista Top 40 Albums	36
Portuguese AFP Top 50 Albums	21
Spanish PROMUSICAE Top 100 Albums	37
Swedish Sverigetopplistan Albums Top 60	13
Swiss Hitparade Albums Top 100	44
UK Albums Chart	9

2022 reissue
Chart (2022)	Peak position
Australian Albums (ARIA)	2
Hungarian Albums (MAHASZ)	34
Japanese Hot Albums (Billboard Japan)	4
Polish Albums (ZPAV)	20
Spanish Albums (Promusicae)	5
Swedish Albums (Sverigetopplistan)	4
UK Albums Chart	2

=== Year-end charts ===
Year-end chart performance
Chart (1966)	Ranking
US Billboard	8
US Cash Box	41
Chart (1967)	Ranking
US Billboard	56

== Certifications ==
Certifications for Revolver
Region	Certification	Certified units/sales
Australia (ARIA)	Platinum	70,000^{^}
Brazil (Pro-Música Brasil)	Gold	100,000^{*}
Canada (Music Canada)	2× Platinum	200,000^{^}
Germany	—	100,000
Italy (FIMI) sales since 2009	Gold	25,000^{‡}
New Zealand (RMNZ) Reissue	Platinum	15,000^{^}
United Kingdom (BPI)	3× Platinum	900,000^{^}
United States (RIAA)	5× Platinum	5,000,000^{^}
^{*} Sales figures based on certification alone.^{^} Shipments figures based on certification alone.^{‡} Sales+streaming figures based on certification alone.

^{†} BPI certification awarded only for sales since 1994.

== See also ==
- Outline of the Beatles
- The Beatles timeline
- The Beatles albums discography

== Sources ==
- Babiuk, Andy (2002). Beatles Gear: All the Fab Four's Instruments, from Stage to Studio. San Francisco, CA: Backbeat Books. ISBN 978-0-87930-731-8.
- Badman, Keith (2001). The Beatles Diary Volume 2: After the Break-Up 1970–2001. London: Omnibus Press. ISBN 978-0-7119-8307-6.
- The Beatles (2000). The Beatles Anthology. San Francisco, CA: Chronicle Books. ISBN 978-0-8118-2684-6.
- Bishop, Rand (2010). The Absolute Essentials of Songwriting Success – From Song Dog to Top Dog: Making It in the Music Business. Van Nuys, CA: Alfred Music Publishing. ISBN 978-0-7390-7191-5.
- Brackett, Nathan; Hoard, Christian, eds. (2004). The New Rolling Stone Album Guide (4th ed.). New York, NY: Fireside/Simon & Schuster. ISBN 0-7432-0169-8.
- Bray, Christopher (2014). 1965: The Year Modern Britain Was Born. London: Simon & Schuster. ISBN 978-1-84983-387-5.
- Brend, Mark (2005). Strange Sounds: Offbeat Instruments and Sonic Experiments in Pop. San Francisco, CA: Backbeat Books. ISBN 978-0-879308551.
- Bromell, Nick (2002). Tomorrow Never Knows: Rock and Psychedelics in the 1960s. Chicago, IL: University of Chicago Press. ISBN 0-226-07562-1.
- Brown, Peter; Gaines, Steven (2002) [1983]. The Love You Make: An Insider's Story of the Beatles. New York, NY: New American Library. ISBN 978-0-451-20735-7.
- Case, George (2010). Out of Our Heads: Rock 'n' Roll Before the Drugs Wore Off. Milwaukee, WI: Backbeat Books. ISBN 978-0-87930-967-1.
- Castleman, Harry; Podrazik, Walter J. (1976). All Together Now: The First Complete Beatles Discography 1961–1975. New York, NY: Ballantine Books. ISBN 0-345-25680-8.
- Clough, Matthew H.; Fallows, Colin, eds. (2010). Astrid Kirchherr: A Retrospective. Liverpool, UK: Liverpool University Press. ISBN 978-1-84631-477-3.
- DeRogatis, Jim (2003). Turn on Your Mind: Four Decades of Great Psychedelic Rock. Milwaukee, WI: Hal Leonard. ISBN 978-0-634-05548-5.
- Editors of Guitar World (2010). The Complete History of Guitar World: 30 Years of Music, Magic & Six-String Mayhem. Milwaukee, WI: Backbeat Books. ISBN 978-0-87930-992-3.
- The Editors of Rolling Stone (2002). Harrison. New York, NY: Rolling Stone Press. ISBN 978-0-7432-3581-5.
- Emerick, Geoff; Massey, Howard (2006). Here, There and Everywhere: My Life Recording the Music of the Beatles. New York, NY: Gotham Books. ISBN 978-1-59240-269-4.
- Everett, Walter (1999). The Beatles as Musicians: Revolver Through the Anthology. New York, NY: Oxford University Press. ISBN 978-0-19-512941-0.
- Everett, Walter (2009). The Foundations of Rock: From "Blue Suede Shoes" to "Suite: Judy Blue Eyes". New York, NY: Oxford University Press. ISBN 978-0-19-531024-5.
- Frontani, Michael R. (2007). The Beatles: Image and the Media. Jackson, MS: University Press of Mississippi. ISBN 978-1-57806-966-8.
- Gendron, Bernard (2002). Between Montmartre and the Mudd Club: Popular Music and the Avant-Garde. Chicago, IL: University of Chicago Press. ISBN 978-0-226-28737-9.
- Glynn, Stephen (2013). The British Pop Music Film: The Beatles and Beyond. Basingstoke, UK: Palgrave Macmillan. ISBN 978-0-230-39222-9.
- Gould, Jonathan (2007). Can't Buy Me Love: The Beatles, Britain and America. London: Piatkus. ISBN 978-0-7499-2988-6.
- Graff, Gary; Durchholz, Daniel, eds. (1999). MusicHound Rock: The Essential Album Guide. Farmington Hills, MI: Visible Ink Press. ISBN 1-57859-061-2.
- Harrington, Joe S. (2002). Sonic Cool: The Life & Death of Rock 'n' Roll. Milwaukee, WI: Hal Leonard. ISBN 978-0-634-02861-8.
- Harry, Bill (2004). The Ringo Starr Encyclopedia. London: Virgin Books. ISBN 0-7535-0843-5.
- Hertsgaard, Mark (1996). A Day in the Life: The Music and Artistry of the Beatles. London: Pan Books. ISBN 0-330-33891-9.
- Hodgson, Jay (2010). Understanding Records: A Field Guide to Recording Practice. New York, NY: Continuum. ISBN 978-1-4411-5607-5.
- Howard, David N. (2004). Sonic Alchemy: Visionary Music Producers and Their Maverick Recordings. Milwaukee, WI: Hal Leonard. ISBN 0-634-05560-7.
- Ingham, Chris (2006). The Rough Guide to the Beatles (2nd ed.). London: Rough Guides/Penguin. ISBN 978-1-84836-525-4.
- Inglis, Ian (2010). The Words and Music of George Harrison. Santa Barbara, CA: Praeger. ISBN 978-0-313-37532-3.
- Jones, Carys Wyn (2016) [2008]. The Rock Canon: Canonical Values in the Reception of Rock Albums. Abingdon, UK: Routledge. ISBN 978-0-7546-6244-0.
- Kruth, John (2015). This Bird Has Flown: The Enduring Beauty of Rubber Soul Fifty Years On. Milwaukee, WI: Backbeat Books. ISBN 978-1-61713-573-6.
- Larkin, Colin, ed. (2006). The Encyclopedia of Popular Music (4th ed.). London: Oxford University Press. ISBN 978-0-19-531373-4.
- Lavezzoli, Peter (2006). The Dawn of Indian Music in the West. New York, NY: Continuum. ISBN 0-8264-2819-3.
- Levy, Shawn (2002). Ready, Steady, Go!: Swinging London and the Invention of Cool. London: Fourth Estate. ISBN 978-1-84115-226-4.
- Lewisohn, Mark (2005) [1988]. The Complete Beatles Recording Sessions: The Official Story of the Abbey Road Years 1962–1970. London: Bounty Books. ISBN 978-0-7537-2545-0.
- Lewisohn, Mark (2010) [1992]. The Complete Beatles Chronicle: The Definitive Day-by-Day Guide to the Beatles' Entire Career. Chicago, IL: Chicago Review Press. ISBN 978-1-56976-534-0.
- MacDonald, Ian (2005). Revolution in the Head: The Beatles' Records and the Sixties (2nd rev. ed.). Chicago, IL: Chicago Review Press. ISBN 978-1-55652-733-3.
- Martin, George; with Pearson, William (1994). Summer of Love: The Making of Sgt. Pepper. London: Macmillan. ISBN 0-333-60398-2.
- Miles, Barry (1997). Paul McCartney: Many Years from Now. New York, NY: Henry Holt. ISBN 978-0-8050-5248-0.
- Miles, Barry (2001). The Beatles Diary Volume 1: The Beatles Years. London: Omnibus Press. ISBN 0-7119-8308-9.
- Miles, Barry (July 2006). "Revolver: The Tripping Point". Mojo. pp. 70–77.
- Millard, André (2012). Beatlemania: Technology, Business, and Teen Culture in Cold War America. Baltimore, MD: Johns Hopkins University Press. ISBN 978-1-4214-0525-4.
- Mojo Special Limited Edition: 1000 Days That Shook the World (The Psychedelic Beatles – 1 April 1965 to 26 December 1967). London: Emap. 2002.
- Norman, Philip (1996) [1981]. Shout!: The Beatles in Their Generation. New York, NY: Fireside. ISBN 0-684-83067-1.
- Perone, James E. (2012). The Album: A Guide to Pop Music's Most Provocative, Influential, and Important Creations. Santa Barbara, CA: Praeger. ISBN 978-0-313-37906-2.
- Philo, Simon (2015). British Invasion: The Crosscurrents of Musical Influence. Lanham, MD: Rowman & Littlefield. ISBN 978-0-8108-8626-1.
- Prendergast, Mark (2003). The Ambient Century: From Mahler to Moby – The Evolution of Sound in the Electronic Age. New York, NY: Bloomsbury. ISBN 1-58234-323-3.
- Reck, David B. (2009). "India/South India". In Titon, Jeff Todd (ed.). Worlds of Music: An Introduction to the Music of the World's Peoples (5th ed.). Belmont, CA: Schirmer Cengage Learning. ISBN 978-0-534-59539-5.
- Reising, Russell (2002). "Introduction: 'Of the beginning'". In Reising, Russell (ed.). "Every Sound There Is": The Beatles' Revolver and the Transformation of Rock and Roll. Farnham, UK: Ashgate Publishing. ISBN 978-0-7546-0557-7.
- Reising, Russell (2006). "Vacio Luminoso: 'Tomorrow Never Knows' and the Coherence of the Impossible". In Womack, Kenneth; Davis, Todd F. (eds.). Reading the Beatles: Cultural Studies, Literary Criticism, and the Fab Four. Albany, NY: State University of New York Press. ISBN 0-7914-6716-3.
- Reising, Russell; LeBlanc, Jim (2009). "Magical Mystery Tours, and Other Trips: Yellow submarines, newspaper taxis, and the Beatles' psychedelic years". In Womack, Kenneth (ed.). The Cambridge Companion to the Beatles. Cambridge, UK: Cambridge University Press. ISBN 978-0-521-68976-2.
- Riley, Tim (2002) [1988]. Tell Me Why – The Beatles: Album by Album, Song by Song, the Sixties and After. Cambridge, MA: Da Capo Press. ISBN 978-0-306-81120-3.
- Rodriguez, Robert (2012). Revolver: How the Beatles Reimagined Rock 'n' Roll. Milwaukee, WI: Backbeat Books. ISBN 978-1-61713-009-0.
- Savage, Jon (2015). 1966: The Year the Decade Exploded. London: Faber & Faber. ISBN 978-0-571-27763-6.
- Schaffner, Nicholas (1978). The Beatles Forever. New York, NY: McGraw-Hill. ISBN 0-07-055087-5.
- Sounes, Howard (2010). Fab: An Intimate Life of Paul McCartney. London: HarperCollins. ISBN 978-0-00-723705-0.
- Stanley, Bob (2014). Yeah! Yeah! Yeah!: The Story of Pop Music from Bill Haley to Beyoncé. New York, NY: W.W. Norton. ISBN 978-0-393-24269-0.
- Tillery, Gary (2011). Working Class Mystic: A Spiritual Biography of George Harrison. Wheaton, IL: Quest Books. ISBN 978-0-8356-0900-5.
- Turner, Steve (1999). A Hard Day's Write: The Stories Behind Every Beatles Song (2nd edn). New York, NY: Carlton/HarperCollins. ISBN 0-06-273698-1.
- Turner, Steve (2016). Beatles '66: The Revolutionary Year. New York, NY: Ecco. ISBN 978-0-06-247558-9.
- Unterberger, Richie (2006). The Unreleased Beatles: Music & Film. San Francisco, CA: Backbeat Books. ISBN 978-0-87930-892-6.
- Winn, John C. (2009). That Magic Feeling: The Beatles' Recorded Legacy, Volume Two, 1966–1970. New York, NY: Three Rivers Press. ISBN 978-0-307-45239-9.
- Womack, Kenneth (2007). Long and Winding Roads: The Evolving Artistry of the Beatles. New York, NY: Continuum. ISBN 978-0-8264-1746-6.
- Womack, Kenneth (2014). The Beatles Encyclopedia: Everything Fab Four. Santa Barbara, CA: ABC-CLIO. ISBN 978-0-313-39171-2.
