= Doctor Robert =

- Cover of the Northern Songs sheet music (licensed to Sonora Musikförlag)

Song by the Beatles
- Released: 5 August 1966 (UK: Revolver); 20 June 1966 (US: Yesterday and Today)
- Recorded: 17 and 19 April 1966
- Studio: EMI, London
- Genre: Psychedelic rock
- Length: 2:15
- Label: Parlophone
- Songwriter: Lennon–McCartney
- Producer: George Martin

"Doctor Robert" is a song by the English rock band the Beatles. It was released in 1966 on their album Revolver, apart from in North America, where it instead appeared on their Yesterday and Today album. The song was written by John Lennon and Paul McCartney (and credited to Lennon–McCartney), The Beatles recorded the track in seven takes on 17 April 1966, with vocals overdubbed on 19 April.

== Background and inspiration ==
According to musicologist Walter Everett, the lyrics to "Doctor Robert" "contained the most overt drug references of any published Beatles song" up to 1966, and he adds that in their recording of the song, the band "found musical ways to portray the doctor as a saint". The character is in keeping with the idea of a "Dr Feelgood", a physician who prescribed drugs such as amphetamines under the guise of legitimate medical practice. Lennon recalled that McCartney might have helped him write the "Well, well, well" bridge; despite this, according to music journalist Robert Fontenot, "most agree the song is almost all John's brainchild."

There's some fellow in New York, and in the States we'd hear people say: "You can get everything off him; any pills you want." It was a big racket, but a joke too about this fellow who cured everyone of everything with all these pills and tranquilizers, injections for this and that; he just kept New York high. That's what Doctor Robert is all about, just a pill doctor who sees you all right.

— Paul McCartney, 1967

In his book Beatles '66, author Steve Turner says that Lennon was possibly encouraged to write about a drug supplier after discussing "Mother's Little Helper" – a song from the Rolling Stones' just-released Aftermath album – with Mick Jagger, when Jagger had attended a recent session for Revolver. Turner cites Donovan's 1965 track "Candy Man" as another song that might have served as an example for Lennon. According to his friend Pete Shotton, when Lennon played him the acetate of "Doctor Robert", "he seemed beside himself with glee over the prospect of millions of record buyers innocently singing along."

Multiple theories have circulated about the identity of the real Dr Robert. Author Barry Miles identified him as Robert Freymann, a New York doctor known for dispensing vitamin B-12 shots laced with amphetamines to wealthy clientele. However, this is not consistent with the lyrics of the song, saying that Dr Robert "works for the national health". Aged around 60 in 1966, Freymann was a German-born Manhattan physician known to New York's artists and wealthier citizens for his vitamin B-12 injections, which also featured liberal doses of amphetamine. Freymann bragged that he could rattle off 100 names of his celebrity patients (reportedly including Jackie Kennedy) "in 10 minutes". (Note: Freymann, who authored a 1983 autobiography titled What's So Bad About Feeling Good?, lost his medical licence in 1975. The US government began cracking down on amphetamine distribution in the early 1970s after a series of deaths and an increasing number of addicts. Freymann said he thought speed was a "good drug" that had its reputation ruined by addicts.)

Turner, who also identifies Dr Robert as Freymann, writes that "some in the Beatles' circle thought Dr Robert was a reference to Robert Fraser" – an art gallery owner, "reliable source of pot and cocaine for London's hip set", and friend of the Beatles and the Rolling Stones. In a 1980 interview that Fontenot says "muddied the issue further", Lennon said the song was "mainly about drugs and pills" but: "It was about myself. I was the one that carried all the pills on tour."

In a 2009 article for the Spinner website, James Sullivan listed three other people who were speculated to be the inspiration for Dr Robert:

- Bob Dylan, who had introduced the Beatles to marijuana in the summer of 1964.
- Dr Robert MacPhail, a fictional character in Aldous Huxley's 1962 book Island. (Note: A notable advocate of LSD, Huxley documented his experiences with hallucinogenic drugs in books such as The Doors of Perception and was among the writers and philosophers the Beatles later included on their album cover for Sgt. Pepper's Lonely Hearts Club Band.)
- John Riley, a dentist acquaintance of John and Cynthia Lennon, George Harrison and his wife, Pattie Boyd. At a dinner party attended by Lennon and Harrison and their partners in March 1965, Riley had laced their coffee with LSD, providing the two Beatles with their first experience of the drug.

== Musical characteristics ==
"Doctor Robert" uses the keys of A major and B major, and its melody is in the Mixolydian mode based on B. The musical arrangement has staggered layering, with backing vocals starting in the second verse, the lead guitar entering just before the bridge, and the bridge itself featuring added harmonium and extra vocals. Lennon's lead vocal is automatically double tracked with each of the two slightly-out-of-phase tracks split onto separate stereo channels; creating a surrealistic effect supporting the lyric about drug use. An interesting feature is the suitably "blissful" modulation (on "Well, well, well, you're feeling fine") to the key of B on the bridge via an F♯^{7} pivot chord (VI^{7} in the old key of A and V^{7} in the new key of B).

The extended jam that lasts 43 seconds at the end was recorded, but it was removed and replaced with a fade-out. In the US mono mix of the song, as released on Yesterday and Today, Lennon appears to say "OK, Herb" at the very end of the track.

== Recording ==
The Beatles recorded "Doctor Robert" during the early part of the Revolver sessions. The session for the song took place on 17 April 1966 at EMI Studios (now Abbey Road Studios) in London. It was a relatively straightforward track to record, compared to the more experimental songs such as "Tomorrow Never Knows" and "Rain". The band achieved a satisfactory basic track after seven takes, with a line-up comprising Lennon on rhythm guitar, McCartney on bass, Harrison on maracas, and Ringo Starr on drums. Harrison then overdubbed lead guitar, treated with automatic double tracking (ADT) and fed through a Leslie speaker to enhance the sound, and Lennon added harmonium over the two bridges. McCartney played a piano part, although it was not retained on the finished recording.

Vocals were added to the track at the group's next session, on 19 April. These consisted of Lennon's lead vocal and McCartney's high harmony part, and Harrison supplying a third voice over the bridges. Lennon's vocal was also treated with ADT. The song was mixed in mono for its US release on 12 May and in stereo on 20 May. It was subsequently remixed in mono on 21 June.

== Release and reception ==
"Doctor Robert" was one of the three songs from the Revolver sessions, all written by Lennon, that were given to Capitol Records in early May 1966 for inclusion on the US release Yesterday and Today. In other countries, it appeared on Revolver, where it was sequenced as the fourth track on side two of the LP, between "For No One" and "I Want to Tell You". The album was released on 5 August, shortly before the Beatles commenced their final concert tour, in Chicago. Author Shawn Levy describes Revolver as pop music's "first true drug album" rather than merely a "record with some druggy insinuations", and he attributes this especially to Lennon's contributions.

In November, artist Alan Aldridge created a cartoon illustration of "Doctor Robert" and three other Revolver tracks to accompany a feature article on the Beatles in Woman's Mirror magazine. The illustration depicted Lennon dressed in a black cape that was partly drawn aside to reveal a set of shiny surgical instruments, although Aldridge's original design – which was overruled by the magazine's management for fear of offending potential advertisers – instead showed human limbs hanging inside the cape. Impressed with the artist's work, Lennon bought the original picture and proudly displayed it at his home. According to Aldridge, Lennon told him that he had "got it wrong, though" in depicting Dr Robert as a physician concerned with the human anatomy; instead, he was a "New York doctor who sold speed".

In his review of Revolver, Stephen Thomas Erlewine of AllMusic calls "Doctor Robert" Lennon's "most straightforward number" on the album, when compared to his other Revolver compositions "And Your Bird Can Sing", "She Said She Said", "I'm Only Sleeping" and "Tomorrow Never Knows". Richie Unterberger, in his review of the song for AllMusic, complimented the song's guitar pattern, being a possible influence from bands such as the Who. Unterberger also praises the vocal performances, particularly McCartney's high harmonies during the verses. Writing in his book Revolution in the Head, Ian MacDonald says that although the song is only a "minor" Beatles track, it is among the band's "most incisive pieces". He highlights the combination of Lennon's "caustic vocal", McCartney's "huckstering harmony in fourths" and Harrison's "double-tracked guitar, with its unique blend of sitar and country-and-western".

Reviewing the album for Mojo in 2002, Charles Shaar Murray grouped "Doctor Robert" with "And Your Bird Can Sing", "She Said She Said" and "I Want to Tell You" as guitar-based tracks that "glisten" with "glorious cascades of jangle". He identified this jangle quality as the Beatles' response to "what the Byrds had done with the Fabs' own proto-folk-rock sound on A Hard Day's Night". When Mojo released Revolver Reloaded in 2006, part of the magazine's series of CDs of Beatles albums covered track-by-track by modern artists, "Doctor Robert" was covered by Luke Temple.

== Personnel ==
According to Ian MacDonald, except where noted:

- John Lennon – double-tracked lead vocal, rhythm guitar, harmonium
- Paul McCartney – harmony vocal, bass guitar
- George Harrison – backing vocal, double-tracked lead guitar, maracas
- Ringo Starr – drums

== Sources ==
- Case, George (2010). Out of Our Heads: Rock 'n' Roll Before the Drugs Wore Off. Milwaukee, Wisconsin: Backbeat Books. ISBN 978-0-87930-967-1.
- Everett, Walter (1999). The Beatles as Musicians: Revolver Through the Anthology. New York City: Oxford University Press. ISBN 978-0-19-512941-0.
- Guesdon, Jean-Michel; Margotin, Philippe (2013). All the Songs: The Story Behind Every Beatles Release. New York City: Black Dog & Leventhal. ISBN 978-1-57912-952-1.
- Levy, Shawn (2002). Ready, Steady, Go!: Swinging London and the Invention of Cool. London: Fourth Estate. ISBN 978-1-84115-226-4.
- Lewisohn, Mark (2005) [1988]. The Complete Beatles Recording Sessions: The Official Story of the Abbey Road Years 1962–1970. London: Bounty Books. ISBN 978-0-7537-2545-0.
- MacDonald, Ian (1998). Revolution in the Head: The Beatles' Records and the Sixties. London: Pimlico. ISBN 978-0-7126-6697-8.
- Miles, Barry (1997). Paul McCartney: Many Years from Now. New York City: Henry Holt & Company. ISBN 0-8050-5249-6.
- Miles, Barry (2001). The Beatles Diary Volume 1: The Beatles Years. London: Omnibus Press. ISBN 0-7119-8308-9.
- Riley, Tim (2011). Lennon: The Man, the Myth, the Music – The Definitive Life. London: Random House. ISBN 978-0-7535-4020-6.
- Rodriguez, Robert (2012). Revolver: How the Beatles Reimagined Rock 'n' Roll. Milwaukee, Wisconsin: Backbeat Books. ISBN 978-1-61713-009-0.
- Savage, Jon (2015). 1966: The Year the Decade Exploded. London: Faber & Faber. ISBN 978-0-571-27763-6.
- Sheff, David (2000) [1981]. All We Are Saying: The Last Major Interview with John Lennon and Yoko Ono. New York City: St. Martin's Press. ISBN 0-312-25464-4.
- Turner, Steve (2016). Beatles '66: The Revolutionary Year. New York City: Ecco. ISBN 978-0-06-247558-9.
- Winn, John C. (2009). That Magic Feeling: The Beatles' Recorded Legacy, Volume Two, 1966–1970. New York City: Three Rivers Press. ISBN 978-0-307-45239-9.
