= Mark Hertsgaard =

American journalist (born 1956)

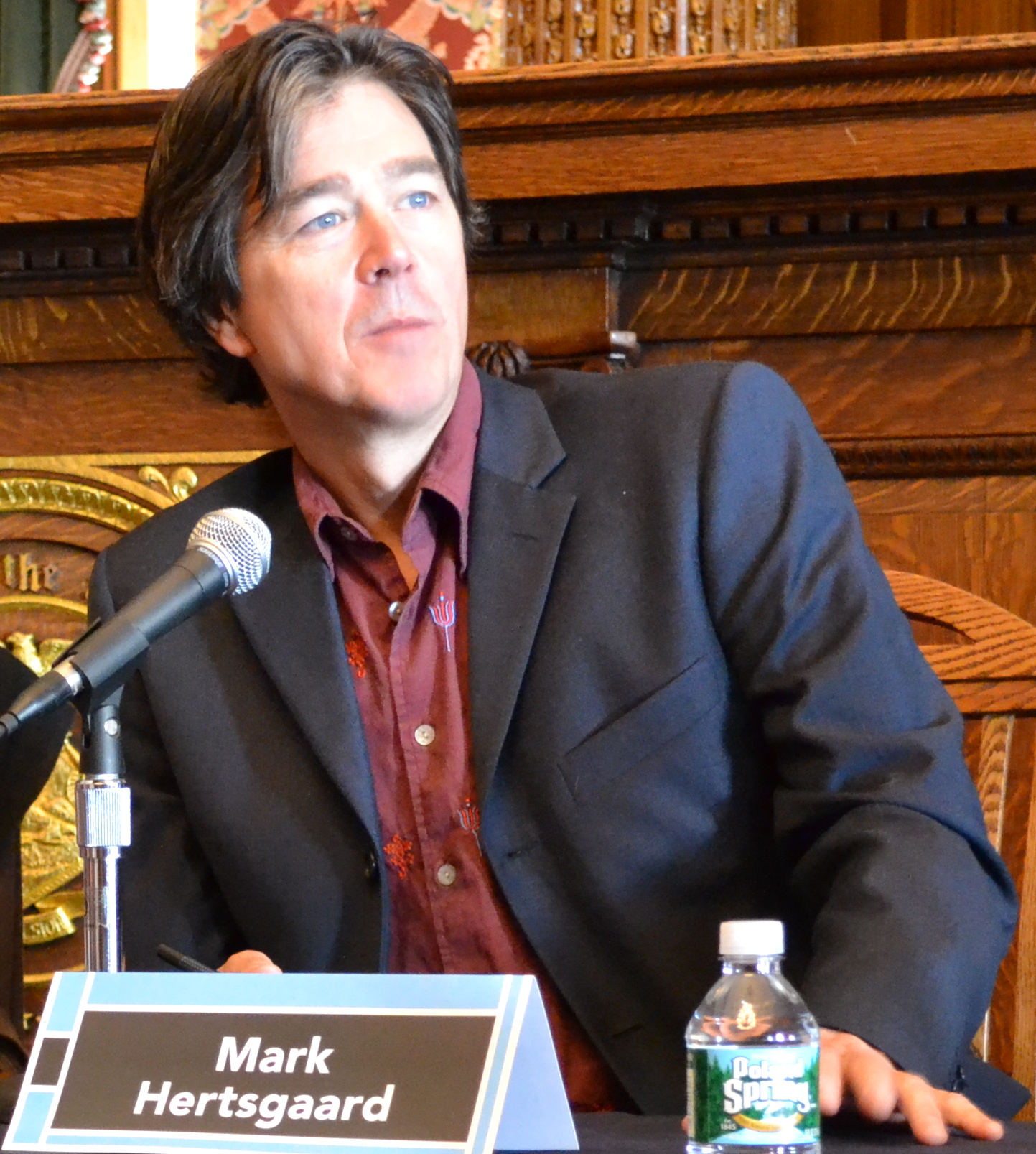
- Hertsgaard at the 2011 Brooklyn Book Festival
- Born: 1956 (age 69–70)
- Education: Johns Hopkins University
- Occupation: Journalist

Mark Hertsgaard (born 1956) is an American journalist, the co-founder and executive director of Covering Climate Now. He is the environment correspondent for The Nation, and the author of seven non-fiction books, including Earth Odyssey (1998) and Hot: Living Through the Next Fifty Years on Earth (2011).

He has covered climate change, politics, economics, the press, and music since 1989. His best-known work as an author is On Bended Knee: The Press and the Reagan Presidency (1988), which described the way the Reagan White House "deployed raw power and conventional wisdom to intimidate Washington's television newsrooms." Hertsgaard has also written for magazines and newspapers such as The Guardian, Vanity Fair, Scientific American,Time, Harper's, and Le Monde. He has been a commentator for the public radio programs Morning Edition, Marketplace, and Living on Earth, and taught writing at Johns Hopkins University and the University of California, Berkeley. Hertsgaard lives in San Francisco, California.

== Career ==
Hertsgaard received a B.A. degree in international studies from Johns Hopkins University in 1977 and was one of the founders of the Baltimore City Paper. According to his fellow Johns Hopkins alumnus Russ Smith, he worked in the Institute for Policy Studies in Washington, D.C., after graduation.

While compiling a feature article for The New Yorker in 1993, Hertsgaard broke the news that the three surviving members of the Beatles were going to issue previously unreleased music from the group's career, as part of their multimedia Anthology project. In addition, they were reuniting to work on new recordings. At this time, he was granted rare access to the band's EMI recording archives in London, gaining insight that informed his 1995 book A Day in the Life: The Music and Artistry of the Beatles. Writing in 2000, Nick Bromell, professor of English at the University of Massachusetts, Amherst and the founding editor of Boston Review, described A Day in the Life as "the best single book on the music of the Beatles".

During the 1990s, Hertsgaard's attention turned to the ecology of the Earth. He embarked upon a seven-year global tour to investigate the issue of environmental degradation. The journey spanned four continents, 19 countries and hundreds of interviews. This resulted in the book Earth Odyssey: Around the World in Search of Our Environmental Future (1999), which was reviewed favorably in The New York Times Book Review and Time magazine.

Hertsgaard also wrote about climate change adaptation in Hot: Living Through the Next Fifty Years on Earth (2011), published by Houghton Mifflin Harcourt. From 2011 to 2013, he was Schmidt Family Foundation Fellow at New America Foundation, researching the linked challenges of climate change, food security, poverty, and ecological agriculture.

In May 2013, during a neighborhood Mother's Day second line parade in New Orleans, 19 people were shot and wounded. The attack took place at the corner of Frenchmen Street and North Villere in the city's 7th Ward, where hundreds of people had gathered near the French Quarter. Victims included 10 men, seven women, a boy and a girl. Three people were seriously wounded. The Associated Press reported that three suspects were seen fleeing the scene. Police authorities classified it as part of the gun violence in the city. Hertsgaard has written about being one of the victims.(subscription required)

== Bibliography ==
- Bravehearts: Whistle Blowing in the Age of Snowden (2016)
- Hot: Living Through the Next Fifty Years on Earth (2010)
- The Eagle's Shadow: Why America Fascinates and Infuriates the World (2002)
- Earth Odyssey: Around the World in Search of Our Environmental Future (1998)
- A Day in the Life: The Music and Artistry of the Beatles (1995)
- On Bended Knee: The Press and the Reagan Presidency (1988)
- Nuclear Inc: The Men and Money (1983)
