= And Your Bird Can Sing =

1966 Beatles song

- Cover of the Northern Songs sheet music (licensed to Sonora Musikförlag)

Song by the Beatles
- Released: 5 August 1966 (UK: Revolver); 20 June 1966 (US: Yesterday and Today)
- Recorded: 26 April 1966
- Studio: EMI, London
- Genre: Psychedelia, psychedelic pop, power pop
- Length: 2:01
- Label: Parlophone
- Songwriter: Lennon–McCartney
- Producer: George Martin

"And Your Bird Can Sing" is a song by the English rock band the Beatles. It was released on their 1966 album Revolver, apart from in the United States and Canada, where it instead appeared on Yesterday and Today. The song was written mainly by John Lennon and credited to Lennon–McCartney. The recording features an extended dual-guitar melody, played by George Harrison and Paul McCartney, which anticipated the harmonised guitar arrangements commonly used by Southern rock, hard rock and heavy metal bands.

Lennon was later dismissive of "And Your Bird Can Sing", referring to it as "another of my throwaways ... fancy paper around an empty box". The song's working title was "You Don't Get Me". Its oblique lyrics and Lennon's failure to reveal their meaning have encouraged several interpretations. One popular theory is that Lennon was addressing Frank Sinatra in response to a hagiographic article on the singer in Esquire magazine; another contends that the song was directed at Mick Jagger with reference to Marianne Faithfull.

The Beatles first recorded the track in the style of the Byrds. This discarded version was released on the 1996 outtakes compilation Anthology 2 and includes the sound of Lennon and McCartney laughing their way through a vocal overdub and unable to sing. This version of the song was included (without the laughing overdub) on the second disc of the 2022 Super Deluxe Edition of Revolver.

== Background and inspiration ==
Aside from dismissing it as a substandard work, John Lennon never discussed "And Your Bird Can Sing". His first wife Cynthia recalled that the song was inspired by her presenting Lennon with a clockwork bird inside a gilded cage, wrapped in gift paper, apart from the wind-up mechanism. She wound up the bird as she handed the present to Lennon so that it sang, leaving him with "an expression of sheer disbelief on his face" as he removed the wrapping paper. According to author Kenneth Womack, Lennon viewed the caged imitation bird as a metaphor for his marriage and a reflection of Cynthia's inability to understand him. The song's working title was "You Don't Get Me".

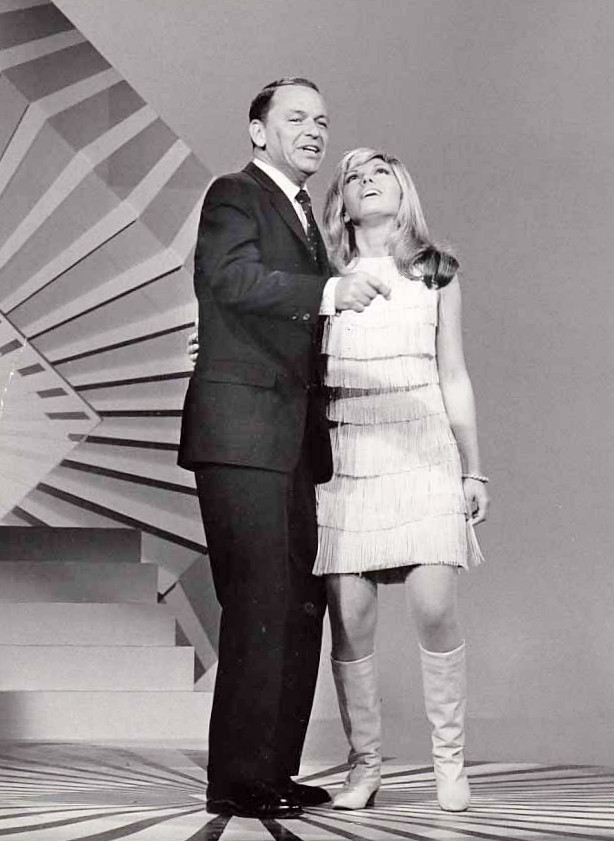
One of the most popular interpretations of Lennon's lyrics is as a riposte to Frank Sinatra (pictured performing in a 1966 TV special with his daughter Nancy).

The lack of an explanation from Lennon himself has led others to speculate on its meaning. In his 2007 book Can't Buy Me Love, Jonathan Gould says that Lennon wrote "And Your Bird Can Sing" about Frank Sinatra after reading a 15,000 word profile on the singer in Esquire magazine. Written by Gay Talese, the article detailed Sinatra's wealth and power, describing him as "the fully emancipated male ... the man who can have anything he wants", and repeatedly mentioned his use of the word "bird" to mean a penis. Talese quoted a press release for Sinatra's upcoming TV special, which stated it was a show for those who were "tired of kid singers wearing mops of hair thick enough to hide a crate of melons", and he said Sinatra aimed to "communicate his talent to some rock-and-rollers – in a sense, he was battling The Beatles". Gould adds that while Lennon would have been amused to read about Sinatra having an assistant dedicated to maintaining his 60 "remarkably convincing" hairpieces, Lennon was piqued at the recognition afforded Sinatra, at the Beatles' expense, in the recent 1966 Grammy Awards. (Note: Sinatra won in the categories Male Vocal of the Year and Album of the Year, beating the Beatles' "Yesterday" and Help!, respectively. The band's failure to win any of the ten Grammy Awards for which they were nominated led Alan Livingston, the head of Capitol Records, to officially protest the results, saying that "Yesterday" being passed over for Song of the Year "makes a mockery of the whole event".)

Singer Marianne Faithfull said the song was addressed to Mick Jagger and written about her since she was Jagger's girlfriend (or "bird" in English slang) at the time. That interpretation was proposed by journalist Richard Simpson, and others have cited it as an example of the perceived rivalry between the Beatles and Jagger's band, the Rolling Stones. According to Beatles biographer Steve Turner, Faithfull's interpretation is incorrect since she was not in a relationship with Jagger until later in 1966. Some writers have speculated that Lennon's lyrics were directed at Paul McCartney. According to Rolling Stone, and supported by Womack, the line "You say you've seen seven wonders" could be a reference to a comment McCartney made in 1964 when the Beatles were smoking cannabis with Bob Dylan in New York. Under the effects of the drug, McCartney declared that he knew the answer to the questions of existence and told Beatles roadie Mal Evans to write down any statements he made on the subject. McCartney was later dismayed to discover that, rather than the ingenious declarations he recalled, his realisations amounted to the phrase "There are seven levels."

Photographer Robert Whitaker based his photo "Birdcage" on the song's lyrics. The photo shows George Harrison's head and shoulders inside a birdcage with the cage door open. The cage was among the props assembled by Whitaker for the 25 March 1966 shoot that produced another photo – featuring the Beatles in butchers' coats and covered in dismembered dolls and raw meat – that was selected for the cover of the US LP Yesterday and Today.

== Arrangement and recording ==
"And Your Bird Can Sing" contains an extended harmony-lead guitar melody played by Harrison and McCartney. The latter recalled that he and Harrison wrote the part during the recording sessions. McCartney also stated that he helped with the lyrics and attributed the song "80–20" to Lennon.

The Beatles first recorded the song on 20 April 1966 at EMI Studios (subsequently Abbey Road Studios) in London. The arrangement was markedly similar to the Byrds' sound, featuring lush vocal harmonies and jangle-style guitars, with Harrison playing his Rickenbacker 360/12 electric guitar. While carrying out vocal overdubs on the track, Lennon and McCartney were overcome by hysterical laughter and unable to sing their parts. Later released on the 1996 Anthology 2 outtakes compilation album, the performance includes the pair giggling, uttering spoken asides, and whistling along with the melody. In his liner notes for the album, Beatles historian Mark Lewisohn comments that the tapes do not indicate the source of the laughter. (Note: Beatles biographer Robert Rodriguez writes that, in line with Gould's interpretation and Sinatra's idea of a "bird", Lennon and McCartney's amusement is easy to comprehend: "And your bird can swing, baby!")

The group re-recorded the song on 26 April. Whereas the first version was in the key of D major, the remake was played in E major, with the guitarists applying capos to allow for the two-semitone adjustment. Beatles biographer Robert Rodriguez and music critic Richie Unterberger speculate that the remake was motivated by the Beatles' realisation that the 20 April recording was overly derivative of the Byrds and that this aspect had possibly come about through a pun on the word "bird".

The session began with Lennon's tongue-in-cheek introduction, "Okay, boys – quite brisk, moderato, foxtrot", and the group performing a rhythm track that Lewisohn terms "very heavy", before the mood was lightened in subsequent takes. The twin lead-guitar approach replaced the Rickenbacker jangle from the first version, and the vocal arrangement was pared down to feature mainly Lennon. Harrison and McCartney used their Epiphone Casinos for the lead-guitar lines. In the description of Charles Shaar Murray, the completed track is nevertheless one of the guitar-based songs on Revolver that "glisten" with "cascades of jangle", as the Beatles responded to "what The Byrds had done with the Fabs' own proto-folk-rock sound on A Hard Day's Night".

The band used Take 10 as their basic track before overdubs. The latter included McCartney's bass guitar and Ringo Starr adding cymbal and extra hi-hat to augment his drum part. Since the group liked the stuttering bass notes that McCartney had played at the end of take 6, the latter portion was spliced onto the master to close the recording.

== Release ==
"And Your Bird Can Sing" was one of the three songs intended for Revolver that the Beatles reluctantly gave to Capitol Records for inclusion on the North American LP Yesterday and Today. The song was mixed for that purpose on 14 May. It was sequenced as the opening track on side two of the LP, which was released on 20 June in the United States after Capitol had been pressured into withdrawing Whitaker's "butcher sleeve" cover.

The song was remixed on 6 June, towards the end of the Revolver sessions. "And Your Bird Can Sing" was sequenced as the second track on side two of the album and issued in the United Kingdom on 5 August. Its omission from the eleven-song US Revolver ensured that Lennon was under-represented on the LP. Since the three new songs on Yesterday and Today were all his, Capitol's version of Revolver included just two songs for which he was the principal writer.

The Beatles did not perform any of the songs from Revolver during their August 1966 US tour. While acknowledging that several of the tracks would have been impossible to reproduce in concert, Unterberger says that guitar-based songs such as "And Your Bird Can Sing" would have been easy to arrange for live performance. He views its omission as indicative of the band's mindset that touring had become a futile exercise but rues that they did not seek to regain enthusiasm by playing recent material that would have suited their stage act. Recalling the album's release in his 1977 book The Beatles Forever, Nicholas Schaffner commented that whereas the group's more traditional fans warmed to McCartney's new songs, "Lennon's numbers were a different kettle of fish entirely" due to their oblique lyrics. While he also viewed the music of "And Your Bird Can Sing" as a natural choice for live performance, relative to the more complex recordings on Revolver, he added:

But what was/is one to make of lines like "You say you've seen seven wonders / And your bird is green / But you don't see me ...?" Perhaps John was still under the influence of Bob Dylan, who at the time seemed to take pleasure in confounding dissectors of his "message" with cryptic lyrics that made no sense at all.

== Reception ==
In 2006, Mojo placed "And Your Bird Can Sing" at number 41 on its list of "The 101 Greatest Beatles Songs". In his commentary on the track, English academic Toby Litt admired its Indian drone quality and the raga influence in the guitar melody. He said that the riff was perhaps "the most baroque that pop music ever came up with", adding: "Slow it down and it could be a Bach chorale." The following year, Q magazine ranked the song at number 6 on its list "The 20 Greatest Guitar Tracks". In October 2008, Guitar World magazine ranked Harrison's playing on the song at number 69 on its list of the "100 Greatest Guitar Solos".

In his 50th anniversary review for Revolver, Steve Marinucci of Billboard described "And Your Bird Can Sing" as "an incredibly ambitious song, highlighted by a superb guitar solo by George Harrison". Thomas Ward of AllMusic describes the song as one of the finest on Revolver. He writes that although Lennon was indifferent to the song and the lyrics were "probably nonsense", it's "wildly entertaining" and complements the vocal performances. Ward further praises Harrison's guitar playing, the "lovely" melody and the "unorthodox, yet ingenious bridge". Rob Sheffield of Rolling Stone writes that despite Lennon's dislike of it, "And Your Bird Can Sing" is "one of his best songs ever", describing it as "scathing ... yet also empathetic and friendly".

== Legacy ==
"And Your Bird Can Sing" was used as the theme song for the Beatles' cartoon series during its third season. It was one of the 45 playable tracks included in the 2009 release of the music video game The Beatles: Rock Band. In addition to the song's lyrics being among the most widely and diversely interpreted in the Beatles' discography, the Anthology 2 recording is one of the band's most celebrated outtakes.

The use of dual, harmonised lead guitar parts on the track was still in its infancy in 1966. The editors of Guitar World comment that this type of pop-rock arrangement would later be popularised by Southern rock bands such as the Allman Brothers Band and Lynyrd Skynyrd, as well as hard rock and metal acts such as Thin Lizzy, Boston and Iron Maiden. American guitarist Joe Walsh sought to master the solo on "And Your Bird Can Sing", believing that Harrison had played it in a single take. Walsh, who married the sister of Starr's second wife, Barbara Bach, said he only discovered that it consisted of two parts when discussing with Starr how he had spent years labouring over the solo. Walsh concluded, "I think I’m the only guy who can play it – including George."

"And Your Bird Can Sing" was included on the Beatles' 2012 iTunes Store compilation Tomorrow Never Knows, which the band's website described as a collection of "the Beatles' most influential rock songs". In his commentary for Mojo, Litt identified the track as "the birth of all powerpop, from Big Star through Cheap Trick to Fountains of Wayne" and the inspiration for other artists that "use jangle to attack". Steve Turner credits Revolver with "open[ing] the doors to psychedelic rock (or acid rock)" and says that the primitive means by which it was recorded (on four-track equipment) inspired the work that artists such as Pink Floyd, Genesis, Yes and the Electric Light Orchestra were able to achieve with advances in studio technology. In 2002, Genesis drummer and vocalist Phil Collins said it was his favourite Beatles album and highlighted "And Your Bird Can Sing" as "one of the best songs ever written, and it's only a minute and a half long". (Note: Collins added: "There is also a great consistency throughout the record. With vinyl albums, you would have big moments like the end of side one, the beginning of side two, and the end of the record, and with something like Revolver you would listen to it with great care, from the beginning to the end.")

Jim Reid of the Jesus and Mary Chain contributed a recording of the song to Revolver Reloaded, a CD that accompanied Mojo's July 2006 issue celebrating the fortieth anniversary of the Beatles' album. The magazine's editors commented that Reid's version suggests that Phil Spector would have been an ideal choice to produce "arguably the finest UK band of the '80s". Among the other artists who have covered "And Your Bird Can Sing" are the Flamin' Groovies, the Charles River Valley Boys, Spanky and Our Gang, the Jam, Guadalcanal Diary, Matthew Sweet and Susanna Hoffs, Les Fradkin, R. Stevie Moore and I Fight Dragons.

== Personnel ==
According to Ian MacDonald, except where noted:

- John Lennon – lead vocal, rhythm guitar, handclaps
- Paul McCartney – harmony vocal, bass, lead guitar, handclaps
- George Harrison – harmony vocal, lead guitar, handclaps
- Ringo Starr – drums, tambourine, handclaps

== Sources ==
- Everett, Walter (1999). The Beatles as Musicians: Revolver through the Anthology. New York, NY: Oxford University Press. ISBN 0-19-512941-5.
- Gould, Jonathan (2007). Can't Buy Me Love: The Beatles, Britain, and America. New York, NY: Three Rivers Press. ISBN 978-0-307-35338-2.
- Lewisohn, Mark (2005) [1988]. The Complete Beatles Recording Sessions: The Official Story of the Abbey Road Years 1962–1970. London: Bounty Books. ISBN 978-0-7537-2545-0.
- MacDonald, Ian (2005). Revolution in the Head: The Beatles' Records and the Sixties (2nd rev. edn). Chicago, IL: Chicago Review Press. ISBN 978-1-55652-733-3.
- Miles, Barry (2001). The Beatles Diary Volume 1: The Beatles Years. London: Omnibus Press. ISBN 0-7119-8308-9.
- Riley, Tim (2011). Lennon: The Man, the Myth, the Music – The Definitive Life. London: Random House. ISBN 978-0-7535-4020-6.
- Rodriguez, Robert (2012). Revolver: How the Beatles Reimagined Rock 'n' Roll. Milwaukee, WI: Backbeat Books. ISBN 978-1-61713-009-0.
- Savage, Jon (2015). 1966: The Year the Decade Exploded. London: Faber & Faber. ISBN 978-0-571-27763-6.
- Schaffner, Nicholas (1978). The Beatles Forever. New York, NY: McGraw-Hill. ISBN 0-07-055087-5.
- Turner, Steve (2016). Beatles '66: The Revolutionary Year. New York, NY: Ecco. ISBN 978-0-06-247558-9.
- Unterberger, Richie (2006). The Unreleased Beatles: Music & Film. San Francisco, CA: Backbeat Books. ISBN 978-0-87930-892-6.
- Winn, John C. (2009). That Magic Feeling: The Beatles' Recorded Legacy, Volume Two, 1966–1970. New York, NY: Three Rivers Press. ISBN 978-0-307-45239-9.
- Womack, Kenneth (2014). The Beatles Encyclopedia: Everything Fab Four. Santa Barbara, CA: ABC-CLIO. ISBN 978-0-313-39171-2.
