= Shawn Levy (writer) =

American film critic and author (born 1961)

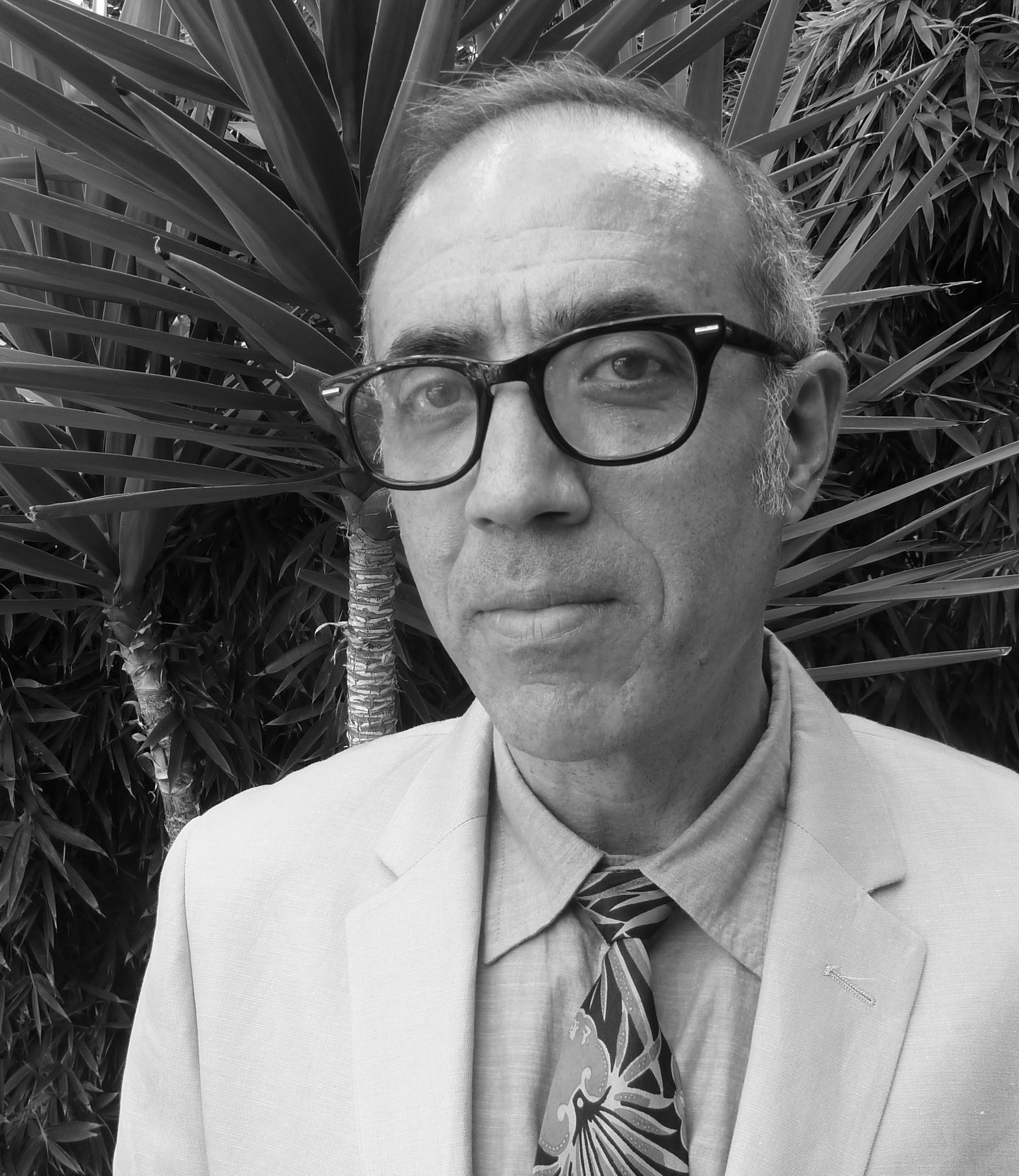
- Levy in 2014
- Born: Shawn Anthony Levy; October 22, 1961 (age 65); Brooklyn, New York, U.S.
- Education: University of Pennsylvania; University of California, Irvine
- Occupations: Film critic; author
- Writing career
- Years active: 1997–present
- Website: shawnlevy.com

Shawn Anthony Levy (born October 22, 1961) is an American film critic, author, podcaster, and blogger.

== Early life and education ==
Levy was born in Brooklyn on October 22, 1961 to a Jewish family.

He was educated at Lawrence High School and the University of Pennsylvania and the University of California, Irvine.

== Career ==
Levy was the film critic of The Oregonian newspaper in Portland, Oregon, from 1997 to 2012 and of KGW-TV, Portland's NBC affiliate, from 2009 to 2016. He is a former Senior Editor of American Film and a former Associate Editor of Box Office. His work has appeared in major newspapers and magazines in the United States and England including The New York Times, the Los Angeles Times, the San Francisco Chronicle, The Guardian, The Independent, Film Comment, Movieline, Premiere, and Sight & Sound.

Levy has written biographies of film actors Paul Newman, Clint Eastwood, Robert De Niro and Jerry Lewis, a history of the famed hotel Chateau Marmont, and books on pop culture scenes and phenomena such as the Rat Pack, 1950s film-making in Rome, and 1960s Swinging London. In 2023, his original narrative podcast, "Glitter and Might: The Lew Wasserman Story," was released by Audacy. In 2025, it was announced that he was working on a biography of David Lynch.

He is an active member of Portland's soccer community and serves on the board of Operation Pitch Invasion.

== Bibliography ==
- King of Comedy: The Life and Art of Jerry Lewis (1996) ISBN 978-0-312-16878-0
- Rat Pack Confidential: Frank, Dean, Sammy, Peter, Joey, and the Last Great Show Biz Party (1998) ISBN 978-0-385-49576-9
- Ready, Steady, Go! The Smashing Rise and Giddy Fall of Swinging London (2002) ISBN 978-0-7679-0588-6
- The Last Playboy: The High Life of Porfirio Rubirosa (2005) ISBN 978-0-00-717060-9
- Paul Newman: A Life (2009) ISBN 978-0-307-35375-7
- The Rat Pack: Limited Edition (2010) ISBN 978-0956648709
- De Niro: A Life (2014) ISBN 978-0307716781
- Dolce Vita Confidential: Fellini, Loren, Pucci, Paparazzi, and the Swinging High Life of 1950s Rome (2016) ISBN 978-0393247589
- The Castle on Sunset: Life, Death, Love, Art, and Scandal at Hollywood's Chateau Marmont (2019) ISBN 978-0385543163
- A Year in the Life of Death: Poems Inspired by the Obit Pages of The New York Times (2021) ISBN 978-1938753411
- In on the Joke: The Original Queens of Stand-Up Comedy (2022) ISBN 978-0385545785
- Glitter & Might: The Lew Wasserman Story(podcast) (2023)
- Clint: The Man and the Movies (2025) ISBN 978-0063251021
