= Nick Bromell =

American author and educator

Nick Bromell (born 1950) is an American author and educator in the field of intellectual history. He is the professor of American studies at University of Massachusetts Amherst. In his writing and research, he specializes in media and public opinion, race and ethnicity, and democracy and governance. He was the founding editor of the political and literary magazine Boston Review.

Bromell's work has been published in numerous academic and literary journals, and he has also written articles for mainstream publications such as The Boston Globe, Harper's, and Salon. He is the author of the books By the Sweat of the Brow: Literature and Labor in Antebellum American Culture (1992), Tomorrow Never Knows: Rock and Psychedelics in the 1960s (2000), and The Time is Always Now: Black Thought and the Transformation of U.S. Democracy (2013). His book The Powers of Dignity: The Black Political Philosophy of Frederick Douglass is due for publication in 2021.

== Education and career ==
Bromell was born in rural Virginia. He graduated from Amherst College in Massachusetts with a B.A. in classics and philosophy. He received a Ph.D. in English and American literature from Stanford University in California, where he specialized in American antebellum literature and culture and American intellectual history and popular culture.

He went on to teach at Harvard and Princeton universities. In 1980, he became the founding editor of the relaunched Boston Review.

In 1987, Bromell joined the English faculty at University of Massachusetts Amherst. He is a former president of the New England chapter of the American Studies Association.

== Works ==
Bromell's research work has been published in many academic journals, including American Quarterly, American Literary History, American Literature, Journal of the Society for American Music, and Political Theory. He is the author of three books: By the Sweat of the Brow: Literature and Labor in Antebellum American Culture (University of Chicago Press, 1992); Tomorrow Never Knows: Rock and Psychedelics in the 1960s (University of Chicago Press, 2000); and The Time is Always Now: Black Thought and the Transformation of U.S. Democracy (Oxford University Press, 2013). He also edited the book of essays A Political Companion to W.E.B. Du Bois (University Press of Kentucky, 2018).

He has written for Salon and contributed articles on abolitionist Frederick Douglass and Scooter Libby to The American Scholar. His articles and essays have also appeared in The Boston Globe, Harper's, Raritan, The Sewanee Review, and The Georgia Review, and online at AlterNet. In February 2003, Bromell was among the guests discussing psychedelic drugs on the Infinite Mind radio show, presented by the Multidisciplinary Association for Psychedelic Studies. In 2008, he was one of the three panelists at a public forum held at Stanford's Kresge Auditorium to discuss the influence of the Beatles and their self-titled double album (also known as the "White Album"), 40 years after its release.

Bromell has been an affiliate scholar of the Center for American Progress. In 2016, he was awarded a Guggenheim Fellowship in the field of American literature. At that time, he was also named a 2016–17 fellow of the Charles Warren Center for Studies in American History at Harvard. As of 2016, he was writing a book about Douglass's political philosophy. Titled The Powers of Dignity: The Black Political Philosophy of Frederick Douglass, the book is due to be published by Duke University Press in February 2021.
