= Recording practices of the Beatles =

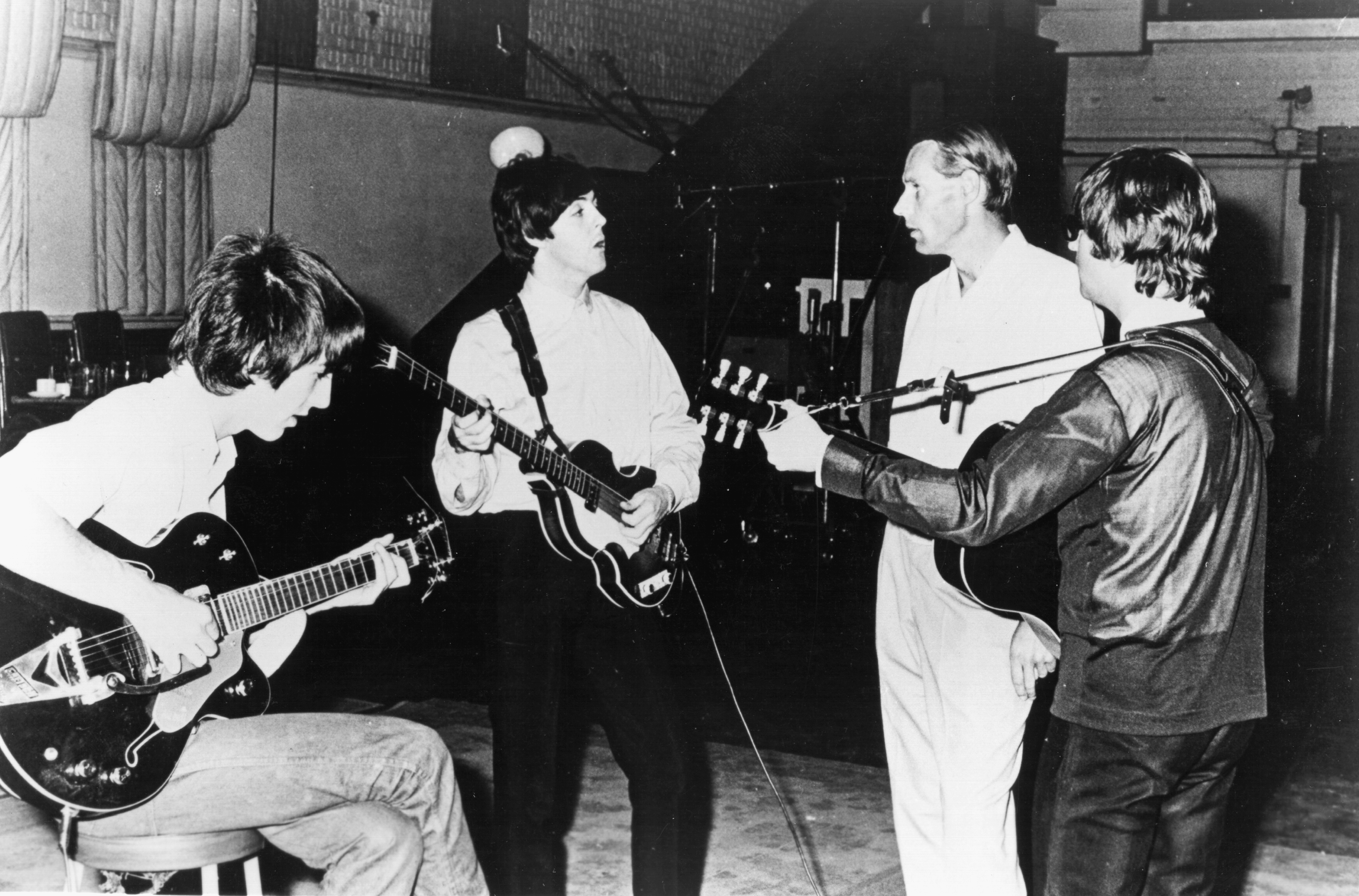
EMI Studios, 11 August 1964: left to right: George Harrison, Paul McCartney, George Martin and John Lennon.

The studio practices of the Beatles evolved during the 1960s and, in some cases, influenced the way popular music was recorded. Some of the effects they employed were sampling, artificial double tracking (ADT) and the elaborate use of multitrack recording machines. They also used classical instruments on their recordings and guitar feedback. The group's attitude towards the recording process was summed up by Paul McCartney: "We would say, 'Try it. Just try it for us. If it sounds crappy, OK, we'll lose it. But it might just sound good.' We were always pushing ahead: Louder, further, longer, more, different."

== Studios ==
=== EMI (Abbey Road) ===
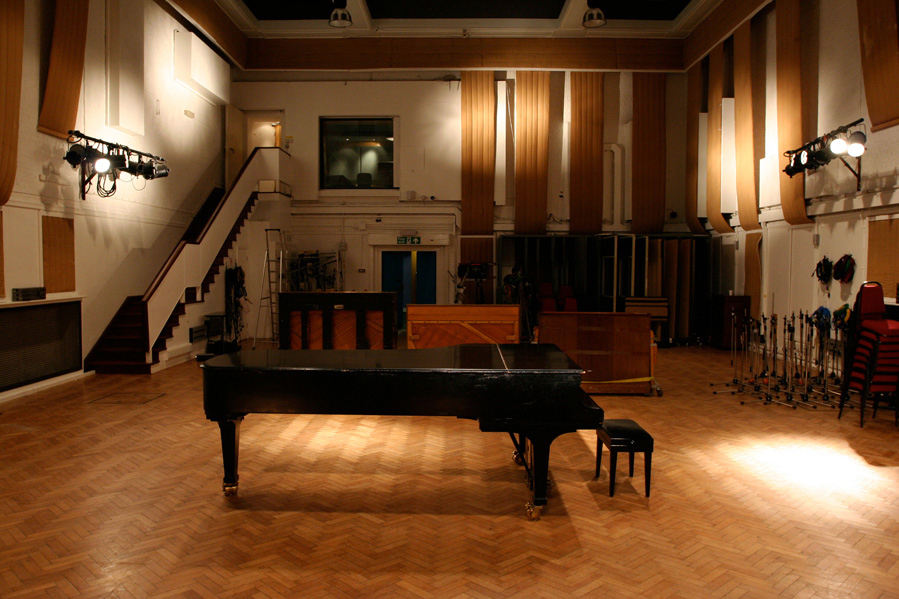
Abbey Road Studio Two.

In the early part of the 1960s, EMI's Abbey Road Studios was equipped with EMI-made British Tape Recorders (BTR) which were developed in 1948, as copies of German wartime recorders. The BTR was a twin-track, valve-based machine. When recording on the twin-track machine there was very little opportunity for overdubbing; the recording was essentially that of a live music performance.

The first two Beatles albums, Please Please Me and With the Beatles, were recorded on the EMI BTR-2 in mono and BTR-3, a 2-track machine; with the introduction of 4-track machines in 1963 (the first 4-track Beatles recording was "I Want to Hold Your Hand") there came a change in the way recordings were made—tracks could be built up layer by layer, encouraging experimentation in the multitrack recording process.

In 1968, 8-track recorders became available, but Abbey Road was somewhat slow in adopting the new technology and a number of Beatles tracks (including "Hey Jude") were recorded in other London studios to take advantage of the flexibility of 8-track machines.

The Beatles' album Abbey Road was the only one to be recorded using a transistorised mixing console, the EMI TG12345, rather than the earlier EMI REDD valve (tube) consoles. Let It Be was recorded largely at the Beatles' own Apple Studios, using borrowed REDD valve consoles from EMI after the designer Magic Alex (Alex Mardas) failed to come up with a suitable desk for the studio. Engineer Geoff Emerick has said that the transistorised console played a large part in shaping overall sound of Abbey Road, lacking the aggressive edge of the valve consoles.

== Personnel ==
=== The Beatles ===
The success of the Beatles meant that EMI gave them a blank check access to the Abbey Road studios—they were not charged for studio time and could spend as long as they wanted working on music. Starting around 1965 with the Rubber Soul sessions, the Beatles increasingly used the studio as an instrument in itself, spending long hours experimenting and writing. The Beatles demanded a lot from the studio; Lennon allegedly wanted to know why the bass on a certain Wilson Pickett record far exceeded the bass on any Beatles records. This prompted EMI engineer Geoff Emerick to try new techniques for "Paperback Writer". He explains that the song "was the first time the bass sound had been heard in all its excitement [...] To get the loud bass sound Paul played a different bass, a Rickenbacker. Then we boosted it further by using a loudspeaker as a microphone. We positioned it directly in front of the bass speaker and the moving diaphragm of the second speaker made the electric current."

Combined with this was the conscious desire to be different. McCartney said, "Each time we just want to do something different. After Please Please Me we decided we must do something different for the next song... Why should we ever want to go back? That would be soft." The desire to "do something different" pushed EMI's recording technology through overloading the mixing desk as early as 1964 in tracks such as "Eight Days a Week" even at this relatively early date, the track begins with a gradual fade-in, a device which had rarely been employed in rock music. Paul McCartney would create more sophisticated bass lines by overdubbing in counterpoint to Beatles tracks that were previously completed. Also overdubbed vocals were used for new artistic purposes on "Julia" with John Lennon overlapping the end of one vocal phrase with the beginning of his next. On "I Want to Hold Your Hand" (1963) the Beatles innovated using organ sounding guitars which was achieved by extreme compression on Lennon's rhythm guitar.

Engineers and other Abbey Road staff have reported that the Beatles would try to take advantage of accidental occurrences in the recording process; "I Feel Fine" and "It's All Too Much"'s feedback and "Long, Long, Long"'s resonating glass bottle (towards the end of the track) are examples of this. In other instances the group deliberately toyed with situations and techniques which would foster chance effects, such as the live (and thereby unpredictable) mixing of a UK radio broadcast into the fade of "I Am the Walrus" or the chaotic assemblage of "Tomorrow Never Knows".

The Beatles' song "You Like Me Too Much" has one of the earliest examples of this technique: the Beatles recorded the electric piano through a Hammond B-3's rotating Leslie speaker, a 122 or 122RV, a trick they would come back to over and over again. (At the end of the intro, the switching off of the Leslie is audible.) Also on "Tomorrow Never Knows" the vocal was sent through a Leslie speaker. Although not the first recorded vocal use of a Leslie speaker, the technique would later be used by the Grateful Dead, Cream, The Moody Blues and others.

All of the Beatles had Brenell tape recorders at home, which allowed them to record outside of the studio. Some of their home experiments were used at Abbey Road and ended up on finished masters, in particular on "Tomorrow Never Knows".

=== Session musicians ===
Although strings were commonly used on pop recordings, George Martin's suggestion that a string quartet be used for the recording of "Yesterday" marked a major departure for the Beatles. McCartney recalled playing it to the other Beatles and Starr saying it did not make sense to have drums on the track and Lennon and Harrison saying there was no point having extra guitars. George Martin suggested a solo acoustic guitar and a string quartet.

As the Beatles' musical work developed, particularly in the studio, classical instruments were increasingly added to tracks. Lennon recalled the two way education; the Beatles and Martin learning from each other – George Martin asking if they had heard an oboe and the Beatles saying, "No, which one's that one?"

Geoff Emerick documented the change in attitude to pop, as opposed to classical music during the Beatles career. In EMI at the start of the 1960s, balance engineers were either "classical" or "pop". Similarly, Paul McCartney recalled a large "Pop/Classical" switch on the mixing console. Emerick also noted a tension between the classical and pop people – even eating separately in the canteen. The tension was also increased as it was the money from pop sales that paid for the classical sessions.

Emerick was the engineer on "A Day in the Life", which used a 40-piece orchestra and recalled "dismay" amongst the classical musicians when they were told to improvise between the lowest and highest notes of their instruments (whilst wearing rubber noses). However, Emerick also saw a change in attitude at the end of the recording when everyone present (including the orchestra) broke into spontaneous applause. Emerick recalled the evening as the "passing of the torch" between the old attitudes to pop music and the new.

== Techniques ==
=== Guitar feedback ===
Audio feedback was used by composers such as Robert Ashley in the early 60s. Ashley's The Wolfman, which uses feedback extensively, was composed early in 1964, though not heard publicly until the autumn of that year. In the same year as Ashley's feedback experiments, The Beatles song "I Feel Fine", recorded on 18 October, starts with a feedback note produced by plucking the A-note on McCartney's bass guitar, which was picked up on Lennon's semi-acoustic guitar. It was distinguished from its predecessors by a more complex guitar sound, particularly in its introduction, a sustained plucked electric note that after a few seconds swelled in volume and buzzed like an electric razor. This was the very first use of feedback on a rock record. Speaking in one of his last interviews — with the BBC's Andy Peebles — Lennon said this was the first intentional use of feedback on a music record. In The Beatles Anthology series, George Harrison said that the feedback started accidentally when a guitar was placed on an amplifier but that Lennon had worked out how to achieve the effect live on stage. In The Complete Beatles Recording Sessions, Mark Lewisohn states that all the takes of the song included the feedback.

The Beatles continued to use feedback on later songs. "It's All Too Much", for instance, begins with sustained guitar feedback.

=== Close miking of acoustic instruments ===
During the recording of "Eleanor Rigby" on 28 April 1966, McCartney said he wanted to avoid "Mancini" strings. To fulfil this brief, Geoff Emerick close-miked the strings—the microphones were almost touching the strings. George Martin had to instruct the players not to back away from the microphones.

Microphones began to be placed closer to the instruments in order to produce a fuller sound. Ringo's drums had a large sweater stuffed in the bass drum to deaden the sound while the bass drum microphone was positioned very close, which resulted in the drum being more prominent in the mix. "Eleanor Rigby" features just McCartney and a double string quartet that has the instruments miked so close to the string that "the musicians were in horror". In "Got to Get You into My Life", the brass were miked in the bells of their instruments then put through a Fairchild limiter.

According to Emerick, in 1966, this was considered a radically new way of recording strings; nowadays it is common practice.

=== Direct input ===
Direct input (DI) was first used by the Beatles on 1 February 1967 to record McCartney's bass on "Sgt. Pepper's Lonely Hearts Club Band". With direct input the guitar pick-up is connected to the recording console via an impedance-matching DI box. Ken Townsend claimed this as the first use anywhere in the world, although Joe Meek, an independent producer from London, is known to have done it earlier (early 1960s) and in America, Motown's engineers had been using Direct Input since the early 1960s for guitars and bass guitars, primarily due to restrictions of space in their small 'Snakepit' recording studio.

=== Tape manipulation ===
==== Artificial double tracking ====
Artificial double tracking (ADT) was invented by Ken Townsend in 1966, during the recording of Revolver. With the advent of four-track recordings, it became possible to double track vocals whereby the performer sings along with their own previously recorded vocal. Phil McDonald, a member of the studio staff, recalled that Lennon did not really like singing a song twice - it was obviously important to sing exactly the same words with the same phrasing—and after a particularly trying evening of double tracking vocals, Townsend "had an idea" while driving home one evening hearing the sound of the car in front. ADT works by taking the original recording of a vocal part and duplicating it onto a second tape machine which has a variable speed control. The manipulation of the speed of the second machine during playback introduces a delay between the original vocal and the second recording of it, giving the effect of double tracking without having to sing the part twice.

The effect had been created "accidentally" earlier, when recording "Yesterday": loudspeakers were used to cue the string quartet and some of McCartney's voice was recorded onto the string track, which can be heard on the final recording.

It has been claimed that George Martin's pseudoscientific explanation of ADT ("We take the original image and we split it through a double-bifurcated sploshing flange") given to Lennon originated the phrase flanging in recording, as Lennon would refer to ADT as "Ken's flanger", although other sources claim the term originated from pressing a finger on the tape recorder's tape supply reel (the flange) to make small adjustments to the phase of the copy relative to the original.

ADT greatly influenced recording—virtually all the tracks on Revolver and Sgt. Pepper's Lonely Hearts Club Band had the treatment and it is still widely used for instruments and voices. Nowadays, the effect is more often known as automatic double tracking.

ADT can be heard on the lead guitar on "Here, There and Everywhere" and the vocals on "Eleanor Rigby" for example. The technique was used later by bands like the Grateful Dead and Iron Butterfly, amongst others.

==== Sampling ====
The Beatles first used samples of other music on "Yellow Submarine", the samples being added on 1 June 1966. The brass band solo was constructed from a Sousa march by George Martin and Geoff Emerick, the original solo was in the same key and was transferred to tape, cut into small segments and re-arranged to form a brief solo which was added to the song. A similar technique was used for "Being for the Benefit of Mr. Kite" on 20 February 1967. To try to create the atmosphere of a circus, Martin first proposed the use of a calliope (a steam-driven organ). Such was the power of the Beatles within EMI that phone calls were made to see if a calliope could be hired and brought into the studio. However, only automatic calliopes, controlled by punched cards, were available, so other techniques had to be used. Martin came up with taking taped samples from several steam organ pieces, cutting them into short lengths, "throwing them in the air" and splicing them together. It took two trials; in the first attempt, the pieces coincidentally came back in more or less original order.

More obvious, and therefore more influential samples were used on "I Am the Walrus"—a live BBC Third Programme broadcast of King Lear was mixed into the track on 29 September 1967. McCartney has also described a lost opportunity of live sampling: the EMI studio was set up in such a way that the echo track from the echo chamber could be picked up in any of the control rooms. Paul Jones was recording in a studio whilst "I Am the Walrus" was being mixed and the Beatles were tempted to "nick" (steal) some of Jones's singing to put into the mix.

==== Synchronising tape machines ====
One way of increasing the number of tracks available for recording is to synchronise tape machines together. Since the early 1970s SMPTE timecode has been used to synchronise tape machines. Modern SMPTE timecode controlled recorders provide a mechanism so that the second machine will automatically position the tape correctly and start and stop simultaneously with the master machine. However, in 1967, SMPTE timecode was not available and other techniques had to be used.

On 10 February 1967 during the recording of "A Day in the Life", Ken Townsend synchronised two machines so that extra tracks were available for recording the orchestra. Speaking in an interview with Australia's ABC, Geoff Emerick described the technique; EMI tape machines' speed could be controlled using an external speed controller which adjusted the frequency of the mains supply to the motor. By using the same controller to control two machines, they were synchronised. Townsend thereby effectively used pilottone, a technique that was common in 16mm news gathering whereby a 50/60 Hz tone was sent from the movie camera to a tape recorder during filming in order to achieve lip-synch sound recording. With the simple tone used for "A Day in the Life", the start position was marked with a wax pencil on the two machines and the tape operator had to align the tapes by eye and attempt to press play and record simultaneously for each take.

Although the technique was reasonably successful, Townsend recalled that when they tried to use the tape on a different machine, the synchronisation was sometimes lost. George Martin claimed this as the first time tape machines had been synchronised, although SMPTE synchronisation for video/audio synchronisation was developed around 1967.

==== Backwards tapes ====
As the Beatles pioneered the use of musique concrète in pop music (i.e. the sped-up tape loops in "Tomorrow Never Knows"), backward recordings came as a natural exponent of this experimentation. "Rain", the first rock song featuring a backwards vocal (Lennon singing the first verse of the song), came about when Lennon (claiming the influence of marijuana) accidentally loaded a reel-to-reel tape of the song on his machine backwards and essentially liked what he heard so much he quickly had the reversed overdubbed. A quick follow-up was the reversed guitar on "I'm Only Sleeping", which features a dual guitar solo by George Harrison played backwards. Harrison worked out a guitar part, learned to play the part in reverse, and recorded it backwards. Likewise, a backing track of reversed drums and cymbals made its way into the verses of "Strawberry Fields Forever". The Beatles' well-known use of reversed tapes led to rumours of backwards messages, including many that fueled the Paul is Dead urban myth. However, only "Rain" and "Free as a Bird" include intentional reversed vocals in Beatles songs.

The stereo version of George Harrison's "Blue Jay Way" (1967, Magical Mystery Tour) also includes backwards vocals, which is actually a backwards copy of the entire mix, including all instruments, which is faded up at the end of each phrase.

== See also ==
- Outline of the Beatles
- The Beatles timeline

== Bibliography ==
- The Beatles (2000). The Beatles Anthology. Chronicle Books. ISBN 0-811-82684-8.
- Davies, Hunter (1996). The Beatles (2nd rev. ed.). W. W. Norton. ISBN 0-393-31571-1.
- Emerick, Geoff (2006). Here, There and Everywhere: My Life Recording the Music of The Beatles. Gotham Books. ISBN 978-1-59240-269-4.
- Everett, Walter (2009). The Foundations of Rock: From "Blue Suede Shoes" to "Suite: Judy Blue Eyes. US: Oxford University Press. ISBN 978-0-19-531024-5.
- Hertsgaard, Mark (1995). A Day in The Life (First Hardback ed.). Macmillan. ISBN 978-0-385-31517-3.
- Holmes, Thomas (2002). Electronic and Experimental Music: Pioneers in Technology and Composition. Psychology Press. ISBN 978-0-415936446.
- Lewisohn, Mark (1988). The Complete Beatles Recording Sessions (First Hardback ed.). EMI. ISBN 978-0-600-61207-0.
- Morin, Cari (1998). The Evolution of Beatles' Recording Technology. Northwestern University. Archived from the original on 2 July 2006.
- Repsch, John (1989). The Legendary Joe Meek - The Telstar Man. Cherry Red Books. ISBN 1-901447-20-0.
- Ryan, Kevin; Kehew, Brian (2006). Recording the Beatles (1st ed.). Curvebender. ISBN 0-9785200-0-9.
