= Ken Townsend =

English recording engineer

- Born: 1932 or 1933 (age 92–93)
- Occupation: sound engineer

Ken Townsend is an English sound engineer who played an important role at Abbey Road Studios. He worked on several Beatles albums, such as Rubber Soul, Revolver and Sgt. Pepper's Lonely Hearts Club Band. In 1966 he invented artificial double tracking (ADT). He spent his whole working career at EMI and retired as the Chairman of the Studio Group in 1995.

== Career ==
Following a four-year apprenticeship at EMI's Hayes facility, Townsend was hired in 1954 as a recording engineer at EMI Studios. Townsend worked with the Beatles throughout their entire career at EMI. He was present on 6 June 1962 for the band's first session at the studio and in August 1969 as they completed work on their album Abbey Road. Later described by producer George Martin as one of the "backroom boy[s]", Townsend rarely worked directly with the band but instead as a maintenance engineer, responsible for helping develop many of the studio inventions first used by the band. After being promoted to the studio's general manager in 1974, he began a process of rebranding the studio to capitalise on its connection with the Beatles. In 1976, he oversaw its official name-change from EMI to Abbey Road Studios.

=== ADT ===
I got the idea of double tracking the vocals in order to cut down on the amount of time we spent double-tracking. Using various pieces of equipment I was able to create a system whereby we could record two sets of voices at once and then space the second voice at any required time interval either side of the original.

– Townsend on developing ADT, 1982

During the recording of "Tomorrow Never Knows", John Lennon complained that he had always hated doing a second take to double the sound of his vocals, so Townsend, the studio technical manager, created the world's first automatic double tracking system by taking the signal from the playback and recording heads and delaying them slightly, thereby creating two sound images from the original signal. By altering the speed and frequencies he could also create other different types of effects, which the Beatles used throughout the recording of Revolver .
