= Automatic double tracking =

Audio recording technique

Automatic double-tracking or artificial double-tracking (ADT) is an analogue recording technique designed to enhance the sound of voices or instruments during the mixing process. It uses tape delay to create a delayed copy of an audio signal which is then played back at slightly varying speed controlled by an oscillator and combined with the original. The effect is intended to simulate the sound of the natural doubling of voices or instruments achieved by double tracking. The technique was developed in 1966 by engineers at Abbey Road Studios in London at the request of the Beatles.

== Background ==
As early as the 1950s, it was discovered that double-tracking the lead vocal in a song gave it a richer, more appealing sound, especially for singers with weak or light voices. Use of this technique became possible with the advent of magnetic tape for use in sound recording. Originally, a pair of single-track tape recorders were used to produce the effect; later, multitrack tape machines were used. Early pioneers of this technique were Les Paul and Buddy Holly.

Before the development of ADT, it was necessary to record and mix multiple takes of the vocal track. Because it is nearly impossible for a performer to sing or play the same part in exactly the same way twice, a recording and blending of two different performances of the same part will create a fuller, "chorused" effect with double tracking. But if one simply plays back two copies of the same performance in perfect sync, the two sound images become one and no double-tracking effect is produced.

== Invention ==
ADT was invented specially for the Beatles during the spring of 1966 by Ken Townsend, a recording engineer employed at EMI's Abbey Road Studios, mainly at the request of John Lennon, who despised the tedium of double tracking during sessions and regularly expressed a desire for a technical alternative.

Townsend came up with a system using tape delay, after similar principles already in place for echoes applied via tape during a song mixdown. Townsend's system added a second tape recorder to the regular setup. When mixing a song, its vocal track was routed from the recording head of the multitrack tape, located before the playback head, and fed to the record head of the second tape recorder. An oscillator was used to vary the speed of the second machine, providing variation in delay and pitch depending on the change in the second machine speed. This signal was then routed from the playback head of the second machine to a separate channel on the mixer. This allowed the vocal delayed by a few milliseconds to be combined with the normal vocal, creating the double-tracked effect.

== Use by the Beatles ==
The Beatles were ecstatic over Townsend's technique and used it throughout their 1966 album Revolver and on many of their subsequent recordings. It has been incorrectly claimed that the first use of ADT was on the first half of Lennon's vocal track on "Tomorrow Never Knows", but in actuality, this vocal track features manual double tracking. Most of the double-tracked vocals heard on the rest of the album were created using ADT, while the group also used the technique on a number of the instrumental parts to colour the sounds – there is factually more use of ADT on the mono version of the album than on the more widely known stereo version, with the lead guitar on "Taxman" and the backwards guitar on "I'm Only Sleeping" treated with the effect.

When used on a stereo mix, ADT could be used to create the impression of two different vocal parts on either side of the stereo picture. This technique was used on the stereo mixes of "I'm Only Sleeping", "Love You To", "And Your Bird Can Sing", and "Doctor Robert" (on "Here, There and Everywhere", the similar effect heard is actually two different vocals manually double-tracked and panned; on "Eleanor Rigby", the effect is obtained by a combination of manual double-tracking and ADT). This technique could also be applied to instrumental parts as well: on "Love You To", the same use of ADT was applied to the acoustic guitar track, giving the impression of multiple guitars panned left and right.

== Flanging ==
Lennon dubbed the technique "flanging" after producer George Martin jokingly told him it was produced using a "double-bifurcated sploshing flange". Only years later did Martin learn that another technique, also called flanging, was already in use. The term referred to an engineer alternately pressing and releasing his finger against the flange (rim) of the supply reel on one of two synchronized tape machines as the same audio signal was combined and transferred to a third machine, slightly slowing the machine then allowing it to come back up to speed and in sync with the other, applying a "swooshing" comb filtering effect to the combined audio signal. Alternatively, the engineer could press the flange of one supply reel, then the other, to achieve a fuller effect.

An additional explanation for the pedigree of flanging has it named after Fred Flange, a pseudonym given to Matt Monro by Peter Sellers, who used a Monro recording to open his 1959 Sinatra parody album Songs for Swingin' Sellers. The album was produced by Martin, and presumably the connection with flanging comes from Monro's mimicking (double-tracking) Sinatra. Engineers at Abbey Road realised that the technique they had developed needed a proper technical name and eventually christened it ADT, short for "Artificial Double Tracking", although elsewhere the term "Automatic Double Tracking" became more common.

== ADT versus manual double tracking ==
Townsend's process succeeded in simulating manual double tracking quite effectively; however, attentive listeners can often tell the difference between ADT and "real" double tracking, with the former having a synthetic quality to it and having none of the audible differences between the vocal tracks frequently present in the latter. Over the years, many artists, including the Beatles, continued to use both manual double tracking, ADT, or a combination of both in different circumstances depending on the effects they wished to achieve, with each technique thought to have certain unique qualities of its own.

== Use in music ==
The Beatles used ADT widely in conjunction with manual double-tracking on all their subsequent albums, with the exception of Let It Be, which was initially intended to be an "honest" album utilising no technical artifice (ADT can still be heard on the finished album, however, because Phil Spector treated a Hammond organ part with it on his mix of the title track). Some notable examples of ADT used by the Beatles in the years following Revolver include "Within You Without You" (on which ADT was purportedly used on almost every vocal and instrumental part on the track), "I Am the Walrus" (which uses ADT in conjunction with equalisation to help simulate a "fake stereo" effect on the second half of the stereo mix, which was sourced from the mono mix, by splitting the entire mix between the channels), and the unusually wide ADT used on the lead vocal tracks on "Being for the Benefit of Mr. Kite" and "Blue Jay Way". On "While My Guitar Gently Weeps", Eric Clapton used ADT to make his guitar sound 'less bluesy', according to Ian MacDonald in Revolution in the Head.

=== Other users of ADT ===
Townsend's technique, and minor variations on it, quickly caught on with other artists and record producers. Former Beatles engineer Norman Smith used ADT extensively on Pink Floyd's debut album The Piper at the Gates of Dawn, recorded at Abbey Road in 1967. As well as using it for more conventional simulated double tracking, Smith made much use of the technique to split Syd Barrett's vocals between the stereo channels. In some cases, Smith (or possibly Barrett himself) used such extraordinarily wide ADT in this way as to give the slightly disorientating impression of not so much double tracking but two quite separate voices on either channel wildly out of time with each other – the best example of this is perhaps on "Bike". Similar effects were later used on some of Barrett's solo works, perhaps indicating his fondness for this unusual use of ADT. Pink Floyd themselves continued to use ADT on most, if not all, of their subsequent albums up until the 1980s, with one notable use being on "Alan's Psychedelic Breakfast", where a part of the drum track is treated with ADT. In the US, Simon and Garfunkel began to use ADT on stereo mixes of their songs to split vocal tracks between the channels, examples of which include "Mrs. Robinson" and "Cecilia".

Gary Kellgren, Jimi Hendrix's engineer, used ADT extensively on all of Hendrix's albums. He frequently split vocal, guitar, and even drum parts between the stereo channels.

As the music industry's hunger for technological advances increased, new devices were created to make it easier and faster to achieve the same results. Thus, the industry saw analogue delay devices created and brought to market that no longer needed tape machines to achieve the ADT effect. They used electronic circuits instead. Much later on, these analogue delays were augmented by digital delay units. There has since been a thriving market among guitarists and other musicians for guitar pedals, or effects units, reproducing chorus and delay that owe their development to ADT. Nowadays, the ADT and similar effects are available as computer software plugins.

=== Psychedelic music ===
With the rise of psychedelic music, many artists used variations on Townsend's technique to create the "flanging" effect mentioned above, adding a slightly disorienting "swooshing" quality to instruments and voices (although in practice this effect is actually more similar to what today is called "phasing" rather than "flanging"). The Beatles themselves used this effect on "Lucy in the Sky with Diamonds" and more prominently on "Blue Jay Way". A notable example of this technique is "Itchycoo Park" by the Small Faces, where the effect is prominent almost throughout the entire track, particularly on the vocals, drums and cymbals during the chorus. Hendrix also used this technique extensively. An example of an ADT variation being used to create an effect more similar to what is considered "flanging" today (rather than phasing) is on the Beatles' White Album tracks "Cry Baby Cry" (acoustic guitar) and "While My Guitar Gently Weeps" (lead guitar).

=== Doubling echo ===
A similar technique to ADT is doubling echo, which uses short delays to mimic the double-tracking effect. Many effects units were developed to produce similar sounds, such as chorus, flangers, and phasers, all of which use an oscillating delay (or, in the phaser, a variable phase network). Other notable uses of ADT doubling echo are apparent on select material by Elton John. Some examples of this can be heard on Nigel Olsson's drums, especially the tom toms, on the songs "Don't Let The Sun Go Down On Me" from the Caribou album, as well as "Better Off Dead" and "Someone Saved My Life Tonight" on Captain Fantastic and the Brown Dirt Cowboy.

== Post-tape technology ==
With the advent of studio rack effects and guitar effects pedals, tape-based delay methods have not been much used, though many of these tape-based techniques are frequently emulated using comparable analog circuit or digital techniques, or in some cases plugins which are used to extend the capabilities of a digital audio workstation. Some musicians and engineers may casually use the term ADT to refer to any form of simulated double tracking, including digital delay used in this manner. One of the very few examples of the original ADT technique being used in recent times is on the Beatles' Anthology albums from the mid-1990s, on which George Martin and Geoff Emerick decided to revive the analogue technique rather than simply use the modern digital alternatives to achieve a more authentic sound, feeling that ADT produced a warmer, less synthetic sound than digital delay and the latter would be inappropriate for use on recordings made on analogue equipment in the 1960s.

== See also ==
- Recording practices of the Beatles
