= EMI REDD =

British mixing console

The EMI REDD .17, .37 and .51 were vacuum-tube-based mixing consoles designed by EMI for their Abbey Road Studios. They were used to mix several influential albums, including most of the Beatles' albums and the first two Pink Floyd albums.

== History ==
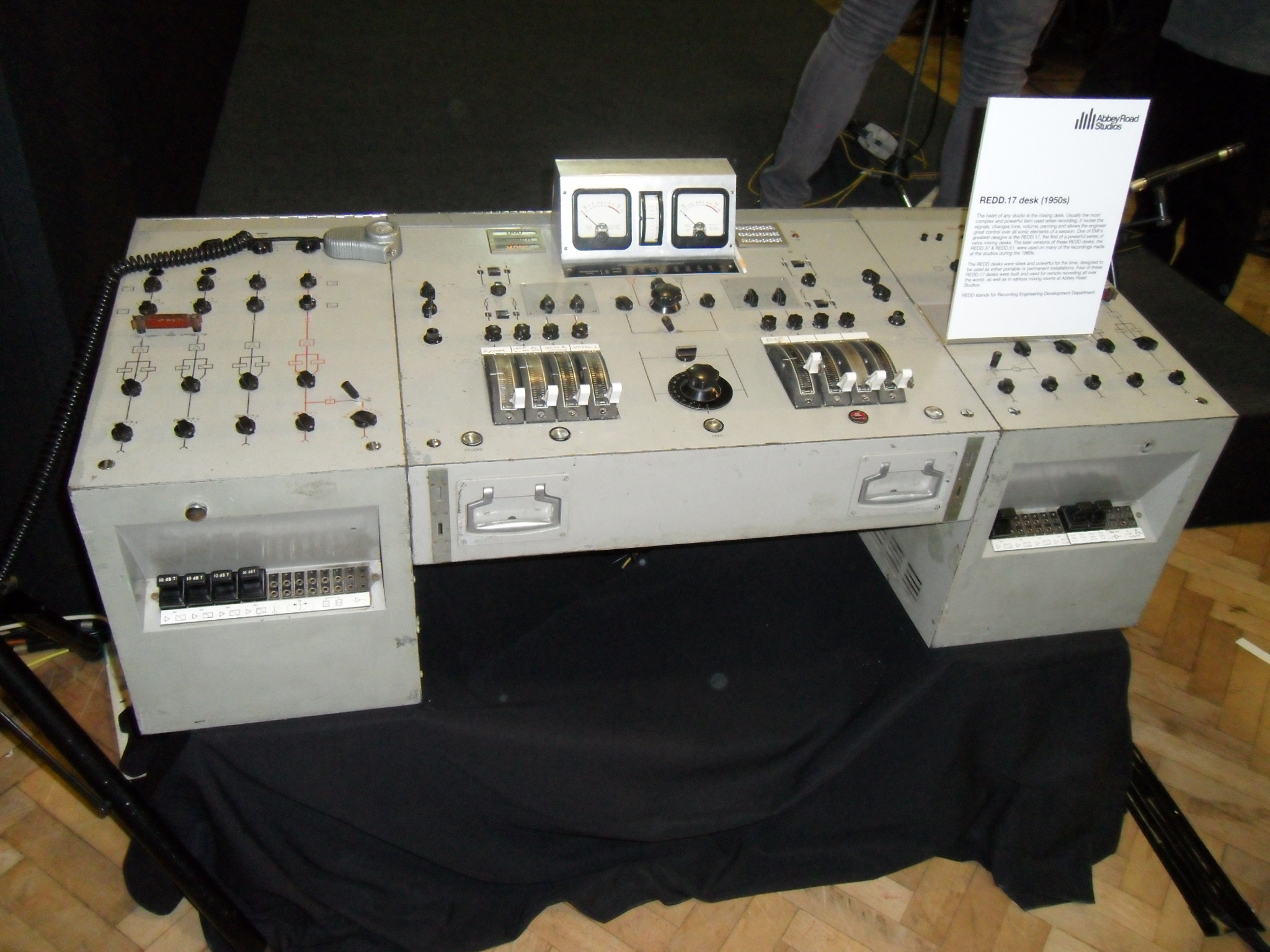
An EMI REDD.17 on display

Abbey Road Studios’ technical engineer Lenn Page established the Record Engineering Development Department (REDD) in 1955 to develop equipment that would facilitate stereo recordings. At the time, mass-produced recording studio equipment was not available, and EMI/Abbey Road custom-built equipment in-house.

The first REDD console, the REDD.17, was developed in 1958 by Peter Burkotwitz at EMI Electrola in West Germany, and was Abbey Road Studios' first dedicated stereo mixing system. Employing a modular design still used in large-format consoles today, the REDD.17 was one of the first modern-style mixing consoles.

The REDD.37 and its successor, the REDD.51, had a similar design with added outputs needed to accommodate Abbey Road Studios' new four-track tape machines. Both models featured 14 Painton quadrant faders to control the level of eight microphone input channels, two auxiliary channels, and four master outputs. The REDD.51 featured new amps that offered more headroom and lower distortion; Abbey Road installed the first REDD.51 in Studio 2 in 1964. Only three REDD.37s and four REDD.51 consoles were ever built.

Abbey Road Studios was forced to retire their 4-track REDD consoles in November 1968, replacing them with the EMI TG12345, which featured the eight outputs necessary for the studios' new 3M 8-track recorder.

== Legacy ==
Most of the Beatles' albums, including Sgt. Pepper's Lonely Hearts Club Band were recorded with the REDD consoles at Abbey Road Studios. Pink Floyd's 1967 debut album, The Piper at the Gates of Dawn and its follow-up, A Saucerful of Secrets, were also recorded on the studios' REDD consoles.

One REDD.17 console was in use at Toe Rag Studios in London before being installed at Frying Pan Studios inside the MONA Museum in Hobart, Tasmania (Australia), where it is fully restored and working. One REDD.37 console was purchased by Lenny Kravitz in 1992, and used at his own Gregory Town Sound studio in The Bahamas. The only remaining REDD.51 in existence, originally employed in the EMI studio in Milan, Italy, is located at British Grove Studios in London.

== Software emulations ==
In 2013, Waves Audio released a plug-in that emulates the REDD.17, REDD.37 and REDD.51 mixing consoles.

Chandler Limited established a partnership with Abbey Road Studios to develop and produce several plug-in emulations of the studios' classic recording gear, including a plug-in that emulates the REDD.47 microphone amplifier circuit from the REDD.51 mixing console.
