= Lady Lazarus (Mad Men) =

- Mad Men episode
- Episode no.: Season 5 Episode 8
- Directed by: Phil Abraham
- Written by: Matthew Weiner
- Original air date: May 6, 2012
- Running time: 48 minutes

Guest appearances
- Alexis Bledel as Beth Dawes; Ben Feldman as Michael Ginsberg; Teyonah Parris as Dawn Chambers; Jeff Clarke as Howard Dawes; Dennis Haskins as Phil Beachum; Jordan Feldman as Rick Swanson; Doug Tompos as Pat Wallace

Episode chronology
← Previous "At the Codfish Ball"	Next → "Dark Shadows"
- Mad Men season 5

"Lady Lazarus" is the eighth episode of the fifth season of the American television drama series Mad Men and the 60th episode of the series overall. It was written by Matthew Weiner and directed by Phil Abraham. It originally aired on the AMC channel in the United States on May 6, 2012.

The episode is set in October 1966. Megan has second thoughts on her career path after the success with Heinz but finds it difficult to tell Don. Peggy, unwittingly caught between the two when Megan's lie comes to light, finally expresses her frustrations to both Megan and Don. Pete finds that his increasing success at the firm does not fill the emptiness of his life. After a sexual encounter one evening with a neighbor, he becomes obsessed with wanting to repeat the experience. Don returns to creative work full throttle, only to find the cultural changes of the 1960s have left him behind.

"Lady Lazarus" was watched by 2.29 million viewers during its initial broadcast, and drew in 0.7 million viewers in the coveted 18–49 demographic. It received considerable acclaim from the television critical community. The episode is named after a poem by Sylvia Plath. The episode is notable for its use of the Beatles master recording of "Tomorrow Never Knows" from the album Revolver. Creator Matthew Weiner paid for permission and engaged in a creative collaboration in order to use the song.

== Plot ==
Pete discusses life insurance with Howard, his commuter friend, who reveals that he has a new, attractive mistress and an apartment in the city. In the train station parking lot one evening, Howard's wife, Beth (Alexis Bledel), asks Pete if he knows her husband and tells Pete she has locked her keys in her car. Pete drives her home, during which time Beth discusses her dire relationship with Howard. He comforts her, and she kisses him, leading them to have sex on the floor of her home. After the incident, Beth tells Pete to forget it happened, which doesn't sit well with him. Pete continues to yearn for Beth afterwards, calling her and even orchestrating a situation in which Howard invites him to dinner with Beth at their home. Before Pete creates an excuse to leave, he tells Beth to meet him at the Hotel Pennsylvania. Pete checks into the hotel. When Beth doesn't arrive, Pete smashes a champagne glass against the wall.

Megan wants to get back into acting and begins to resent her job in advertising. After Peggy catches her in a lie meant to cover up her going to an audition, Megan confesses as much to Peggy, who scolds her for taking a high-value job in the agency that others would "kill to have". Late one night, Megan wakes Don up to tell him of her desire to start acting again, and with Don's apparent blessing, she quits her job at the agency the next morning. Don sees her off to the elevator as she leaves the office. Moments after Megan leaves, Don calls up another elevator. After the elevator doors open, Don looks down to find no elevator, just a bare elevator shaft. He peers down into the empty abyss and then steps backward.

Don complains to Megan about not knowing what is going on in youth and popular culture, leading Megan to bring him a copy of the Beatles album Revolver. She points to a song for him to start with. As Megan leaves for acting class, Don plays the song, "Tomorrow Never Knows", and sits with a glass of whiskey. He listens to some of it, but then picks up the needle, turns the record off, and walks back to his bedroom in silence. The song immediately resumes during the end credits.

== Production ==
The episode was written by series creator Matthew Weiner and directed by Phil Abraham. Matthew Weiner expanded on the significance of the empty elevator shaft:

"In my mind, that actually happened. The elevator wasn’t there, which we know happens all the time. I thought that was an amazing cinematic representation of his emotional state. He still had one thing left to say to her, and she’s gone, into the abyss. She’s gone off on her own. That’s all that that was supposed to be. Is someone going to fall down an elevator shaft? No. I will actually go on record as saying that."

== Reception ==
=== Ratings ===
"Lady Lazarus" was viewed by 2.29 million viewers on the night of its original airing. It drew 0.7 million viewers in the 18–49 demographic.

=== Critical reception ===
The episode received praise from television critics. The Hollywood Reporter's Tim Goodman stated:

"There might be better Mad Men episodes to come, but at this point I'd say 'Lady Lazarus' is the episode Matt Weiner should win an Emmy for writing. He's truly in command here and he's touching on so many longtime Mad Men truisms – including the main one, existentialism – that he makes it look effortless."

Emily VanderWerff of The A.V. Club gave the episode an A grade:

"'Lady Lazarus' feels big. It feels like a Rosetta Stone for the season, one that we don't have all of the pieces to read just yet, but an episode that will seem even more obviously great in retrospect once we do. At the same time, though, analyzing it feels ever more like taking hold of one thing and trying to make it stand in for the episode as a whole."

TIME magazine writer Nate Rawlings stated:

"If Megan's phone-booth conversation was the beginning of a new and exciting chapter in her life, Pete Campbell's off-the-record chat was certainly the low point in a year that has seen his life spiral out of control. Professionally, things could hardly be going better for Pete. Companies are lining up to work with him, and the new, mellow Roger is all too willing to pass off work and help from the sidelines. But personally, Pete is a disaster."

Alan Sepinwall of HitFix stated:

"Early in 'Lady Lazarus', Don complains to Megan that he has no idea what's happening in pop culture anymore. She reassures him that 'No one can keep up; it's always changing.' Culturally, it feels like we've seen more change in this season than the four previous, and that rate is only accelerating."
