= EMI TG12345 =

Mixing console from EMI Abbey Road Studios

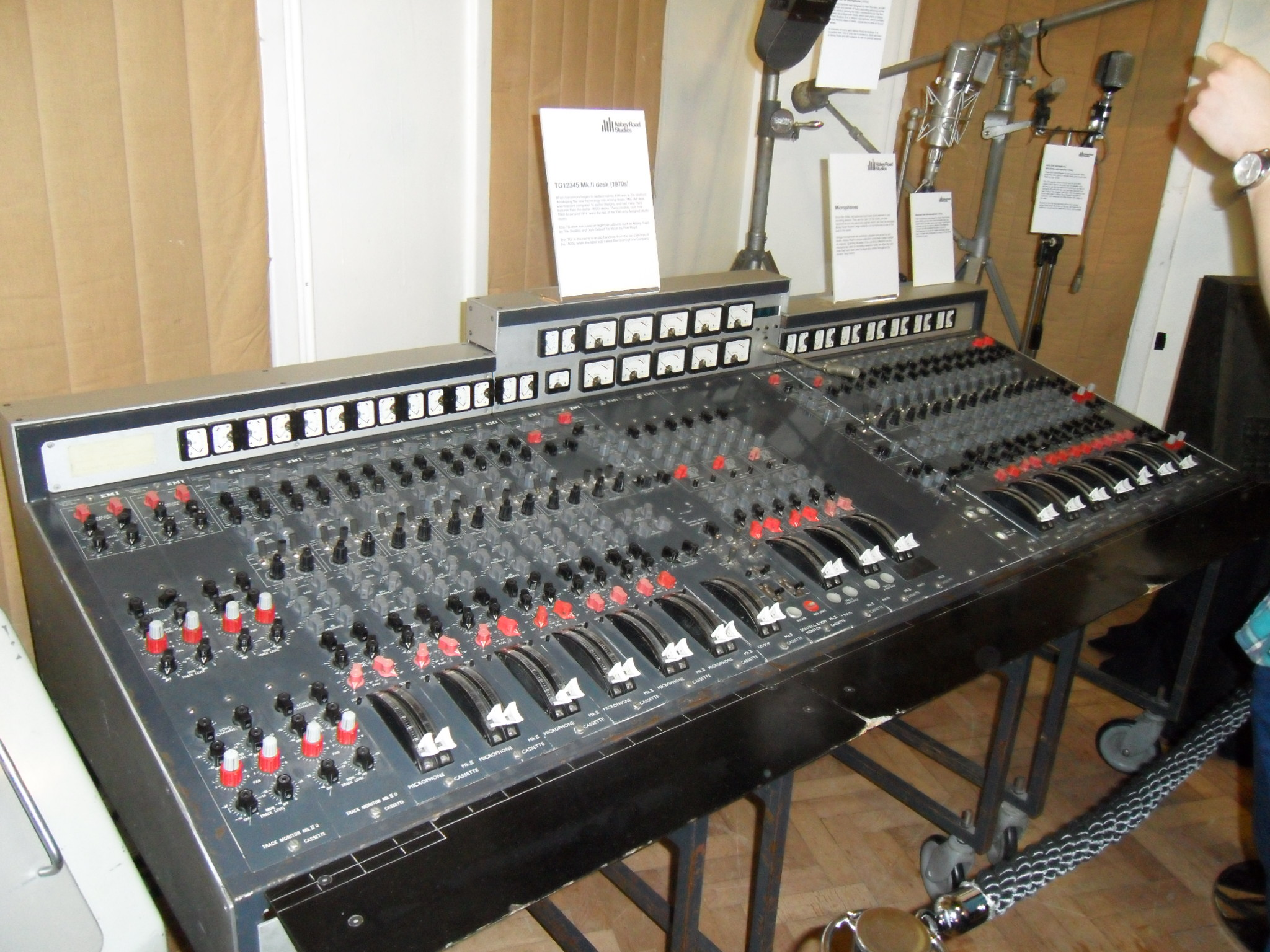
An EMI TG12345 Mk.II on display

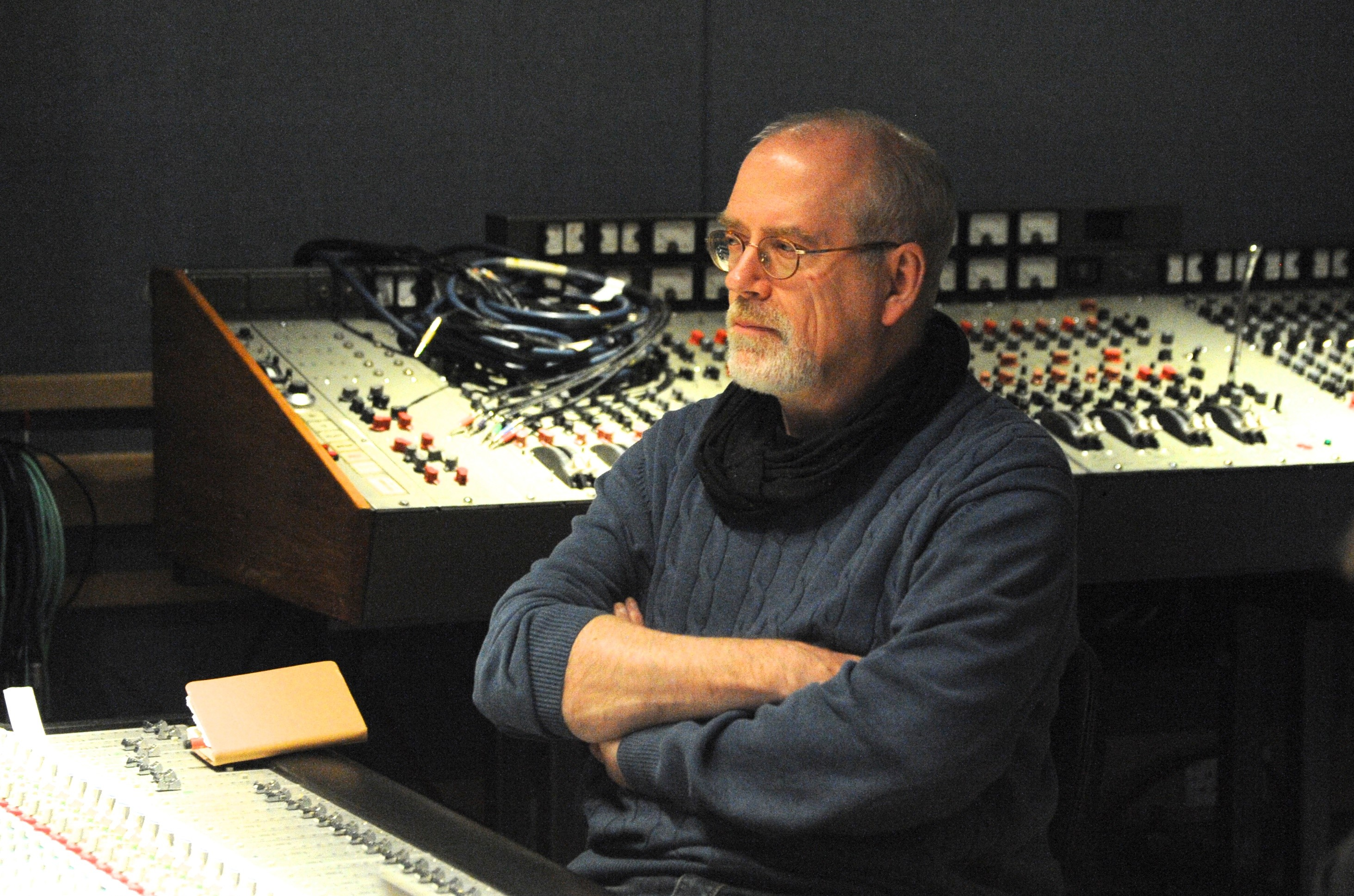
EMI TG12345 Mk.III on Abbey Road Studio 3, with Steve Lake

The EMI TG12345 is a mixing console designed by EMI for their Abbey Road Studios, which was used to mix several influential albums, including the Beatles' Abbey Road and Pink Floyd's The Dark Side of the Moon.

== Overview ==
The TG12345 was installed in Abbey Road Studio Two in late 1968, doubling the amount of tracks for multitrack recording from 4 to 8. The mixer had 24 microphone inputs and 8 tape outputs, a significant increase over the eight microphone inputs and four tape outputs of the REDD .51 mixing console that it replaced. This also enabled the studio to replace its four-track Studer J37 multitrack tape recorder with the eight-track 3M M23.

The TG12345 was Abbey Road Studios' first solid-state mixing console and, unlike its predecessors that were based on vacuum tubes, it featured a compressor as well as audio equalization built into each channel.

Abbey Road was recorded and mixed on that console. All members of the Beatles also recorded a solo album on it: John Lennon recorded Plastic Ono Band, Ringo Starr recorded Sentimental Journey, Paul McCartney recorded McCartney, and George Harrison recorded All Things Must Pass. Other influential albums were also recorded on the TG12345, such as Pink Floyd's The Dark Side of the Moon.

The console was decommissioned in 1972 and stored dismantled in the attic of Abbey Road Studio Three. Parts were scattered until the sound engineer Mike Hedges rescued it in 1988. Hedges worked during the following decades to reunite the original parts of the console. In 2018, Hedges contacted Malcolm Jackson of MJQ, a recording studio real-estate and used equipment broker, and Brian Gibson, former Abbey Road Studio technician, to restore the TG12345. The restoration took four years, and the console was placed for auction in October 2024. It was sold for £1,750,000.

== Hardware recreations and software emulations ==
In 2011, Chandler Limited released the Curve Bender, a rackmount recreation of the TG12345's EQ section. In 2014, Waves Audio released a plug-in that emulates two channels of the TG12345.
