= Brenell Engineering =

British audio equipment manufacturer

Brenell Engineering Ltd. was a British company in operation from 1947 to 1984 who manufactured audio electronics, in particular professional-quality reel-to-reel tape decks.

== History ==
The company was founded in 1947 by Robert Hahn and Peter Glazer, as a small precision engineering company based in Northington Street, Clerkenwell. In 1953, the company produced its first tape recorder, a "do-it-yourself" unit marketed under the Soundesign name. Brenell became a leading manufacturer of tape decks, including multi-track studio machines.

After a series of financial setbacks, the company was formally dissolved in January 1984.

All of the Beatles had Brenell tape recorders installed in their homes. These were used to make tape loops and other recordings that eventually found their way onto several Beatles recordings, such as "Tomorrow Never Knows".

Other users include Darren Allison, producer of the Divine Comedy and Spiritualized.
