= Tomorrow Never Knows =

1966 song by the Beatles

- Cover of the Northern Songs sheet music (licensed to Sonora Musikförlag)

Song by the Beatles

from the album Revolver
- Released: 5 August 1966
- Recorded: 6, 7 and 22 April 1966
- Studio: EMI, London
- Genre: Psychedelic rock; raga rock; acid rock; electronic; avant-pop
- Length: 3:00
- Label: Parlophone
- Songwriter: Lennon–McCartney
- Producer: George Martin

Music video
- "Tomorrow Never Knows" on YouTube

"Tomorrow Never Knows" is a song by the English rock band the Beatles, written primarily by John Lennon and credited to Lennon–McCartney. It was released in August 1966 as the final track on their album Revolver, although it was the first song recorded for the LP. The song marked a radical departure for the Beatles, as the band fully embraced the potential of the recording studio without consideration for reproducing the results in concert.

When writing the song, Lennon drew inspiration from his experiences with the hallucinogenic drug LSD and from the 1964 book The Psychedelic Experience: A Manual Based on the Tibetan Book of the Dead by Timothy Leary, Richard Alpert and Ralph Metzner. The Beatles' recording employed musical elements foreign to pop music, including musique concrète, avant-garde composition and electro-acoustic sound manipulation. It features an Indian-inspired modal backing of tambura and sitar drone and bass guitar, with minimal harmonic deviation from a single chord, underpinned by a constant but non-standard drum pattern; added to this, tape loops prepared by the band were overdubbed "live" onto the rhythm track. Part of Lennon's vocal was fed through a Leslie speaker cabinet, normally used for a Hammond organ. The song's reverse guitar parts and effects marked the first use of reversed sounds in a pop recording, although the Beatles' 1966 B-side "Rain", which they recorded soon afterwards using the same technique, was issued over two months before the release of Revolver.

"Tomorrow Never Knows" was an early and highly influential recording in the psychedelic and electronic music genres, particularly for its pioneering use of sampling, tape manipulation and other production techniques. It also introduced lyrical themes that espoused mind expansion, anti-materialism and Eastern spirituality into popular music. On release, the song was the source of confusion and ridicule by many fans and journalists; it has since received praise as an effective representation of a psychedelic experience. Pitchfork placed the track at number 19 on its list of "The 200 Greatest Songs of the 1960s", and Rolling Stone ranked it at number 18 on the magazine's list of the 100 greatest Beatles songs.

== Background and inspiration ==
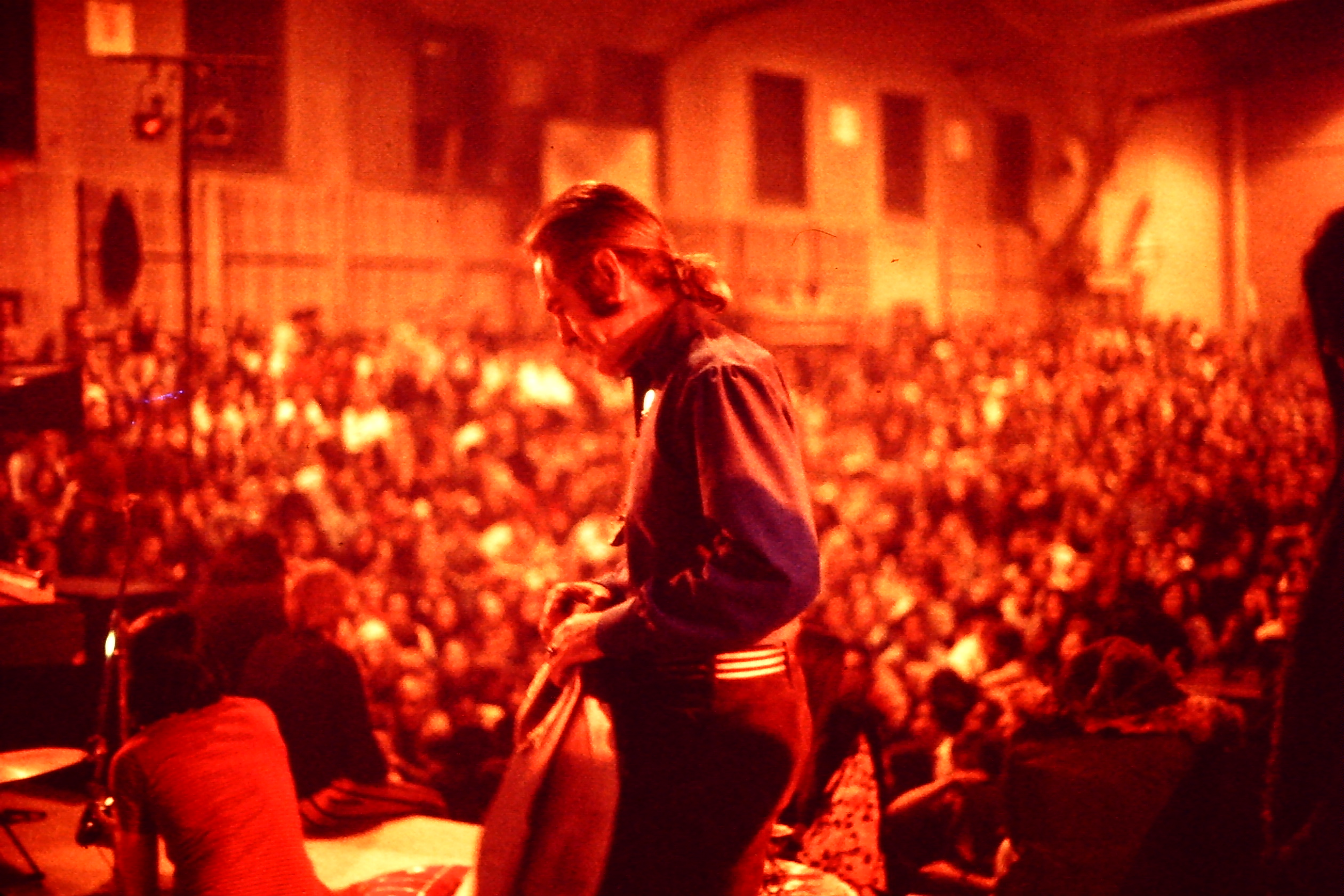
Timothy Leary before a crowd of university students during a lecture tour in 1969. In his lyrics to "Tomorrow Never Knows", Lennon drew from Leary's espousal of LSD as a means to transcend material concerns.

John Lennon wrote "Tomorrow Never Knows" in January 1966, with lyrics adapted from the 1964 book The Psychedelic Experience: A Manual Based on the Tibetan Book of the Dead by Timothy Leary, Richard Alpert and Ralph Metzner, which was in turn adapted from the Tibetan Book of the Dead. Although Beatles aide Peter Brown believed that Lennon's source for the lyrics was the Tibetan Book of the Dead itself, which, he said, Lennon had read while under the influence of LSD, George Harrison later stated that the idea for the lyrics came from Leary, Alpert and Metzner's book. Paul McCartney recalled that when he and Lennon visited the newly opened Indica bookshop, Lennon had been looking for a copy of The Portable Nietzsche and found a copy of The Psychedelic Experience that contained the lines: "Whenever in doubt, turn off your mind, relax, float downstream." In 1980, Lennon said he wrote the song during his "Tibetan Book of the Dead period."

Lennon said he bought the book, went home, took LSD, and followed the instructions exactly as stated in the text. The book held that the "ego death" experienced under the influence of LSD and other psychedelic drugs is essentially similar to the dying process and requires similar guidance. This is a state of being known by eastern mystics and masters as samādhi (a state of being totally aware of the present moment; a one-pointedness of mind). Harrison questioned whether Lennon fully understood the meaning of the song's lyrics:

Basically [the song] is saying what meditation is all about. The goal of meditation is to go beyond (that is, transcend) waking, sleeping and dreaming... I am not too sure if John actually fully understood what he was saying. He knew he was onto something when he saw those words and turned them into a song. But to have experienced what the lyrics in that song are actually about? I don't know if he fully understood it.

The title never appears in the song's lyrics. Lennon later revealed that, like "A Hard Day's Night", it was taken from one of Ringo Starr's malapropisms. In a television interview in early 1964, Starr had uttered the phrase "Tomorrow never knows" when laughing off an incident that took place at the British Embassy in Washington, DC, during which one of the guests had cut off a portion of his hair. The piece was originally titled "Mark I" and was referred to as such in the EMI studio documentation until the Beatles were remixing tracks for the Revolver album in June. "The Void" is cited as another working title, but according to Beatles historian Mark Lewisohn, this resulted from Neil Aspinall, the band's road manager and assistant, referring to it as such in a contemporary issue of The Beatles Book. Lennon said he settled on Starr's phrase "to sort of take the edge off the heavy philosophical lyrics". He also said "The Void" would have been a more suitable title, but he was concerned about its obvious drug connotations. According to Aspinall's account in The Beatles Monthly, the musical portion of the song was the result of all four Beatles working to ensure the music matched the power of Lennon's lyrics: "The basic tune was written during the first hours of the recording session."

== Musical structure ==
"Tomorrow Never Knows"
A 28-second sample from the first verse of "Tomorrow Never Knows". With a length of three minutes, its structure is influenced from Indian music.

McCartney recalled that even though the song's harmony was mainly restricted to the chord of C, George Martin, the Beatles' producer, accepted it as it was and said it was "rather interesting". (Note: Lennon first played the song to Brian Epstein, Martin and the other Beatles at Epstein's house at 24 Chapel Street, Belgravia, London.) The harmonic structure is derived from Indian music, a genre that Harrison had introduced to the Beatles' sound late in 1965 with his sitar part on "Norwegian Wood", and is based on a high volume C drone played on a tambura. The song's musical key is C Mixolydian. The chord over the drone is generally C major, but some changes to B♭ major result from vocal modulations, as well as orchestral and guitar tape loops.

At three minutes in length, "Tomorrow Never Knows" is a psychedelic rock, raga rock, acid rock, electronic, and avant-pop song. According to author Peter Lavezzoli, the composition is the first pop song to eschew formal chord changes altogether. (Note: Limited chord changes, typical of Indian classical music, were a characteristic of several of the songs the Beatles recorded early in the sessions for Revolver. Harrison's "Love You To" similarly features an implied ♭VII chord as its only departure from the I chord (of C major).) Despite this limitation, musicologist Dominic Pedler sees the Beatles' harmonic ingenuity displayed in the upper harmonies – "Turn off your mind", for example, is a run of unvarying E melody notes, before "relax" involves an E–G melody-note shift and "float downstream" an E–C–G descent. "It is not dying" involves a run of three G melody notes that rise on "dying" to a B♭, at the start of the verse's fifth bar, creating a ♭VII/I (B♭/C) "slash" polychord. (Note: This is a prominent device in Beatles songs such as "All My Loving", "A Hard Day's Night", "Help!", "Norwegian Wood", "Hey Jude", "Revolution", "Dear Prudence" and "Get Back".) Due to Lennon's adherence to Leary's text, "Tomorrow Never Knows" was also the first song by the Beatles to depart from any form of rhyming scheme.

== Recording ==
A cross-section showing the inner workings of a Leslie speaker cabinet

"Tomorrow Never Knows" was the first song attempted during the sessions for Revolver, which started at 8 pm on 6 April 1966, in Studio 3 at EMI Studios (subsequently Abbey Road Studios). Geoff Emerick, who was promoted to the role of the Beatles' recording engineer for Revolver, recalled that the band "encouraged us to break the rules" and ensure that each instrument "should sound unlike itself". Lennon sought to capture the atmosphere of a Tibetan Buddhist ceremony; he told Martin that the song should sound like it was being chanted by a thousand Tibetan monks, with his vocal evoking the Dalai Lama singing from a mountaintop. The latter effect was achieved by using a Leslie speaker. When the concept was explained to Lennon, he inquired if the same effect could be achieved by hanging him upside down and spinning him around a microphone while he sang into it. Emerick made a connector to break into the electronic circuitry of the Leslie cabinet and then re-recorded the vocal as it came out of the revolving speaker.

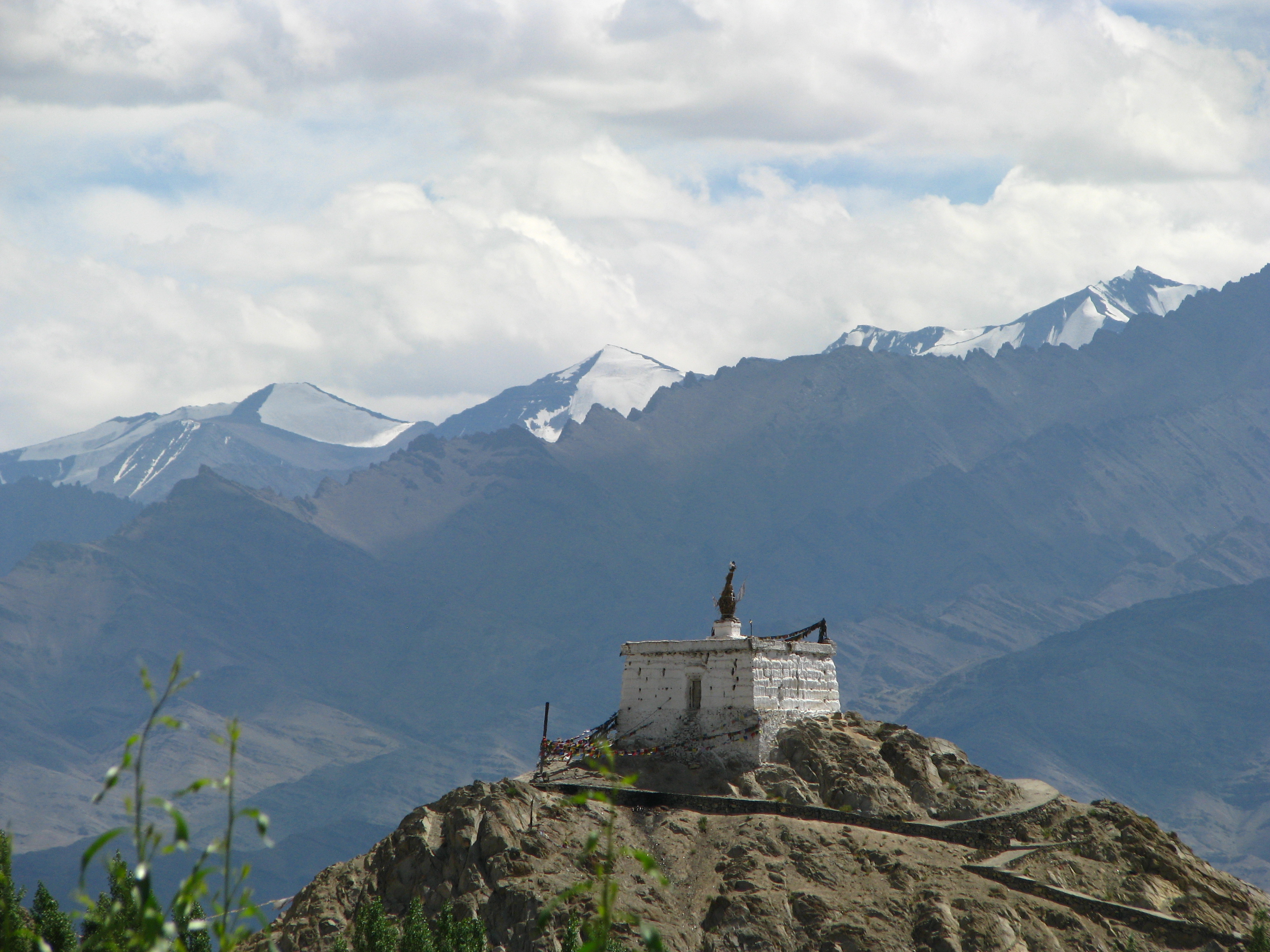
A small gompa (Tibetan Buddhist monastery) in Ladakh. Lennon sought to capture the mood of Tibetan monks chanting from a mountaintop.

Further to their approach when recording Rubber Soul late the previous year, the Beatles and Martin embraced the idea of the recording studio as an instrument on Revolver, particularly "Tomorrow Never Knows". As Lennon hated doing a second take to double his vocals, Ken Townsend, the studio's technical manager, developed an alternative form of double-tracking called artificial double tracking (ADT) system, taking the signal from the sync head of one tape machine and delaying it slightly through a second tape machine. The two tape machines used were not driven by mains electricity, but from a separate generator which put out a particular frequency, the same for both, thereby keeping them locked together. By altering the speed and frequencies, he could create various effects, which the Beatles used throughout the recording of Revolver. Lennon's vocal is double-tracked on the first three verses of the song: the effect of the Leslie cabinet can be heard after the (backwards) guitar solo.

The track includes the highly compressed drums that the Beatles favoured at the time, with reverse cymbals, reverse guitar, processed vocals, looped tape effects, and sitar and tambura drone. In the description of musicologist Russell Reising, the "meditative state" of a psychedelic experience is conveyed through the musical drone, enhancing the lyrical imagery, while the "buzz" of a drug-induced "high" is sonically reproduced in Harrison's tambura rhythm and Starr's heavily treated drum sound. Despite the implied chord changes in the verses and repeatedly at the end of the song, McCartney's bass maintains a constant ostinato in C. Reising writes of the drum part:

Starr's accompaniment throughout the piece consists of a kind of stumbling march, providing a bit of temporal disruption ... [The] first accent of each bar falls on the measure's first beat and the second stress occurs in the second half of the measure's third quarter, double sixteenth notes in stuttering pre-emption of the normal rhythmic emphasis on the second backbeat – hardly a classic rock and roll gesture.

The use of ¼-inch audio tape loops resulted primarily from McCartney's admiration for Stockhausen's Gesang der Jünglinge. By disabling the erase head of a tape recorder and then spooling a continuous loop of tape through the machine while recording, the tape would constantly overdub itself, creating a saturation effect, a technique also used in musique concrète. The tape could also be induced to go faster and slower. McCartney encouraged the other Beatles to use the same effects and create their own loops. After experimentation on their own, the various Beatles supplied a total of "30 or so" tape loops to Martin, who selected 16 for use on the song. Each loop was about six seconds long.

The overdubbing of the tape loops took place on 7 April. The loops were played on BTR3 tape machines located in various studios of the Abbey Road building and controlled by EMI technicians in Studio Three. Each machine was monitored by one technician, who had to hold a pencil within each loop to maintain tension. The four Beatles controlled the faders of the mixing console while Martin varied the stereo panning and Emerick watched the meters. Eight of the tapes were used at one time, changed halfway through the song. The tapes were made (like most of the other loops) by superimposition and acceleration. According to Martin, the finished mix of the tape loops could not be repeated because of the complex and random way in which they were laid over the music. Harrison similarly described the mix of loops as "spontaneous", given that each run-through might favour different sounds over another.

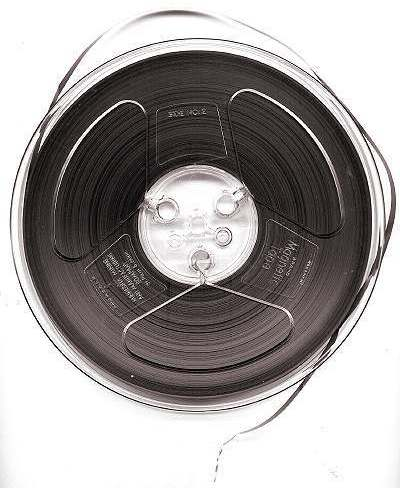
A 7-inch reel of 1/4-inch-wide (6.4 mm) audio recording tape, which was the type used to create the song's tape loops

Five tape loops are prominent in the finished version of the song. According to author Ian MacDonald, writing in the 1990s, these loops contain the following:

1. A recording of McCartney's laughter, sped up to resemble the sound of a seagull (enters at 0:07)
2. An orchestral chord of B♭ major (0:19)
3. A Mellotron on its flute setting (0:22)
4. A Mellotron strings sound, alternating between B♭ and C in 6/8 time (0:38)
5. A sitar playing a rising scalic phrase, recorded with heavy saturation and sped up (0:56).

Author Robert Rodriguez writes that the content of the five loops has continued to invite debate among commentators, however, and that the manipulation applied to each of the recordings has made them impossible to decipher with authority. Based on the most widely held views, he says that, aside from McCartney's laughter and the B♭ major chord, the sounds were two loops of sitar passages, both reversed and sped up, and a loop of Mellotron string and brass voicings. In their 2006 book Recording the Beatles, Kevin Ryan and Brian Kehew list two loops of sitar recordings yet, rather than Mellotron, list a mandolin or acoustic guitar, treated with tape echo.

Rather than revert to standard practice by having a guitar solo in the middle of the song, the track includes what McCartney described as a "tape solo". This section nevertheless includes a lead guitar part played by Harrison and recorded with the tape running backwards, to complement the sounds. The final overdubs were recorded on 22 April. According to Lewisohn, who had access to EMI's studios logs and notes, these overdubs comprised Harrison's sitar and Lennon's Leslie-treated vocal part. (Note: According to author John Winn, however, Lewisohn is mistaken. Winn says the overdubs that day were: organ, tambourine and piano, all on one track of the multitrack tape; Lennon manually doubling his non-Leslie vocal over the first two verses; and lead guitar (possibly played by McCartney) recorded with the tape direction reversed. Steve Turner also identifies this session as the date when the "backwards" lead guitar was added, although he credits Harrison as the player, as does Mark Hertsgaard.) Lennon later told Beatles biographer Hunter Davies: "I should have tried to get near my original idea, the monks singing. I realise now that's what I wanted." The discarded take 1 was issued on the Anthology 2 compilation in 1996.

== Previews and influence on Revolver project ==
While highlighting "Love You To" as an example of the Beatles fully exploring Indian musical form during the Revolver sessions, music historian Simon Philo identifies "Tomorrow Never Knows" as the track that "made few if any concessions to formula, and so confirmed that the Beatles had unequivocally moved on. 'Tomorrow Never Knows' was barely a song, let alone a pop song." Musicologist William Echard describes it as an example of a raga rock song "rubb[ing] shoulders with the classical avant-garde". After completing the recording, McCartney was eager to gauge the reaction of the band's contemporaries. On 2 May, he played the song to Bob Dylan at the latter's hotel suite in London; as the track started, Dylan said dismissively: "Oh, I get it. You don't want to be cute anymore." According to Marianne Faithfull, who was also present, Dylan then walked out of the room. McCartney recalled that when the Beatles played the song to members of the Rolling Stones and the Who, they "visibly sat up and were interested", whereas Cilla Black "just laughed".

After experimenting with the techniques on "Tomorrow Never Knows", the Beatles used reversed sounds and tape-speed variation extensively throughout the Revolver sessions. On "Rain", which was issued as the B-side of their "Paperback Writer" single in May 1966, part of Lennon's vocal track was reprised backwards over the coda, while Harrison planned and recorded his lead guitar parts for "I'm Only Sleeping" with the tape direction reversed, in order to achieve a dislocated effect. (Note: The band experimented further with tape loops in their later projects. Examples include "Carnival of Light", an unreleased piece recorded during the Sgt. Pepper's Lonely Hearts Club Band sessions; the Sgt. Pepper track "Being for the Benefit of Mr. Kite!"; and "Revolution 9", released on The Beatles.)

Tony Hall, a music industry figure and journalist with a reputation for predicting trends, was also given a preview of the song, along with other tracks from early in the sessions. Writing in his column for Record Mirror in the issue dated 14 May, Hall especially highlighted "The Void" when describing the new songs as "the most revolutionary ever made by a pop group". (Note: Hall emphasised that the titles were not yet finalised, adding: "The boys talk about it as 'The Void'. But I very much doubt if it will end up as that.") Focusing on the otherworldly electronic effects, he wrote: "Sound-wise, it's like an hypnotically horrific journey through the dark never-ending jungle of someone's mind ... And the effect is of shapes and sounds and colours looming over and above one and zooming in and out of a monotonous drone." Hall added that the track was "as revolutionary as Ornette Coleman appeared to the jazz scene a decade ago", before concluding: "[The Beatles] are so far ahead. And I'm longing to hear your reaction when the album is eventually issued."

== Release ==
"Tomorrow Never Knows" was the most experimental and psychedelic track on Revolver, in both its structure and production ... [T]he lyrics were philosophical, existential, sometimes inscrutable reflections on the state of being: a heavy subject for popular music, whether in 1966 or any other year.

— Music critic Richie Unterberger

"Tomorrow Never Knows" was sequenced as the final track on Revolver, which EMI's Parlophone label issued on 5 August 1966. According to author Mark Hertsgaard, as the first song recorded during the Revolver sessions, its sequencing ensures that the track serves as "the summit to which the entire album ascends". In his design for the LP cover, Klaus Voormann drew inspiration from the song, recognising the need for artwork that would capture the Beatles' new direction and the avant-garde aspect of the recording. Voormann later said that he found "Tomorrow Never Knows" "frightening", adding that it was "so far away from the early Beatles stuff that even I myself thought, well, the normal kind of Beatles fan won't want to buy this record. But they did." In an interview in October 1966, Harrison described the song as "easily the most amazing new thing we've ever come up with", but acknowledged that it might represent "a terrible mess of a sound" to listeners who approached the track without "open ears". He added: "It's like the Indian stuff. You mustn't listen to Eastern music with a Western ear."

In advance of the release, EMI had issued the songs to radio stations throughout July, in increments, to prepare the Beatles' audience for the new music. "Tomorrow Never Knows" was the last track to receive a public airing, a few days before the album was issued commercially. Reaction to Revolver was "generally ecstatic", according to MacDonald, with listeners marvelling at the album's "aural invention". To the Beatles' less progressive fans, however, the radical changes in the band's sound were the source of confusion. The editor of the Australian teen magazine Mirabelle wrote: "Everyone, from Brisbane to Bootle, hates that daft song Lennon sang at the end of Revolver." Recalling the release in his 1977 book The Beatles Forever, Nicholas Schaffner commented that whereas the group's more traditional fans warmed to McCartney's new songs, "some people thought Lennon was sprouting complete gibberish, and concluded that the poor lad had slid off the deep end." (Note: In her 2014 book Beatleness, sociologist Candy Leonard quotes the reaction of contemporary fans to the song. One recalls that his anxiety was heightened by the album's sequencing: "['Tomorrow Never Knows'] was the last thing they were leaving me with ... I was hoping they don't completely go this way.")

Aged 16 in 1966, author and academic Nick Bromell says that psychedelic drugs were a year away from "erupting" into American youth culture, and most contemporary listeners heard "strangeness, undiluted and outrageous strangeness" in the song. He adds: "'Tomorrow Never Knows' was an enigma they would understand only gradually, through many listenings and over many months. They heard it first and foremost as a place to dwell, not as an answer or as a deliverance."

== Critical reception ==
In his album review for the NME, Allen Evans expressed confusion over "Tomorrow Never Knows". In response to the lyric's exhortation to "relax and float downstream", he wrote: "But how can you relax with the electronic, outer-space noises, often sounding like seagulls? ... Only Ringo's rock-steady drumming is natural." Peter Jones of Record Mirror commented: "You need some sort of aural microscope to get the message from this. But it's darned compelling listening." Disc and Music Echo's review of Revolver took the form of a track-by-track rundown by Ray Davies of the Kinks, who, in author Steve Turner's opinion, took the opportunity to air his longstanding bitterness towards the Beatles. Davies was unimpressed with the track, and concluded that the band must have had "George Martin tied to a totem pole when they did this".

Writing in the then recently launched Crawdaddy!, Paul Williams derided "Tomorrow Never Knows" and the album's single, "Yellow Submarine", saying of Lennon's song: "A good artist doesn't publish first drafts." Edward Greenfield of The Guardian described the track as "the most remarkable item on a compulsive new record". He said the lyrics were a "curious sort of poetry" that conveyed the concept of "pop-music as a substitute, both for jungle emotions and for the consolations of religion", as teenagers followed in the long societal tradition of disengaging the mind and surrendering "to the tribal leader, the priest, or now the pop-singer". Greenfield concluded by saying, "Thank goodness Lennon is being satirical: at least one hopes so."

Reporting from London for The Village Voice, Richard Goldstein said that Revolver had opened up electronic music as a commercial proposition, adding, "John Cage move over – the Beatles are now reaching a super-receptive audience with electronic soul." He recognised "Tomorrow Never Knows" as the key track in this regard and concluded that "The boundaries [of pop music] will now have to be re-negotiated." Maureen Cleave of The Evening Standard described the song as a "lengthy and monstrous piece of nonsense about love being all and love being everyone, punctuated by what appear to be bagpipes and Zulu noises", adding: "Even this is gripping. Never have I been able to recommend an LP with more conviction."

In 2006, Pitchfork ranked "Tomorrow Never Knows" at number 19 on its list of "The 200 Greatest Songs of the 1960s" and Q magazine placed the track 75th on a list of "The 100 Greatest Songs of All Time". "Tomorrow Never Knows" appears at number 18 on Rolling Stone's list of the best Beatles songs and at number 4 on similar lists compiled by Uncut in 2001 and Mojo in 2006. In 2018, the music staff of Time Out London ranked it at number 2 on their list of the best Beatles songs. Five years later, Mark Beaumont of NME crowned it the greatest Beatles song in his list, writing: "It's possible to trace the origins of most modern music, bar rap, back to The Beatles catalogue. But 'Tomorrow Never Knows' was perhaps their most influential track of all."

== Love remix ==
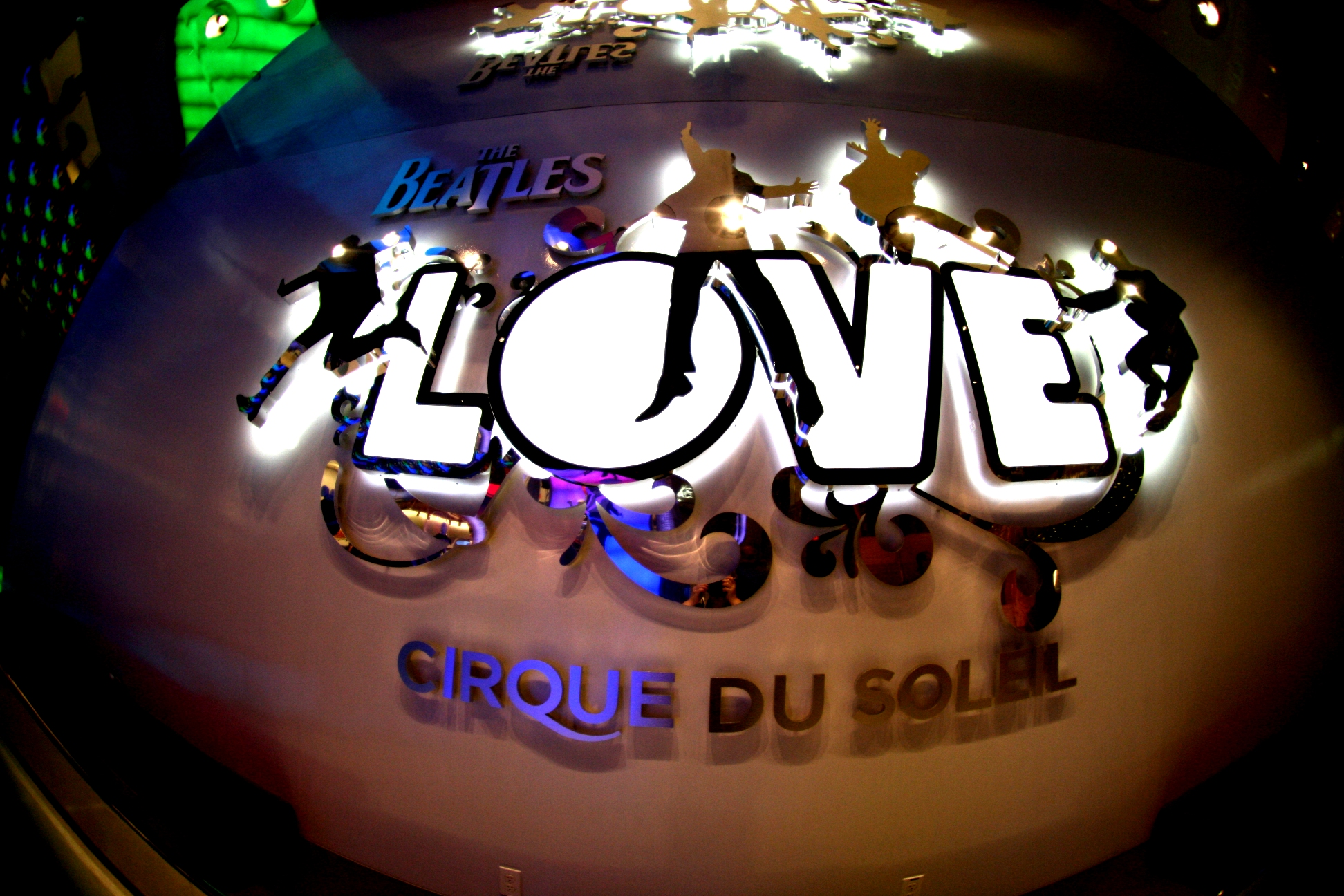
The Love project, which combined "Tomorrow Never Knows" and "Within You Without You"

In 2006, Martin and his son, Giles Martin, remixed 80 minutes of Beatles music for the Las Vegas stage performance Love, a joint venture between Cirque du Soleil and the Beatles' Apple Corps. On the Love album, the rhythm to "Tomorrow Never Knows" was mixed with the vocals and melody from "Within You Without You", creating a different version of the two songs.

Reviewing the album for PopMatters, Zeth Lundy wrote: "The 'Within You Without You'/'Tomorrow Never Knows' mash-up, perhaps the most thrilling and effective track on the entire disc, fuses two especially transcendental songs into one: ... a union of two ambiguous, open-ended declarations of spiritual pursuit." In their chapter on the Beatles' psychedelic period in The Cambridge Companion to the Beatles, authors Russell Reising and Jim LeBlanc describe "Within You Without You/Tomorrow Never Knows" as "the most musically and visually stunning segment" of the Cirque du Soleil show. The Love remix is one of the main songs in The Beatles: Rock Band.

== Influence and legacy ==
=== In popular culture ===
Nicholas Schaffner said that listeners who had been confused by the song's lyrics were most likely unfamiliar with hallucinogenic drugs and Timothy Leary's message, but that the transcendental quality became clear during the build-up to the 1967 Summer of Love. According to Colin Larkin, writing in the Encyclopedia of Popular Music, "Tomorrow Never Knows" has been recognised as "the most effective evocation of a LSD experience ever recorded".

Ian MacDonald says that the song's message represented a revolutionary concept in mainstream society in 1966, and by introducing LSD and Leary's "psychedelic revolution" to Western youth, it is "one of the most socially influential records The Beatles ever made". He adds: "'Tomorrow Never Knows' launched the till-then élite-preserved concept of mind-expansion into pop, simultaneously drawing attention to consciousness-enhancing drugs and the ancient religious philosophies of the Orient, utterly alien to Western thought in their anti-materialism, rapt passivity, and world-sceptical focus on visionary consciousness."

According to Simon Philo, "Tomorrow Never Knows" was the most groundbreaking track on an album that announced the arrival of the "underground London" sound. Barry Miles also sees it as the experimental highpoint of Revolver, which he recalls as an "advertisement for the underground" and a work that resounded on the level of experimental jazz among members of the movement, including those who soon founded the UFO Club.

=== In music ===
Hernan Campbell of Sputnikmusic recognises "Tomorrow Never Knows" as "the most important Psychedelic composition in the history of the genre" and "the epitome of everything that psychedelia stands for". In the opinion of former Mojo editor Paul Trynka, the track benefited most from the Beatles' ability to channel their ideas into a recognisable song form, a discipline that ensured their psychedelic recordings were superior to those by the Grateful Dead and other contemporary San Francisco acts. In the 1997 Mojo feature article "Psychedelia: The 100 Greatest Classics", Jon Savage listed the April 1966 recording as the first item in his chronological history of UK psychedelia, adding that the song "immediately impacted on pop culture". According to Bromell, writing in his book Tomorrow Never Knows: Rock and Psychedelics in the 1960s, the track is "regarded by many critics as the most important rock song of the decade".

In his book Electronic and Experimental Music, Thom Holmes includes "Tomorrow Never Knows" in his list of the "pioneering works" in electronic music. He credits the song with "usher[ing] in a new era in the use of electronic music in rock and pop music". Music historians David Luhrssen and Michael Larson say that with Revolver the Beatles "erased boundaries of time and culture", adding: "Ancient met modern on 'Tomorrow Never Knows' as sitars encountered tape loops. 'Tomorrow Never Knows' reintroduced the sustained repetition of the drone, absent in Western music since the Middle Ages and only recently discovered by avant-garde composer La Monte Young." According to Peter Lavezzoli, in his book The Dawn of Indian Music in the West, "'Tomorrow Never Knows' was the most groundbreaking production to date in popular music" and he says it "still retains a terrifying visceral power".

Musicologist Walter Everett describes Revolver as "an innovative example of electronic music" and says that "Tomorrow Never Knows" was also "highly influential" on psychedelic rock. (Note: In his book Turn on Your Mind, which he titled in recognition of the song, Jim DeRogatis lists Revolver in first place in his "Ultimate Psychedelic Rock Library", and ranks "Tomorrow Never Knows" as the best of all the Beatles' psychedelic rock songs, ahead of "Rain".) He identifies its studio effects and musical form as central to Pink Floyd's "Pow R. Toc H." and recognises the same use of extreme tape-speed manipulation in subsequent recordings by Jimi Hendrix and Frank Zappa, and backwards tapes in the work of Hendrix, Pink Floyd, the Byrds, the Who, the Electric Prunes, Spirit, Tomorrow, Soft Machine and the First Edition. He also identifies the Leslie-treated vocal as a precedent for similar experimentation by Hendrix, the Grateful Dead, the Moody Blues, Cream, Yes, Led Zeppelin and Black Sabbath.

Jon Pareles, the chief pop music critic at The New York Times, has described "Tomorrow Never Knows" as "a portal to decades of music to come". Steve Turner highlights the sound sampling and tape manipulation as having had "a profound effect on everyone from Jimi Hendrix to Jay Z". Having introduced these techniques to mainstream pop, Turner writes, "Tomorrow Never Knows" inspired the sampling that became commonplace over ten years later – such as in Sugarhill Gang's "Rapper's Delight" and other examples of an artist taking a well-known riff or musical motif from an existing song; in David Byrne and Brian Eno's My Life in the Bush of Ghosts, with its use of assorted spoken-word and vocal samples; in recordings by Big Audio Dynamite, which included samples from film soundtracks; and in Moby's Play, with its incorporation of little-known and disparate vocal tracks. In 2011, DJ Spooky said that the Beatles' song remained "in the DNA of so much going on these days" and that the use of "tape collage alone makes it one of the first tracks to use sampling really successfully. I also think that Brian Eno's idea of the studio-as-instrument comes from this kind of recording."

Recalling his introduction to "Tomorrow Never Knows" in 1966, American producer Tony Visconti has said: "It was incredible how the music matched the lyrics and, previous to this album, nobody was writing like that." He also said that Revolver "showed how the studio could be used as an instrument" and contributed to his decision to relocate to London, because, "I had to learn how people made records like this." In his 2004 book Sonic Alchemy: Visionary Music Producers and Their Maverick Recordings, David Howard pairs Martin's work on "Tomorrow Never Knows" with Phil Spector's 1966 production of "River Deep – Mountain High" as the two "visionary achievements in sound" that ensured that "the recording studio was now its own instrument: record production had been elevated into art." (Note: Writing for Classic Rock in 2014, Jon Anderson of Yes recalled first hearing the song in 1966 and likened the experience to "listening to music for the first time". He added that, while he and his fellow musicians already looked to the Beatles as the leaders in pop's evolution at the time, "You've got no concept of how they put it together, and how they came up with the lyrics, or any of it. 'Tomorrow Never Knows' had an effect on me, and on everybody, because it was so revolutionary.")

The song is referenced in the lyric to Oasis' 1995 song "Morning Glory": "Tomorrow never knows what it doesn't know too soon". (Note: In his foreword to Mojo's list of "The 101 Greatest Beatles Songs" in 2006, Noel Gallagher described "Tomorrow Never Knows" as "the sound of the counterculture".) The Chemical Brothers have referred to "Tomorrow Never Knows" as the template for their music; their 1996 track "Setting Sun" is a direct tribute to it, as is "Let Forever Be". John Foxx of Ultravox also cited "Tomorrow Never Knows" as an influence, saying that "As soon as I heard it, I knew it contained almost everything that I would want to investigate for the rest of my life." In 2012, the song was included as the title track of the Beatles' iTunes compilation album Tomorrow Never Knows, which the band's website described as a collection of "the Beatles' most influential rock songs".

=== In television and film ===
The song was parodied, as "L.S. Bumblebee", as part of a satirical sketch on the Swinging London phenomenon in the Not Only ... But Also 1966 Christmas TV special, which included a cameo appearance by Lennon. Sung by comedians Peter Cook and Dudley Moore, both of whom are dressed in Indian clothing, the song evokes the seagull sounds of "Tomorrow Never Knows" through the presence of a bird squawking in the studio, and includes lyrics playing on the sensory contradictions of lines such as "Listen to the colour of your dreams" from the Beatles track.

In 1967, Bruce Conner used "Tomorrow Never Knows" as the soundtrack to his LSD-inspired experimental film Looking for Mushrooms. When reworking the film for a 1996 presentation, Conner replaced the song with an instrumental piece by avant-garde composer Terry Riley.

Aired on 14 October 1967, "Tomorrow Never Knows" was featured as the fifth episode of the third and final season of The Beatles Cartoon. The general premise of the series was to name each episode for a song, with the plot based on the lyrics. In "Tomorrow Never Knows", they fall down an extremely deep well. Upon emerging from the other side, they find themselves inverted. They see themselves to have entered the "inner world", being "the center of the earth". They find themselves among Mesoamerican Mayan people and their pyramids. The natives get startled by them, with all but one of them running away. Seeing the remaining native also being scared, they perform the song, which attracts the others to return. With the Mayans now being fans, the leader introduces four women. The band figures out that not only are they wanted to stay in the city, but to marry these fans. Upon this realization, the band runs away. They find the well again and dive into it, which returns them back to their normal world. Maya is the name of this civilization, and is also the Sanskrit word meaning 'illusion', which fits with the enlightenment theme of the song's lyrics.

The title of the song inspired the title of James Bond's 1997 adventure Tomorrow Never Dies, when screenwriter Bruce Feirstein, still looking for a title, heard the song on the radio. The original title of the film then was Tomorrow Never Lies, but a typo changed it into the eventual title.

"Tomorrow Never Knows" was featured during the final scene of the 2012 Mad Men episode "Lady Lazarus". Don Draper's wife Megan gives him a copy of Revolver, calling his attention to a specific track and suggesting, "Start with this one". Draper, an advertising executive, is struggling to understand youth culture, but after contemplating the song for a few puzzled moments, he shuts it off. The track also played over the closing credits. The rights to the song cost the producers around $250,000, "about five times as much as the typical cost of licensing a song for TV".

The fact that "Tomorrow Never Knows" has been used twice in a non-Apple produced American television program using the original master recording (i.e. master rights) is unique for a Beatles song. Whether it is true or not, The Wall Street Journal reported that Lionsgate claimed the 2012 use of this song marked "the first time a master recording by the Beatles has been licensed for a television show."

== Personnel ==
According to Ian MacDonald, except where noted:

The Beatles

- John Lennon – vocals, Hammond organ, Mellotron, tape loops
- Paul McCartney – bass guitar, tape loops, backwards guitar solo
- George Harrison – sitar, tambura, lead guitar, tape loops
- Ringo Starr – drums, tambourine, tape loops

Additional musician

- George Martin – tack piano

== Sources ==
- The Beatles (2000). The Beatles Anthology. San Francisco, CA: Chronicle Books. ISBN 0-8118-2684-8.
- Brend, Mark (2005). Strange Sounds: Offbeat Instruments and Sonic Experiments in Pop. San Francisco, CA: Backbeat Books. ISBN 9-780879-308551.
- Bromell, Nick (2002). Tomorrow Never Knows: Rock and Psychedelics in the 1960s. Chicago, IL: University of Chicago Press. ISBN 0-226-07562-1.
- Brown, Peter; Gaines, Steven (1980). The Love You Make: An Insider's Story of The Beatles. Methuen Publishing. ISBN 978-0-451-20735-7.
- Clayson, Alan (2003). George Harrison. London: Sanctuary. ISBN 1-86074-489-3.
- Castleman, Harry; Podrazik, Walter J. (1976). All Together Now: The First Complete Beatles Discography 1961–1975. New York, NY: Ballantine Books. ISBN 0-345-25680-8.
- DeRogatis, Jim (2003). Turn on Your Mind: Four Decades of Great Psychedelic Rock. Milwaukee, WI: Hal Leonard. ISBN 978-0-634-05548-5.
- Echard, William (2017). Psychedelic Popular Music: A History through Musical Topic Theory. Bloomington, Indiana: Indiana University Press. ISBN 978-0253026590.
- Everett, Walter (1999). The Beatles as Musicians: Revolver Through the Anthology. New York, NY: Oxford University Press. ISBN 0-19-512941-5.
- Harris, Mark (2012). "Countercultural Intoxication: An Aesthetics of Transformation". In Auther, Elissa; Lerner, Adam (eds.). West of Center: Art and the Counterculture Experiment in America, 1965–1977. Minneapolis, MN: University of Minnesota Press. ISBN 978-0-8166-7725-2.
- Harry, Bill (2000). The Beatles Encyclopedia. London: Virgin Publishing. ISBN 0-7535-0481-2.
- Hertsgaard, Mark (1996). A Day in the Life: The Music and Artistry of the Beatles. London: Pan Books. ISBN 0-330-33891-9.
- Holmes, Thom (2012). Electronic and Experimental Music: Technology, Music, and Culture (4th edn). New York, NY: Routledge. ISBN 978-0-415-89636-8.
- Howard, David N. (2004). Sonic Alchemy: Visionary Music Producers and Their Maverick Recordings. Milwaukee, WI: Hal Leonard. ISBN 0-634-05560-7.
- Lavezzoli, Peter (2006). The Dawn of Indian Music in the West. New York, NY: Continuum. ISBN 0-8264-2819-3.
- Leonard, Candy (2014). Beatleness: How the Beatles and Their Fans Remade the World. New York, NY: Arcade Publishing. ISBN 978-1-62872-417-2.
- Lewisohn, Mark (2005) [1988]. The Complete Beatles Recording Sessions: The Official Story of the Abbey Road Years 1962–1970. London: Bounty Books. ISBN 978-0-7537-2545-0.
- Luhrssen, David; Larson, Michael (2017). Encyclopedia of Classic Rock. Santa Barbara, CA: Greenwood. ISBN 978-1-4408-3513-1.
- MacDonald, Ian (1998). Revolution in the Head: The Beatles' Records and the Sixties. London: Pimlico. ISBN 978-0-7126-6697-8.
- MacDonald, Ian (2005). Revolution in the Head: The Beatles' Records and the Sixties (2nd rev. ed.). London: Pimlico. ISBN 1-84413-828-3.
- Martin, George; with Pearson, William (1994). Summer of Love: The Making of Sgt. Pepper. London: Macmillan. ISBN 0-333-60398-2.
- Miles, Barry (1997). Paul McCartney: Many Years from Now. Vintage. ISBN 0-7493-8658-4.
- Miles, Barry (2001). The Beatles Diary Volume 1: The Beatles Years. London: Omnibus Press. ISBN 0-7119-8308-9.
- Miles, Barry (July 2006). "Revolver: The Tripping Point". Mojo. pp. 70–77.
- Pedler, Dominic (2003). The Songwriting Secrets of the Beatles. London: Omnibus Press. ISBN 978-0-7119-8167-6.
- Philo, Simon (2015). British Invasion: The Crosscurrents of Musical Influence. Lanham, MD: Rowman & Littlefield. ISBN 978-0-8108-8626-1.
- Reising, Russell (2002). "Introduction: 'Of the beginning'". In Reising, Russell (ed.). 'Every Sound There Is': The Beatles' Revolver and the Transformation of Rock and Roll. Farnham, UK: Ashgate Publishing. ISBN 978-0-7546-0557-7.
- Reising, Russell; LeBlanc, Jim (2009). "Magical Mystery Tours, and Other Trips: Yellow submarines, newspaper taxis, and the Beatles' psychedelic years". In Womack, Kenneth (ed.). The Cambridge Companion to the Beatles. Cambridge, UK: Cambridge University Press. ISBN 978-0-521-68976-2.
- Rodriguez, Robert (2012). Revolver: How the Beatles Reimagined Rock 'n' Roll. Milwaukee, WI: Backbeat Books. ISBN 978-1-61713-009-0.
- Savage, Jon (2015). 1966: The Year the Decade Exploded. London: Faber & Faber. ISBN 978-0-571-27763-6.
- Spitz, Bob (2005). The Beatles: The Biography. New York, NY: Little, Brown and Company. ISBN 1-84513-160-6.
- Schaffner, Nicholas (1978). The Beatles Forever. New York, NY: McGraw-Hill. ISBN 0-07-055087-5.
- Sheff, David (2000) [1981]. All We Are Saying: The Last Major Interview with John Lennon and Yoko Ono. New York, NY: St. Martin's Press. ISBN 0-312-25464-4.
- Turner, Steve (2016). Beatles '66: The Revolutionary Year. New York, NY: Ecco. ISBN 978-0-06-247558-9.
- Winn, John C. (2009). That Magic Feeling: The Beatles' Recorded Legacy, Volume Two, 1966–1970. New York, NY: Three Rivers Press. ISBN 978-0-307-45239-9.
- Womack, Kenneth (2014). The Beatles Encyclopedia: Everything Fab Four. Santa Barbara, CA: ABC-CLIO. ISBN 978-0-313-39171-2.
