= Double tracking =

Audio recording technique

Audio example of double tracking with three guitar parts with drums and bass.

Audio example of double tracking with saturated electric guitars playing chords. The part has been played twice and panned left and right.

Double tracking or doubling is an audio recording technique in which a performer sings or plays along with their own prerecorded performance, usually to produce a stronger or bigger sound than can be obtained with a single voice or instrument. It is a form of overdubbing; the distinction comes from the doubling of a part, as opposed to recording a different part to go with the first. The effect can be further enhanced by panning one of the performances hard left and the other hard right in the stereo field.

== Principle ==
In rock and metal music, it is very common to double-track guitars to achieve a massive sound. In the case of distorted electric guitars, one part is recorded and then the same part is recorded twice; both are then panned left and right. The small variations in attack and timing in each performance create two distinct guitar tracks, which give a large stereo image.

Different guitars, amps, cabinets and microphones can be used to get a different sound on the left and on the right. In certain cases, guitars can even be recorded four times; this method is called quad tracking.

== Automatic double tracking ==
Artificial or automatic double tracking, also known as ADT, was developed at Abbey Road Studios by engineers recording the Beatles in the 1960s. The effect is used to give one singer a fuller sound. It used variable-speed tape recorders connected in such a way as to mimic the effect created by double tracking. ADT produced a unique sound that could be imitated but not precisely duplicated by later analog and digital delay devices, which are capable of producing an effect called doubling echo.

Automatic double tracking does not yield the same results as a real recording of two separate tracks panned left and right: the listener still perceives it as one doubled unique track.

== Examples ==
Double tracking was pioneered by Buddy Holly. It was an integral part of The Four Seasons' signature sound in the early 1960s; lead singer Frankie Valli has, throughout his career, employed a live "double" to emulate the sound in live performances, which led to later accusations of lip syncing as Valli aged. John Lennon particularly enjoyed using the technique for his vocals while in the Beatles. Lennon's post-Beatles albums frequently employed doubling echo on his vocals in place of the ADT. Some critics complained that the effect gave the impression that Lennon recorded all his vocals in a bathroom, but some performers, like Black Francis and Paul Simon, value the rich echo chamber sound that it produces. Paul McCartney also commonly used this technique for his vocals while in the Beatles. Another notable example of double tracking can be seen in the 1991 hit album Nevermind, where producer Butch Vig would often double the vocals of lead singer Kurt Cobain and several electric guitars to create a "sound big enough," as Vig once put it in an interview.

== See also ==
- Multitrack recording
- Bleed-through
