= Abbey Road Studios =

Recording studio in London, England

Coordinates: 51°31′55″N 0°10′42″W

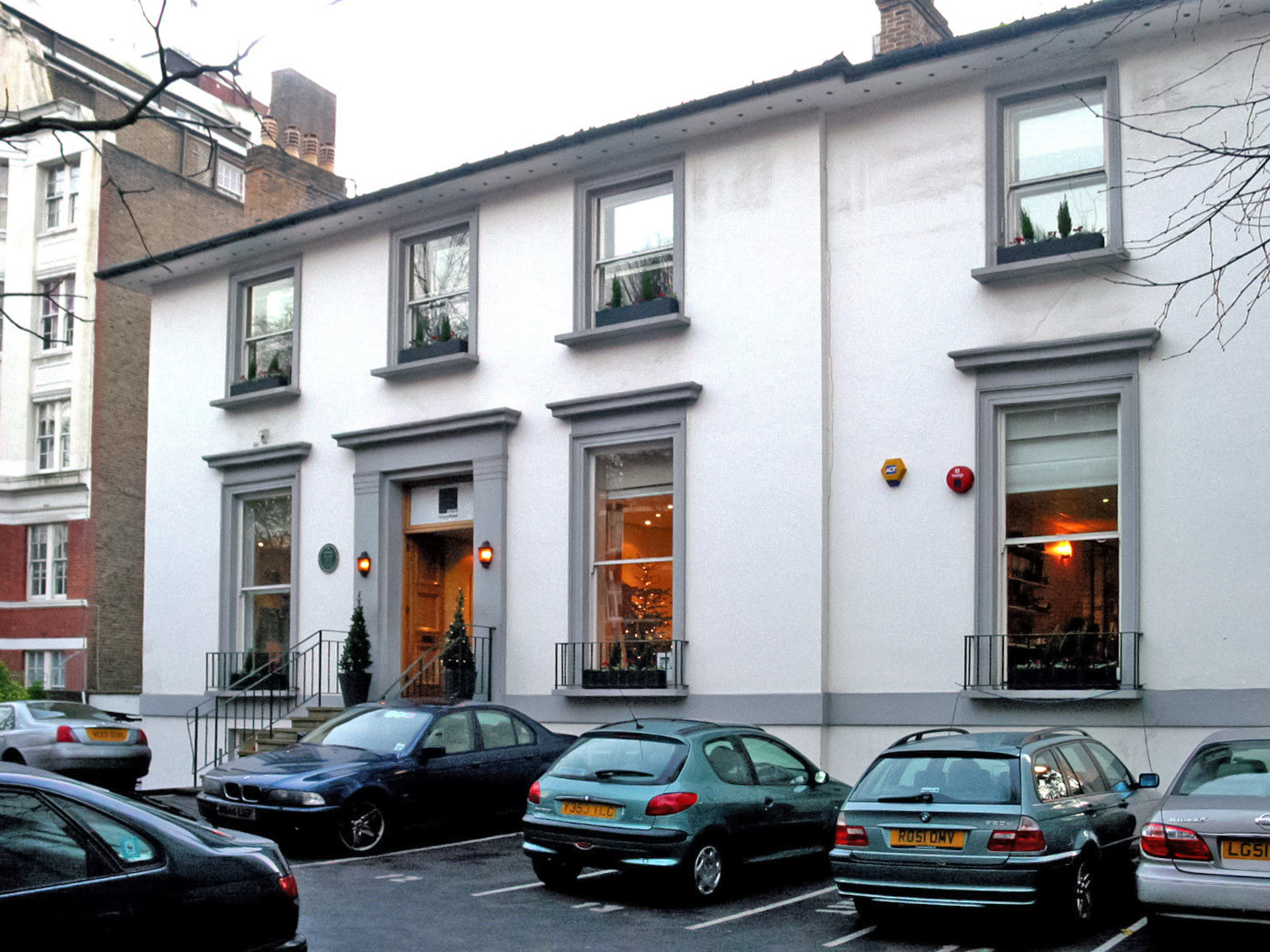
- Abbey Road Studios in December 2005
- Formerly: EMI Recording Studios
- Type: Recording studio
- Industry: Music
- Founded: 12 November 1931; 94 years ago
- Founder: Gramophone Company
- Headquarters: St John's Wood, City of Westminster, London, England
- Parent: Virgin Records
- Website: abbeyroad.com

Abbey Road Studios
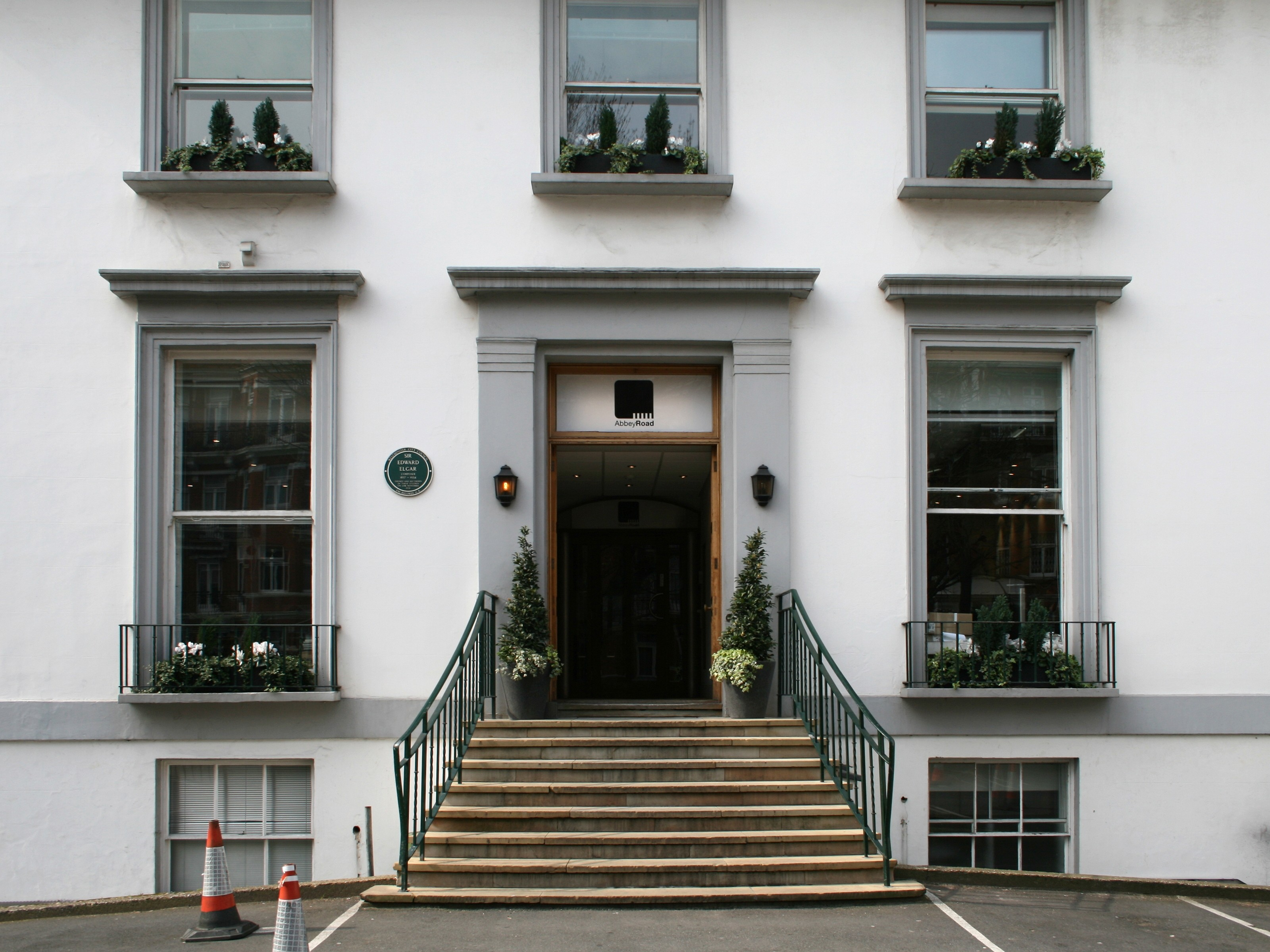
- Interactive map of Abbey Road Studios

History
- Built: 1831; 195 years ago

Site notes
- Architectural style: Georgian

Listed Building – Grade II
- Official name: Abbey Road Studios
- Designated: 23 February 2010
- Reference no.: 1393688

Listed Building – Grade II
- Official name: Zebra crossing near Abbey Road Studios
- Designated: 21 December 2010
- Reference no.: 1396390

Abbey Road Studios (formerly EMI Recording Studios) is a music recording studio at 3 Abbey Road, St John's Wood, City of Westminster, London. It was established in November 1931 by the Gramophone Company, a predecessor of British music company EMI, which owned it until Universal Music Group (UMG) took control of part of it in 2013. It is ultimately owned by UMG's subsidiary Virgin Records.

The studio's most notable client was the Beatles, who used the studio – particularly its Studio Two room – as the venue for many of the innovative recording techniques that they adopted throughout the 1960s. In 1976, the studio was renamed from EMI to Abbey Road.

In 2009, Abbey Road came under threat of sale to property developers. In response, the British Government protected the site, granting it English Heritage Grade II listed status in 2010, thereby preserving the building from any major alterations.

== History ==
=== 1920s–1940s ===
Originally a nine-bedroom Georgian townhouse built in 1831 on the footpath leading to Kilburn Abbey, the building was later converted to flats where the best-known resident was Maundy Gregory, who was famous (or infamous) for selling political honours.

In 1929, the Gramophone Company acquired the premises. The property benefited from a large garden behind the townhouse, which permitted a much larger building to be constructed to the rear; thus, the Georgian façade belies the true dimension of the building. The architectural partnership Wallis, Gilbert and Partners was hired to convert the property into a recording studio, an unusual request at the time. Three purpose-built studios were constructed and the existing house was adapted for use as administration offices. Pathé filmed the opening of the studios in November 1931 when Edward Elgar conducted the London Symphony Orchestra in recording sessions of his music. In 1934, the inventor of stereo sound, Alan Blumlein, recorded Mozart's Jupiter Symphony which was conducted by Thomas Beecham at the studios.

The neighbouring house is also owned by the studio and used to accommodate musicians. During the mid-20th century, the studio was extensively used by British conductor Sir Malcolm Sargent, whose house was located near the studio building.

The Gramophone Company merged with Columbia Graphophone Company to form Electric and Musical Industries (EMI) in 1931, and the studios later became known as EMI Recording Studios. In 1936 cellist Pablo Casals became the first to record Johann Sebastian Bach's Cello Suites No. 1 & 2 at the command of EMI head Fred Gaisberg. The recordings went on to spur a revolution among Bach aficionados and cellists alike. "Fats" Waller played the Compton organ there.

Glenn Miller recorded at the Abbey Road studios during World War II, when he was based in the United Kingdom.

In 1931, an echo chamber was built in the studios, in the early days of artificial reverberation.

=== 1950s–1970s ===
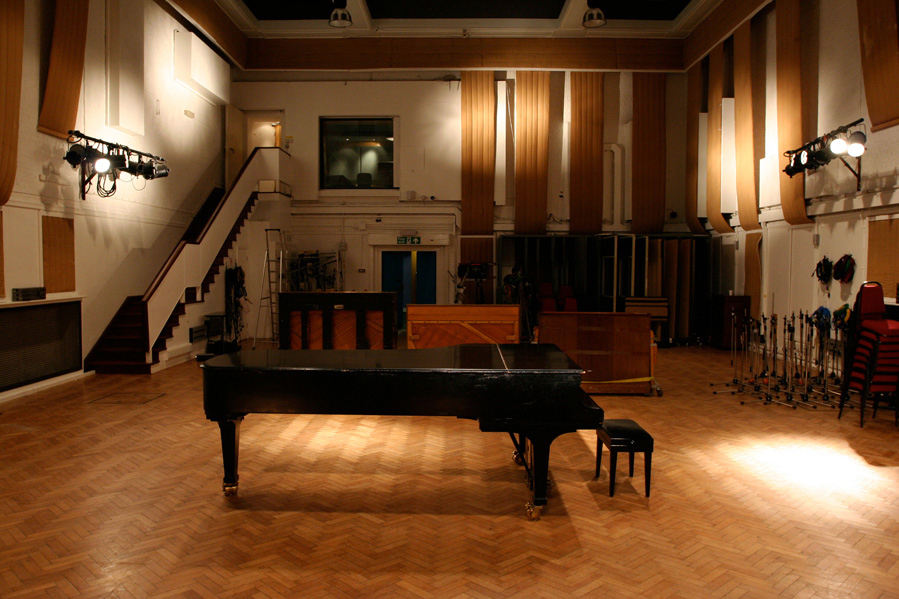
Pianos used by many recording artists over the years in Studio Two of Abbey Road Studios

Studio Two was remodeled in 1957, with its control room moved upstairs and a large wooden staircase installed descending into the studio.

In 1958, Studio Two at EMI became a centre for rock and roll music when Cliff Richard and the Drifters (later Cliff Richard and the Shadows) recorded "Move It" there, and later pop music material.

EMI is closely associated with the Beatles, who recorded almost all of their albums and hits there between 1962 and 1970 using the four-track REDD mixing console designed by Peter K. Burkowitz. The Beatles named their 1969 album Abbey Road after the road where the studios are situated. Iain Macmillan took the album's cover photograph outside the studios, with the result that the nearby zebra crossing has become a place of pilgrimage for Beatles fans. It has been a tradition for visitors to pay homage to the band by writing on the wall in front of the building even though it is painted over every three months. In December 2010, the zebra crossing at Abbey Road was given a Grade II listed status.

After becoming the studio's general manager in 1974, Ken Townsend began a rebranding effort to capitalise on the studio's connection with the Beatles. To emphasise the studio's independence, Townsend commissioned the artist Alan Brown to design a unique logo, and in 1976 the facility officially changed names from EMI Studios to Abbey Road Studios. (Note: A 2012 article in Sound on Sound magazine instead dates the name change to 1970.) Having previously been mostly restricted to UK-based EMI acts, the studio's name-change served the added purpose of encouraging non-EMI acts to record at the studio.

Notable producers and sound engineers who have worked at Abbey Road include Fred Gaisberg (who had first recorded Enrico Caruso in Milan in 1902, and had set up the first recording studio in London at Maiden Lane in 1898), Walter Legge, George Martin, Tutti Camarata, Geoff Emerick, Norman "Hurricane" Smith, Ken Scott, Mike Stone, Alan Parsons, Peter Vince, Malcolm Addey, Peter Bown, Richard Langham, Phil McDonald, John Kurlander, Richard Lush and Ken Townsend, who invented the studio effect known as automatic double tracking (ADT). The chief mastering engineer at Abbey Road was Chris "Vinyl" Blair, who started his career as a tape deck operator.

From 1966 to 1971, the Walt Disney Music Company recorded vocals, instrumentals and narration and dialogue for over a dozen albums at Abbey Road for U.S. and international release, including The Aristocats, Bedknobs and Broomsticks, Doctor Dolittle, Heidi and The Wizard of Oz. Most of the sessions included The Mike Sammes Singers, who backed up The Beatles on "I Am the Walrus" and "Good Night".

In 1979, EMI commissioned the British jazz fusion band Morrissey–Mullen to record Britain's first digitally recorded single record at Abbey Road Studios.

=== 1980s–2010s ===
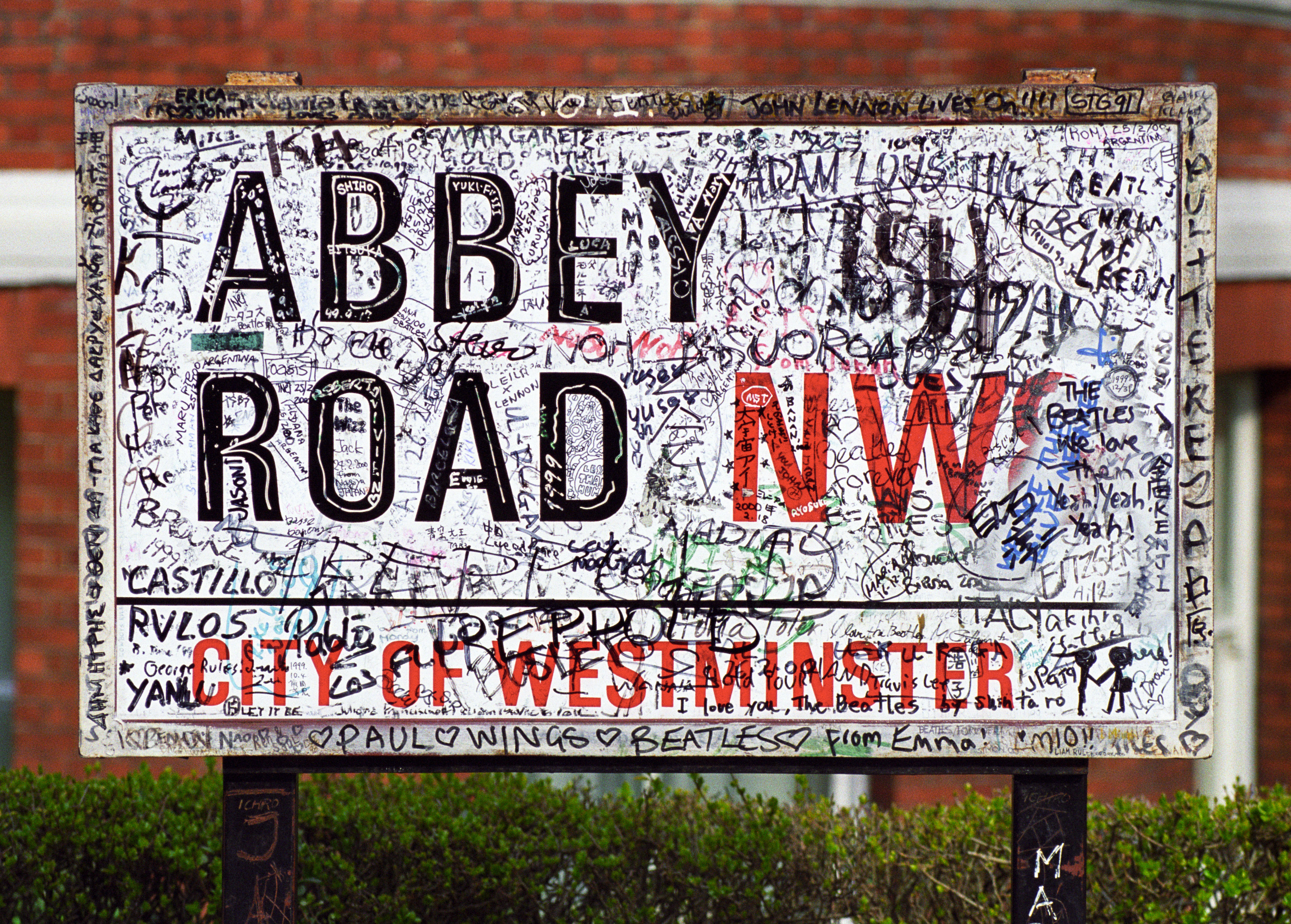
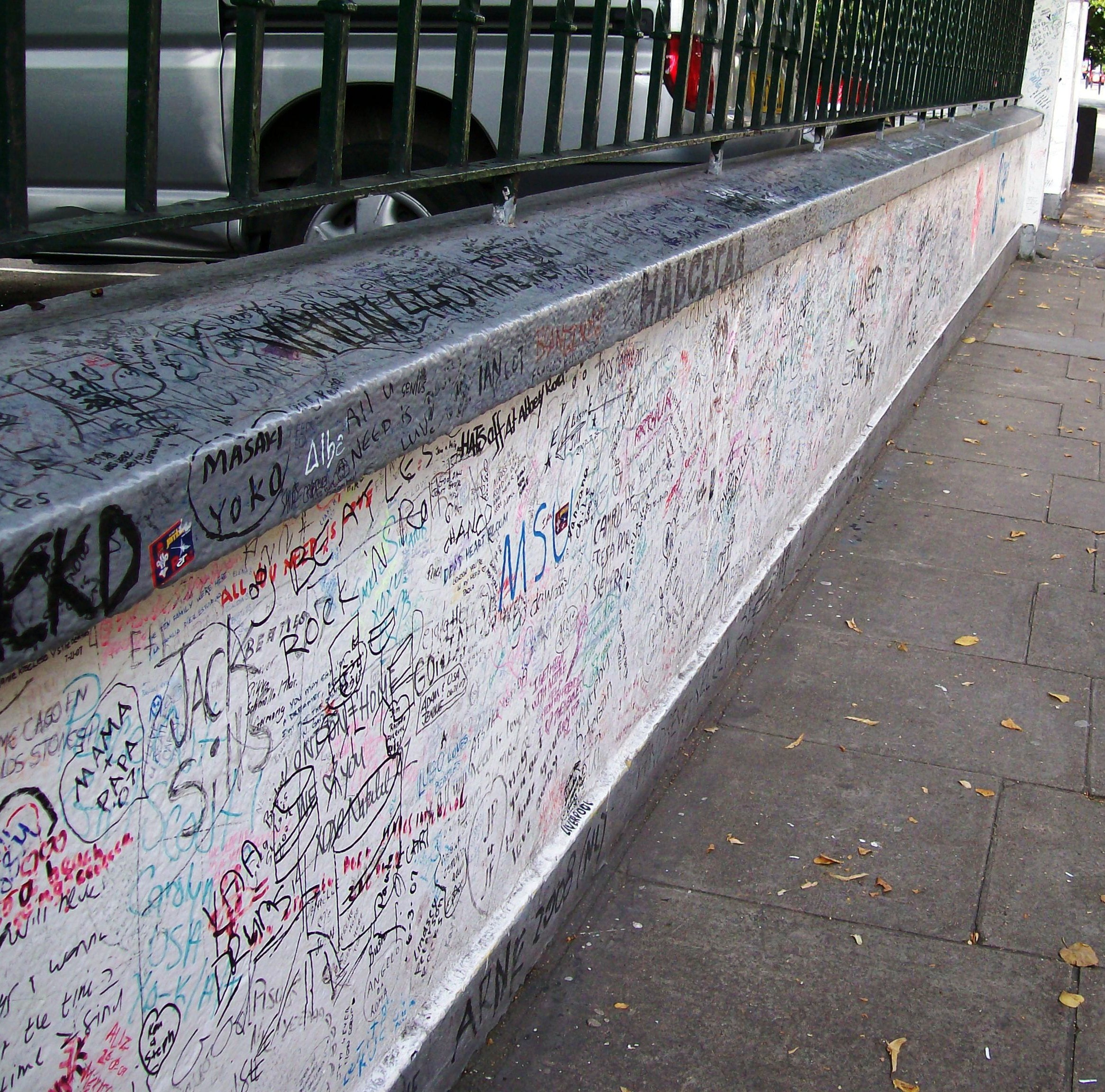
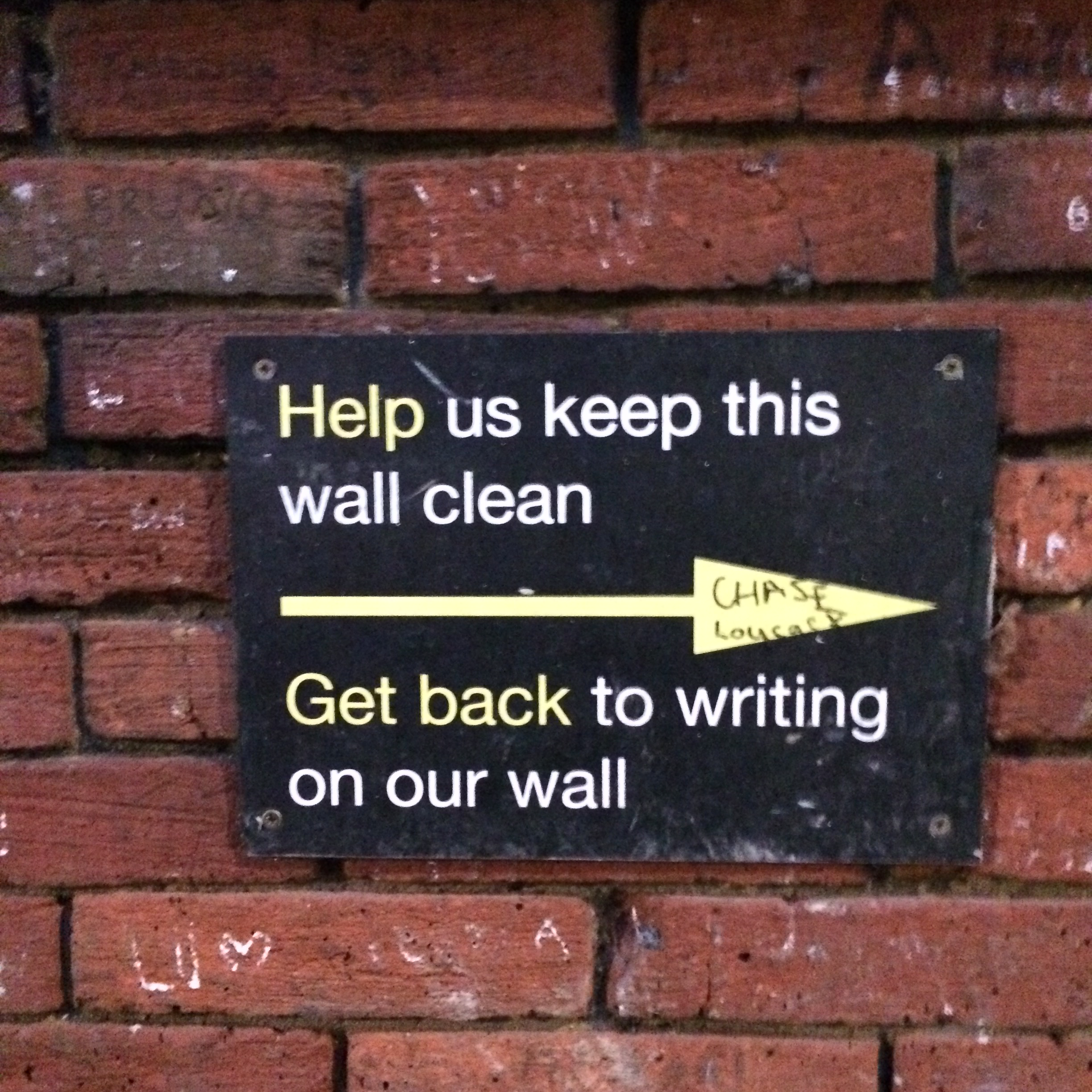
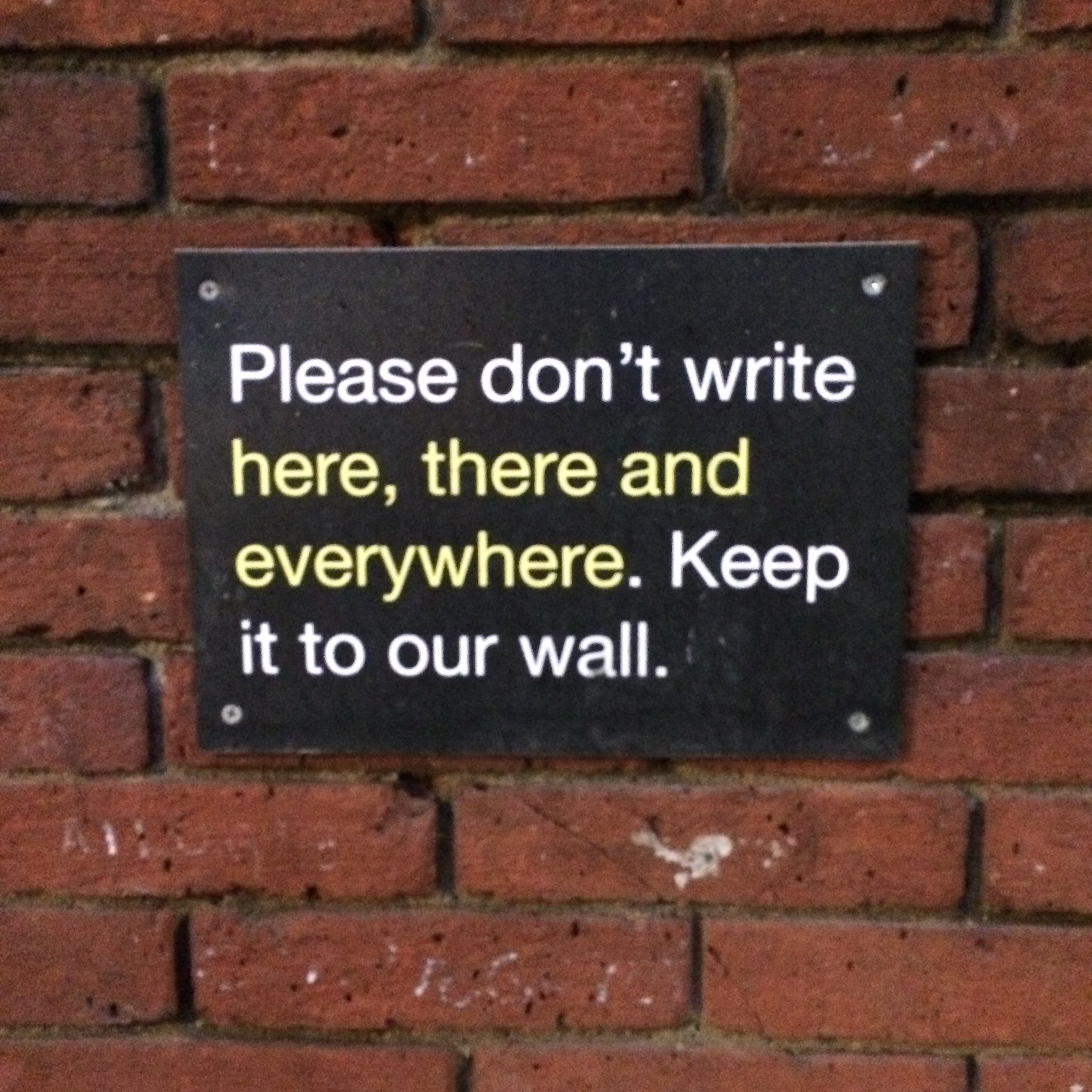
Abbey Road has become a London tourist attraction, with the studio erecting Beatles lyric-themed signs encouraging fans to restrict graffitiing to the studio's property.

Abbey Road Studios got its start in the film scoring business in 1980 when Anvil Post Production formed a partnership with the studio, called Anvil-Abbey Road Screen Sound; with Raiders of the Lost Ark being the first major film soundtrack recorded in Studio 1. The partnership started when Anvil was left without a scoring stage when Denham Studios were demolished. It ended in 1984 when EMI merged with Thorn Electrical Industries to become Thorn EMI. Abbey Road's success in the scoring business continued after the partnership ended.

From 18 July to 11 September 1983, the public had a rare opportunity to see inside the Studio Two room, where the Beatles made most of their records. While a new mixing console was being installed in the control room, the studio was used to host a video presentation called The Beatles at Abbey Road. The soundtrack to the video had a number of recordings that were not made commercially available until the release of The Beatles Anthology project over a decade later.

In September 2012, with the takeover of EMI, the studio became the property of Universal Music. It was not one of the entities that were sold to Warner Music as part of Parlophone and instead the control of Abbey Road Studios Ltd was transferred to Virgin Records.

== Sale attempt ==
On 17 February 2010, it was reported that EMI had put the studios up for sale because of increasing debts. There was reported interest by property developers in redeveloping the site into luxury flats. It had also been reported there was a possibility the studios could be purchased by the National Trust to preserve what was in effect a historical building. A Save Abbey Road Studios campaign attempted to ensure the premises remained a working studio.

On 21 February 2010, EMI stated it planned to keep the studio and was looking for an investor to help finance a "revitalisation" project. Meanwhile, the British government declared Abbey Road Studios a Grade II listed building which protected it from major alteration. The following December, the pedestrian crossing at Abbey Road was separately Grade II listed on the National Heritage List.

Paul McCartney, speaking to BBC Newsnight on 16 February 2010, said there had been efforts to save Abbey Road by "a few people who have been associated with the studio for a long time," although he did not name them or include himself among them. "I have so many memories there with the Beatles," McCartney said, "It still is a great studio. So it would be lovely for someone to get a thing together to save it."

== Abbey Road Institute ==
In March 2015, Abbey Road Institute was founded as a school for music production and audio engineering. In addition to the London location, Abbey Road Institute has schools in Amsterdam, Johannesburg, Miami, Paris and Sydney. All of the campuses offer the Advanced Diploma in Music Production and Sound Engineering. Some campuses offer additional short courses.

In April 2021, Abbey Road Institute London expanded and moved into and reopened Angel Recording Studios in Islington, North London. The building now accommodates students in the Institute's dedicated teaching spaces and studio and welcomes clients to Studio One.

In November 2025, Abbey Road Institute Mumbai opened, the first school in South Asia. A new campus in Los Angeles is set to open on 26 October 2026.

== The Studios ==
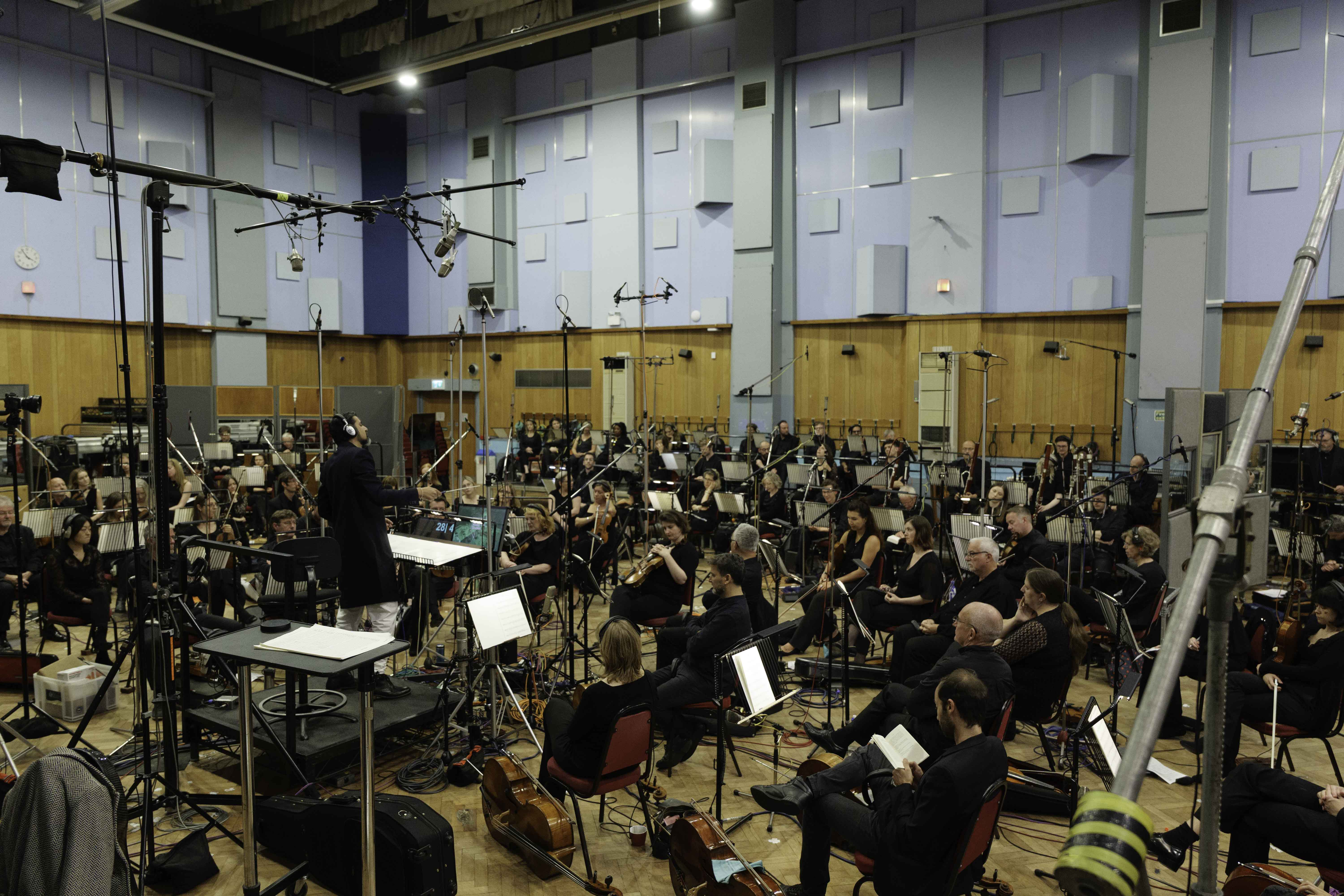
Studio One

=== Studio One ===
Studio One is the world's largest purpose-built recording studio, and can accommodate a 100-piece orchestra alongside a 100-member choir. It has been used by Edward Elgar, Igor Stravinsky, Sergei Prokofiev and Maria Callas.

=== Studio Two ===
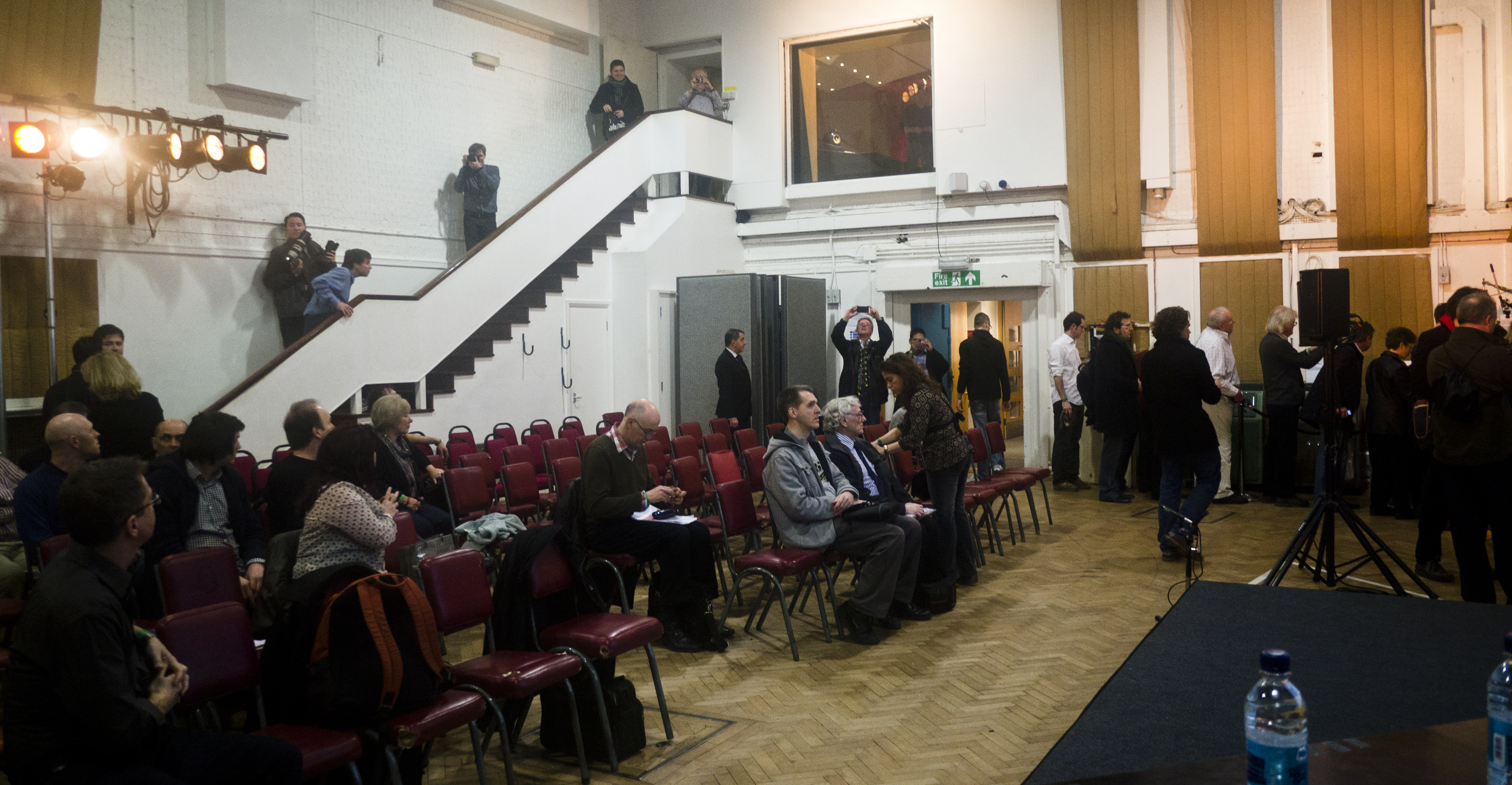
Studio Two

Studio Two is the most popular room, and was the main studio used by the Beatles.

=== Studio Three ===
Studio Three is the smallest studio and has been used by the Beatles, Queen, Pink Floyd and Lady Gaga.
