= The Cat's Whisker =

Coffee bar in Kingly Street, Soho, London

Coordinates: 51°30′43.5″N 0°8′19″W

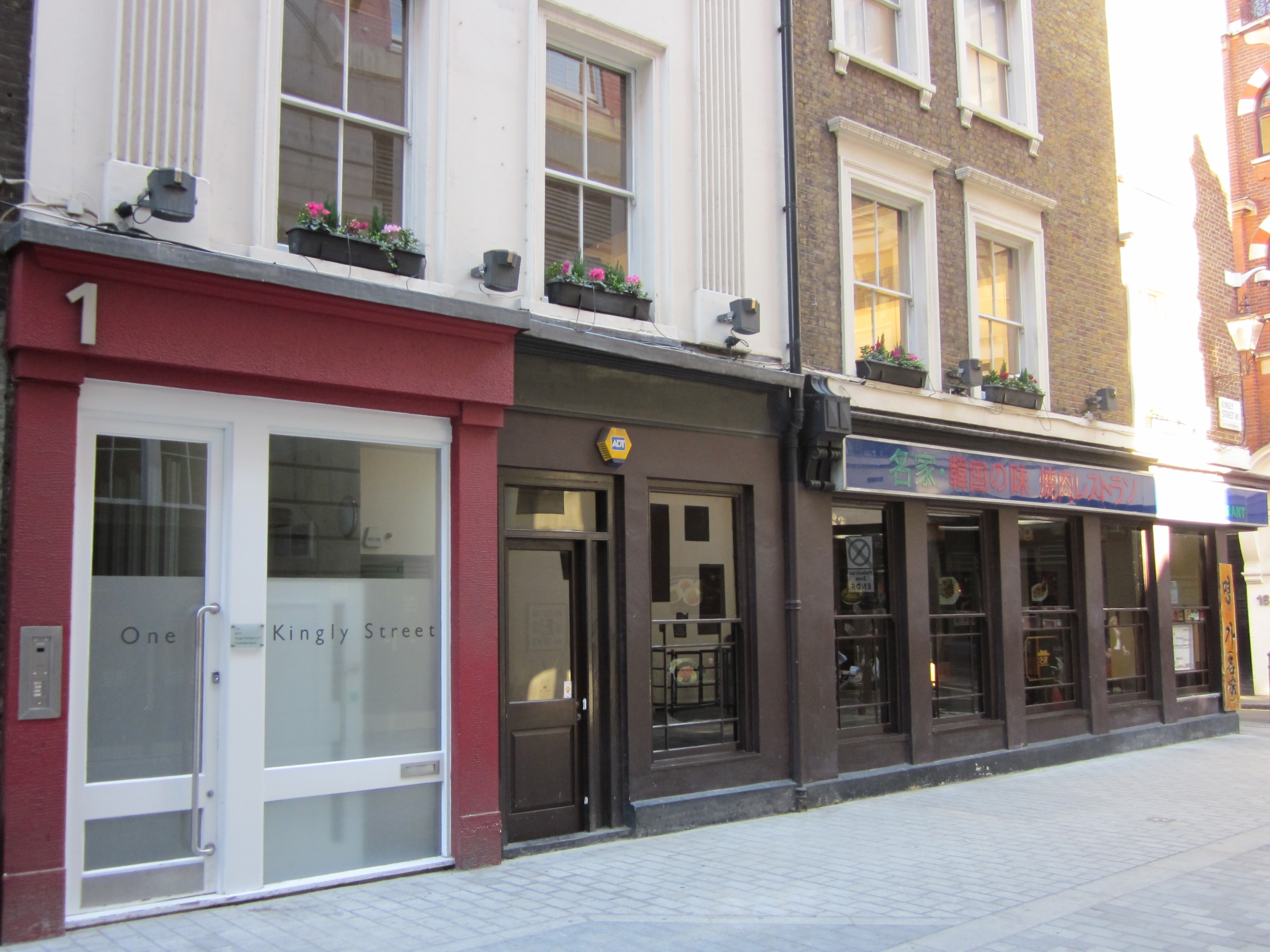
1 Kingly St just after the new paving was laid in the summer of 2010

The Cat's Whisker was a coffee bar situated at 1 Kingly Street, Soho, London, during the mid-late 1950s. The venue was a hub of excitement for London's young people, offering a vibrant mix of Spanish dancing, live rock 'n roll, and skiffle music.

It saw the invention of a new style of 'dancing' known as hand-jive, a complicated pattern of hand gestures only, and claps at various parts of the body, as there was no space to maneuver in the crowded basement. The venue was closed in 1958, owing to overcrowding.

== History ==
The Cat's Whisker coffee bar was started by entrepreneur Peter Evans, and was one of the first to have a jukebox. It was located in the middle of Soho at the corner of Kingly Street and Beak Street, between Carnaby Street and Regent Street, around the corner from the toy store Hamleys. It attracted large crowds, including ice skating champions, international rugby players, journalists and students, for espresso (priced at a shilling per cup) and music. The venue was situated in the heart of theatreland, and catered for diners before or after the theatre.

In 1956, Evans hired Hank Huffner to refurbish the bar's cellar as an exclusive 'live' venue. The L-shaped cellar had primitive paintings of cats chasing mice on the walls and six stone cats as light-sources round the walls. The basement was exclusive, there being no indication of its existence on the ground floor.

At first, the cellar had the feel of "Hernando's Hideaway", with regular performances from guitarist Jose Feller and dancer Carmen Ballisteras, formerly with the Ballet Espagnol de Pilar Lopez.

Together with The 2i's Coffee Bar, The Cat's Whisker later spearheaded the nascent pop scene, with appearances by 'before-they-were-famous' musicians like Cliff Richard, Lonnie Donegan, Terry Dene, Tommy Steele, guitarist Barry Warren, the Chas McDevitt Skiffle Group and other artists who dropped by to unwind after working the nearby nightspots Churchill's, the Bag O'Nails, Coconut Grove, Cabaret and Eve. Like Feller and Ballisteras, the musicians were generally "paid with coffee and Cokes".

Freelance photographer Ken Russell, in his pre-film director days, captured the 'energy and excitement' of this night life in Soho for Picture Post and these atmospheric images resurfaced in the Soho Nights exhibition by The Photographers' Gallery, London, December 2008 – February 2009. Russell recalls: "I remember the atmosphere was very jolly. So I made a number of visits to the Cat's Whisker. Cliff Richard used to appear there. I used to join in the hand-jiving."

When the police closed down The Cat's Whisker because of overcrowding in 1958, Evans opened the first of the Angus Steak Houses at this venue, before later starting the London-based David Hicks–decorated restaurant chain that bore his own name, Peter Evans Eating Houses, and the upmarket Raffles night club in King's Road, Chelsea.

As of 2009, The Cat's Whisker had been replaced by the Korean restaurant Myung Ga.
