= The 2i's Coffee Bar =

Coffee bar in London, England

Coordinates: 51°30′45″N 0°7′58″W

2i's Coffee Bar
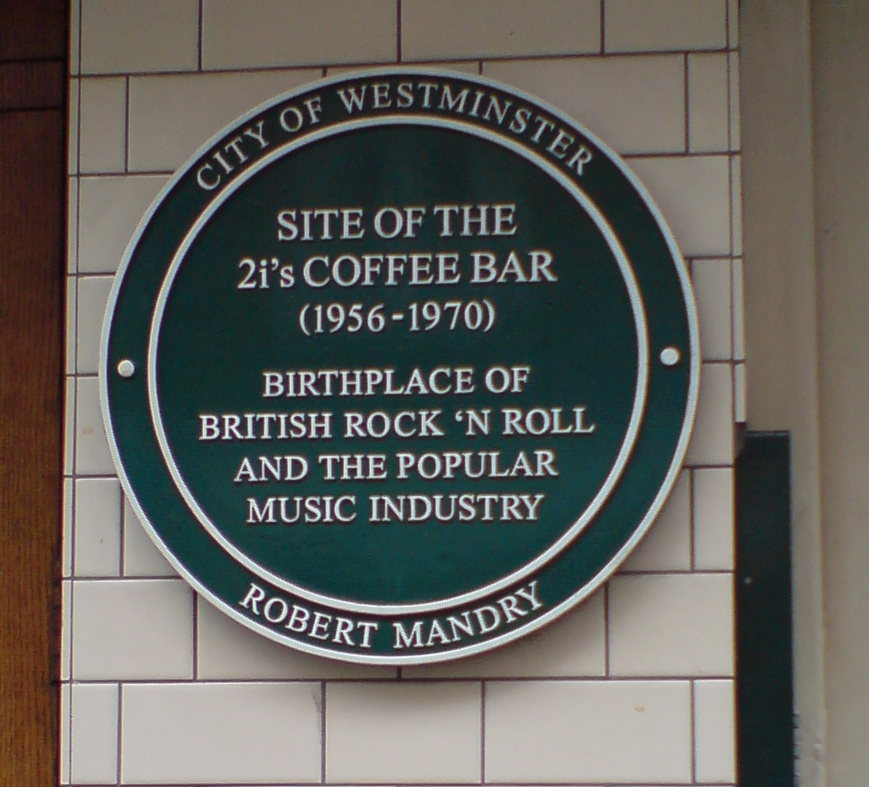
- Interactive map of 2i's Coffee Bar
- Location: Old Compton Street; London, W1; United Kingdom
- Owner: Paul Lincoln
- Type: Coffeehouse
- Public transit: Leicester Square

Construction
- Opened: 1956
- Closed: 1970

The 2i's Coffee Bar was a coffeehouse at 59 Old Compton Street in Soho, London, that was open from 1956 to 1970. It played a formative role in the emergence of Britain's skiffle and rock and roll music culture in the late 1950s, and several major stars including Tommy Steele and Cliff Richard were first discovered performing there.

== History ==
=== Founding and ownership ===
The name of the 2i's derived from earlier owners, brothers Gussie and Freddie and later Bakhtyar (Buck) Irani, with another brother Bailey helping occasionally, who ran the venue until the end of the 1950s.It was then taken over by Paul Lincoln, an Australian professional wrestler known as "Dr Death", and Ray Hunter, a wrestling promoter and professional wrestler known as Rebel Ray Hunter. They opened it as a coffee bar on 22 April 1956. Tom Littlewood, previously its doorman and a judo instructor, became its manager in 1958. According to Brian Gregg, former bassist for Johnny Kidd & the Pirates and The Tornados, Lincoln's interest in the property was initially less to do with the coffee bar and more to do with the storeys above it, which provided temporary accommodation for foreign wrestlers whom Lincoln and Hunter were promoting.

=== Features ===
The basement of the coffee bar had live music; the acts made use of a small, 18-inch-high stage. Lincoln and Hunter started putting on skiffle groups; the first resident group were the Vipers, who included Wally Whyton. According to the band's washboard player John Pilgrim, they secured the residency after Whyton entered the 2i's when it started raining during a set the band were playing on the back of a lorry nearby during the Soho Fair. Within a couple of weeks the band's performances at the venue had begun to attract a large following through word of mouth. It soon won a clientele attracted because of its rock'n'roll music, and for a time became "the most famous music venue in England," and attracted talent spotters and music promoters such as Jack Good, Larry Parnes and Don Arden. In November 1957 Good arranged for an episode of the BBC's Six-Five Special to be broadcast from the 2i's, with Tommy Steele as host. The broadcast is particularly notable for launching the career of Adam Faith, who appeared as vocalist with the then resident band, the Worried Men.

The coffee bar allowed standing room for about 20 people, and had a serving counter with an espresso coffee machine, orange juice dispenser, and sandwich display case. The coffee bar was run by Jon Vickers-Jones who was the assistant manager. He would help with setting up the stage area for the musicians and would often record them rehearsing on a Grundig Tape recorder. A door at the back led to the manager's office, and a narrow stairway led down to a "dismal and dark cellar about the size of a large bedroom, lit by a couple of weak bulbs. At one end was the small 18-inch stage made of milk crates with planks on top of them. There was just one microphone, left over from the Boer War, and some speakers up on the wall." The stage area can very briefly be seen in Rank Studio's 1959 episode "Coffee Bar", from their Look at Life, available on Network DVD, in a clip featuring future Shadows drummer Brian Bennett.

=== Roster of stars ===
Several recording stars were discovered at, or performed at, the 2i's coffee bar, including Rory Blackwell, Tommy Steele, The Vipers Skiffle Group, Cliff Richard, Hank Marvin, Bruce Welch, Brian Bennett, Tony Meehan, Jet Harris, Brian 'Licorice' Locking, Vince Eager, Terry Dene, Wee Willie Harris, Adam Faith, Carlo Little, Joe Brown, Clem Cattini (The Tornados), Eden Kane, Screaming Lord Sutch, Tony Sheridan, Keith Kelly, Russ Sainty, Lance Fortune, Albert Lee, Johnny Kidd, Paul Gadd (later to be known as Paul Raven and then Gary Glitter), Ritchie Blackmore, Alex Wharton, Mickie Most (as the Most Brothers), Big Jim Sullivan, Joe Moretti, Vince Taylor, Duffy Power, Johnny Gentle, Michael Cox, Kris Kristofferson, Derry and the Seniors and Georgie Fame. Notable non-musical names among the 2i's clientele included Diana Dors, Michael Caine, Terence Stamp and Francis Bacon.

=== Famous personnel ===
According to an article in Time, skiffle was new to the UK, and the 2i's Coffee Bar and, nearby venue, The Cat's Whisker, founded by Peter Evans, were where "Soho hipsters swelter and suffocate for it... and... generally the musicians were paid with coffee and cokes". Evans later started the Angus Steak Houses from the bar.

Songwriter Lionel Bart and music producer Mickie Most worked there as waiters, whilst Wee Willie Harris worked as a cleaner and waiter and musician and future member of The Shadows Jet Harris worked behind the bar. According to Chas McDevitt, Bart was responsible for painting the cellar, decorating it with a "black ceiling, large, stylised eyes on the walls, and cubist shapes behind the small stage platform". Bruce Welch has stated that parts of Bart's artwork were retrieved by himself and Bart when they were removed during building work in the 1990s. Led Zeppelin's manager, Peter Grant, was a bouncer at the 2i's prior to his career in the music business.

The 2i's rapid success led to the opening of a second branch at 44 Gerrard Street, in what had been a folk and skiffle club run by John Hasted, before the end of 1956, although it soon closed due to intimidation by organised crime. The 2i's closed in 1970. It later became the Dome Café Bar and then the Boulevard Bar. The site then became The House of Ho, a modern Vietnamese restaurant owned by chef Bobby Chinn. From July 2016 the site has been the Soho Poppies Fish & Chips restaurant.

== Legacy ==
The 2i's was the inspiration for the establishment of the Casbah Coffee Club in Liverpool by Mona Best in the cellar of her family home, which played an important role in the early development of the Beatles. In 1960, Bruno Koschmider, manager of the Kaiserkeller club in Hamburg, visited the 2i's to recruit British rock'n'roll musicians to play at his venue: these included Derry and the Seniors, whose manager Allan Williams was also the Beatles' first manager, and who also arranged for the latter band to play in Hamburg for Koschmider. During their time in Hamburg the band worked with Tony Sheridan, who had performed at the 2i's, and later recruited another 2i's veteran, Jimmie Nicol, to fill in for Ringo Starr on an Australian tour.

On 18 September 2006, a green plaque was unveiled at the site of the 2i's Coffee Bar to commemorate its existence, and to celebrate 50 years of British rock and roll.

The coffee bar was immortalised in Wee Willie Harris' song "Rockin’ At The 2i’s", and by Tommy Steele in "Two Eyes", a song recorded for the soundtrack of the film The Tommy Steele Story. The film also featured a recreation of the coffee bar, albeit much more spacious than in real life, and also featured Tom Littlewood playing a judo instructor. During the 1980s The Stargazers became the last band to play in the 2i's basement when they filmed a music video there directed by Julien Temple, who also recreated the 2i's for the opening scene of his film Absolute Beginners.

Marc Bolan later reported that as a youth he had regularly attended the bar (in close proximity to his mother's Berwick Street market stall) and had once witnessed an unsuccessful audition by Richard at the venue.

Ringo Starr mentions "the 2i's Cafe", "That's where Tommy Steele would play", in the song "Rory and the Hurricanes" on his 2015 album Postcards from Paradise.

Michael Peppiatt mentions the café in his memoir of Francis Bacon: "As a teenager I'd gone on a rite of passage to the 2i's café to listen to skiffle groups, sipping frothy coffee out of transparent cups and hanging around in the hope of spotting Tommy Steele."

== Resident groups ==
- The Vipers Skiffle Group (July–September 1956)
- Tommy Steele (July–September 1956)
- The Soho Skiffle Group (late 1956)
- Les Hobeaux Skiffle Group (summer – late 1957)
- Terry Dene & The Dene Aces (late 1957 – early 1959)
- The Worried Men (late 1957 – early 1959)
- Colin Hicks & The Cabin Boys (early 1958 – early 1959)
- The Vagabonds (early – April 1958)
- Cliff Richard & The Drifters (early – summer 1958)
- Wally Whyton & The Vipers (May 1958 – early 1959)
- Vince Eager (summer 1958)
- Vince Taylor & the Playboys (early 1959 – summer 1960)
- The Jury (1961 – summer 1962)
