= Mal Evans =

English road manager (1935–1976)

- Evans in January 1969 during the filming of the Beatles' Get Back sessions
- Born: Malcolm Frederick Evans; 27 May 1935; Liverpool, England
- Died: 4 January 1976 (aged 40); Los Angeles, California, US
- Cause of death: Shooting
- Occupations: Telephone engineer; road manager; personal assistant; record producer
- Years active: 1962−1975
- Known for: The Beatles' assistant and road manager
- Spouse: Lily Evans (sep. 1973)
- Children: 2

Malcolm Frederick Evans (27 May 1935 – 4 January 1976) was an English road manager and personal assistant employed by the Beatles from 1963 until their break-up in 1970.

In the early 1960s, Evans was employed as a telephone engineer, and he also worked part-time as a bouncer at the Cavern Club. The Beatles' manager, Brian Epstein, later hired Evans as the group's assistant roadie, in tandem with Neil Aspinall. Over time, Evans became a constant companion to the group, being present on all of their tours, and after the Beatles stopped touring in 1966, at nearly all of their recording sessions. As a constant presence, the Beatles occasionally used Evans as an extra musician; he has (often uncredited) contributions on most Beatles albums from Rubber Soul (1965) onwards. During the final years of the group, and continuing after their break-up in 1970, Evans worked as a record producer and continued to work with the individual Beatles on their solo projects. As a producer, his biggest hit was with Badfinger's top 10 hit "No Matter What".

In 1976, at the age of 40, Evans was shot and killed by police at his home in Los Angeles, when he threatened officers with what turned out to be an air rifle. A decade after his death, his collection of diaries, notebooks and other handwritten documents was discovered, many of which provided key insights into Beatles recording sessions and internal band dynamics, though the disposition of these writings has been a source of some legal controversy in the intervening decades.

== Early life ==
Malcolm Frederick Evans was born in Liverpool to Frederick and Joan Evans and grew up in Waldgrave Road, Wavertree, Liverpool, along with his three sisters Pam, June and Barbara. He could also play the banjo.

What is known about him starts in 1961, when Evans married a Liverpool girl, Lily, after meeting her at a funfair in New Brighton opposite Liverpool on the Wirral. Their first child, Gary, was born in the same year. Their daughter, Julie, was born five years later in 1966.

The Beatles were the resident group at Liverpool's Cavern Club when Evans first heard them perform during his lunch break. He was then living in Hillside Road, Allerton and working as a telephone engineer for the Post Office. He became a committed fan, even though his musical hero at the time was Elvis Presley.

He first befriended George Harrison, who put forward Evans' name to the Cavern Club's manager, Ray McFall, when he needed a doorman. The 27-year-old Evans was accepted, even though he wore thick-framed glasses, but mainly because of his burly 6 ft 6 in (1.98 m) frame, which was an asset when holding back unruly fans at the Cavern's door. He was later nicknamed the "Gentle Giant" and "Big Mal". In 1962, Evans wrote that it was "a wonderful year", as he had Lily (his wife), his son Gary, a house, a car, and he was working at the Cavern Club, which he wrote into a 1963 Post Office Engineering Union diary, which also had information concerning Ohm's law and Post Office pay rates.

== The Beatles ==
Neil Aspinall and Evans in 1963

On 11 August 1963, Evans began working for the Beatles in the combined role of roadie/bodyguard. Evans and Aspinall's duties were to drive the van while on tour, and to set up and test the equipment. Evans' telephone engineering experience was valuable in setting up and maintaining the electrical equipment. The Beatles were being driven back to Liverpool from London by Evans through heavy fog on 21 January 1963, when the windscreen was hit by a pebble and glazed over; Evans had to break a large hole in it to see the road ahead. This was in winter, so the group had to lie one on top of the other in the back with a bottle of whisky and try to stay warm in the freezing temperatures, something Paul McCartney later referred to as a "Beatle sandwich".

Evans had many other duties as well as acting as a bodyguard; he was sent to buy anything they needed, such as clothing, meals, or drinks. If John Lennon said "Socks, Mal", Evans would have to rush to a local store and buy pairs of cotton socks for him. In 1967, Evans wrote in his diaries that he "bought Ringo [Starr] some undies for his visit to the doctor". Although Beatles' memorabilia are in continuous demand, a full set of autographs by all four could be forgeries: Evans and Aspinall used to sign many of them when Lennon, McCartney, Harrison and Starr were too busy.

The Beatles started their first European tour in January 1964, and Evans was allowed to take his wife and son with him, but was involved in a "big punch-up" with photographers in Paris while protecting them. Epstein's associate, Alistair Taylor, once asked him why he was driving an Austin Princess limousine, rather than a Daimler, a Bentley, or a Rolls-Royce. Evans explained that the Beatles were forced to choose an Austin, because they had tested every car to see how wide the doors would open as they had to "dive into the car" to escape their fans.

=== United States and the Philippines ===
The Beatles, and Evans, were introduced to cannabis by Bob Dylan in New York City in 1964. McCartney and Evans, both high for the first time, frantically searched until they found a pencil and paper so McCartney could write down his cannabis-influenced thoughts about life. He entrusted the writing to Evans, only to discover the next morning that he had only written, with no further explanation, "There are seven levels!" He later guessed it was rooted in a general concept shared by some world religions although he admitted he would not have known anything about them at that point. The Beatles attended "The Night of 100 Stars" at the London Palladium on 23 July 1964, and during the show Evans constantly supplied them with whisky and Coca-Cola, which he delivered to them balanced on a wooden oar he had found backstage.

The Beatles were always assisted by Evans on their American tours, and when they played two shows at the Hollywood Bowl in the summer of 1965 Epstein arranged for them all to have a four-day rest in a luxurious horseshoe-shaped house on stilts in Benedict Canyon off Mulholland Drive in Los Angeles. They spent their time there smoking cannabis joints. Evans and Lennon swam in the large outdoor swimming pool with cigarettes in their mouths, to see who could keep them alight the longest. After recording sessions in London, Lennon, Harrison, and Starr would be chauffeured back to their houses in the "stockbroker belt" of southern England, but Evans, Aspinall, and McCartney would drive to a late-night club to eat steak, chips, and mushy peas. The Bag O'Nails nightclub was one of their favourites, at 8 Kingly Street in Soho, London, as it also presented live music. In his memoirs Evans wrote: 19 January and 20: "Ended up smashed in Bag O'Nails with Paul [McCartney] and Neil [Aspinall]. Quite a number of people attached themselves, oh that it would happen to me... freak out time baby for Mal."

In July 1966, the Beatles toured the Philippines, and unintentionally snubbed the nation's first lady, Imelda Marcos. After the supposed snub was broadcast on Philippine television and radio, all of the Beatles' police protection disappeared. The group and their entourage had to make their way to Manila airport on their own. At the airport, Evans was beaten and kicked, and the group members were pushed and jostled about by a hostile crowd. Once the group boarded the plane, Tony Barrow and Evans were ordered off, and Evans said, "Tell Lil I love her", thinking he was about to be jailed or killed. Epstein was forced to give back all the money that the group had earned while they were there before being allowed on the plane.

=== Kenya and Sgt. Pepper ===
The Beatles' last concert was at Candlestick Park, San Francisco, on 29 August 1966, but Evans continued to work for them in the studio, and to run errands. After returning to London following their last American tour, McCartney went by himself on holiday to France, but asked to meet Evans in Bordeaux, at the Grosse Cloche church (on the corner of cours Victor Hugo and rue St. James). At exactly the pre-arranged time of one o'clock, Evans was standing under the church clock when McCartney arrived. They then drove to Madrid together but, after feeling bored, McCartney phoned Epstein's office in London and asked to be booked on a safari holiday in Kenya. When they arrived they visited the Amboseli Reserve at the foot of Mount Kilimanjaro, and also stayed at the exclusive Treetops Hotel, where the rooms are built on the branches of trees.

They spent their final night in Nairobi at a YMCA, before they returned to London. The Beatles—according to McCartney—needed a new name, so on the flight back to England, Evans and McCartney played with words to see if they could come up with something new. Evans innocently asked McCartney what the letters "S" and "P" stood for on the pots on their meal trays, and McCartney explained that it was for salt and pepper, which led to the Sgt. Pepper's Lonely Hearts Club Band name. They arrived back in London on 19 November 1966. Before the cover of Sgt. Pepper could be completed by Peter Blake, Evans and Aspinall were sent out to find photographs of all of the people that were to be shown on the front cover.

Evans and McCartney at Heathrow airport in 1966, after their African trip

In the spring of 1967—after the album was completed—Evans flew with McCartney to Los Angeles to see McCartney's then-girlfriend, Jane Asher, who was acting there with the Old Vic theatre company. The three of them went on a trip to the Rockies, returning to LA in Frank Sinatra's jet. Evans: "We left Denver in Frank Sinatra's Lear Jet, which he very kindly loaned us. A beautiful job with dark black leather upholstery and, to our delight, a well-stocked bar." When they were back in LA, they were invited to visit the house of Michelle and John Phillips, from the Mamas & the Papas. Brian Wilson was also there, as he was working on the Beach Boys' Smile album. Evans wrote about singing "On Top of Old Smokey" with McCartney and Wilson, but was not impressed by Wilson's avant-garde attitude to music: "Brian [Wilson] then put a damper on the spontaneity of the whole affair by walking in with a tray of water-filled glasses, trying to arrange it into some sort of session."

=== Greece and the Magical Mystery Tour ===
The Beatles and Evans flew to Greece in late 1967, with encouragement from Greek-born "Magic Alex", the director of Apple Electronics, to buy an island or a group of islands. The general idea was that the Beatles would live on the islands in their own separate homes, but would be connected to each other by tunnels leading to a central dome. Evans and his family were included in the plan, but it was abandoned as being unworkable after McCartney refused to participate. As McCartney had no housekeeper in 1967, Evans moved in with him at 7 Cavendish Avenue, St John's Wood, which is near Abbey Road Studios. It was at Cavendish Avenue that McCartney bought his first Old English Sheepdog, Martha, although Evans often complained about the dog fouling the beds. Evans later bought a house in Sunbury-on-Thames, which was situated between McCartney's, Lennon's, Harrison's and Starr's houses.

While working on the Magical Mystery Tour film, Evans wrote about his work duties: "I would get requests from the four of them to do six different things at one time, and it was always a case of relying on instinct and experience in awarding priorities. They used to be right sods for the first few days, until they realised that everything was going to go smoothly and they could get into the routine of recording. ... Then I would find time between numerous cups of tea and salad sandwiches and baked beans on toast to listen to the recording in the control room."

After the Magical Mystery Tour recordings, Evans flew to Nice with McCartney to shoot "The Fool on the Hill" promotional film, although McCartney set off without luggage or a passport. McCartney got past customs by saying "You know who I am", but he and Evans were not allowed into a hotel restaurant in Nice because they "didn't look the part", and had to eat dinner in Evans' room. Because the money they had with them had been spent on clothes (NEMS was supposed to send them more), they arranged for credit over two nights in a nightclub. Evans: "We took advantage of our credit standing, as money had still not arrived from England. News about Paul's [McCartney] visit to the club the previous night had spread, and the place was jammed. Now Paul, being a generous sort of person, had built up quite a bar bill, when the manager of the club arrived demanding that we pay immediately. On explaining who Paul was and what had happened, he answered, 'You either pay the bill, or I call the police.' It certainly looked like we were going to get thrown in jail. It was ironical, sitting in a club with a millionaire, unable to pay the bill."

=== India and Apple ===
The Beatles flew to India in February 1968, to visit the Maharishi Mahesh Yogi's ashram (after first meeting him on 24 August 1967, at the London Hilton hotel). Evans arrived in India a few days earlier to inspect the ashram, but as soon as Starr got off the plane, he demanded that Evans find a doctor, as his inoculation shots were causing him pain. Evans: "When we arrived at the local hospital, I tried to get immediate treatment for him [Starr], to be told curtly by the Indian doctor, 'He is not a special case and will have to wait his turn.' So off we go to pay a private doctor ten rupees for the privilege of hearing him say 'It will be all right'." Evans wrote in his diary on 17 February 1968: "The press really tried kicking down the gates into the Ashram, the Indian people on the Ashram called me half way through, but as soon as an Indian reporter told me "No bloody foreigner is going to stop me in my own country", I cooled it." Evans' diary says that he enjoyed his time in India: "It's hard to believe that a week has already passed. I suppose the peace of mind and the serenity one achieves through meditation makes the time fly," and that he also enjoyed the food, unlike Starr, who had brought a suitcase full of baked beans with him. After leaving India, Harrison and Evans flew to New York, visiting Bob Dylan and The Band, who were rehearsing at their Big Pink house/studio, in Woodstock.

When Apple was formed in 1968, Evans was promoted from road manager to personal assistant, although his weekly £38 salary remained the same.

After Evans and Peter Asher (A&R head of Apple Records) saw the rock band the Iveys perform at London's Marquee Club, Evans constantly suggested that the Beatles sign the band to the Apple label. This eventually happened in July 1968, when the Iveys became the first band to be signed to the label. Some of the first Apple recording sessions were produced by Evans and the band eventually changed their name to Badfinger. Evans:

January 13, 1969: Paul [McCartney] is really cutting down on the Apple staff members. I was elevated to office boy [Evans was made Managing Director of Apple, but very briefly] and I feel very hurt and sad inside—only big boys don't cry. Why I should feel hurt and reason for writing this is ego. ... I thought I was different from other people in my relationship with the Beatles and being loved by them and treated so nice, I felt like one of the family. Seems I fetch and carry. I find it difficult to live on the £38 I take home each week and would love to be like their other friends who buy fantastic homes and have all the alterations done by them, and are still going to ask for a rise. I always tell myself—look, everybody wants to take from, be satisfied, try to give and you will receive. After all this time I have about £70 to my name, but was content and happy. Loving them as I do, nothing is too much trouble, because I want to serve them. Feel a bit better now—EGO?

Evans' financial problems started to become such a problem that he had to ask Harrison for money: "April 24: "Had to tell George [Harrison]—'I'm broke'. Really miserable and down because I'm in the red, and the bills are coming in, poor old Lil [his wife] suffers as I don't want to get a rise. Not really true don't want to ask for a rise, fellows are having a pretty tough time as it is."

Evans was the only member of the Apple entourage to be invited to attend (and be a witness) when McCartney and Linda Eastman were married at Marylebone Registry Office on 12 March 1969. Evans wrote in his diary that he was due to be there at 9.45 am, but McCartney's brother, Michael's train from Birmingham was late. Peter Brown and Evans passed the register office at 9.15, and saw that there were only a few photographers and ardent fans standing in the rain, but when they left, after the wedding at 11.30 am, they were mobbed by a crowd of about 1,000 people. When the Beatles played on the roof of Apple's offices in Savile Row, Evans was told to delay the policemen (who had arrived to stop the concert), as long as was possible.

=== Allen Klein ===
Evans (with hand on hip, behind Ringo Starr) on the Apple Records rooftop during filming for Let It Be

Evans enjoyed an executive position at Apple until 1969, when Allen Klein was hired as a manager to reorganise the whole company. Evans was fired by Klein the next year, because Klein complained to Lennon that Aspinall and Evans were "living like kings; like fucking emperors". Evans was later reinstated after McCartney, Harrison and Starr complained. On 13 September 1969, Evans accompanied Lennon, Yoko Ono, Klaus Voormann, Alan White and Eric Clapton to Toronto, Ontario, Canada, for the Toronto Rock and Roll Revival concert. He later wrote: "I was really enjoying myself. It was the first show I had roadied for three years and I was really loving every minute of plugging the amps in and setting them up on stage, making sure that everything was right. Everyone wanted the show to go particularly well because Allen Klein, who had flown over, had organised for the whole of John's performance to be filmed. This was on top of it being video-taped by Dan Richter."

=== Musical contributions ===
Evans contributed to many recordings, including singing in the chorus of "Yellow Submarine". He played single organ notes on "You Won't See Me" and harmonica on "Being for the Benefit of Mr. Kite!" Regarding Evans' organ contribution on "You Won't See Me", McCartney explained that he showed Evans where the notes were on the organ, and then nodded his head when he wanted Evans to play, and shook it when he wanted him to stop.

On "A Day in the Life", Evans controlled an alarm clock; counting the measures in the original 24-bar pause, and was one of the five piano players simultaneously hitting the last chord of the song. He played tambourine on "Dear Prudence", and trumpet on "Helter Skelter", where he played a double solo with Lennon, even though neither was proficient on the instrument. Evans contributed background vocals, and stirred a bucket of gravel (as part of the rhythm), on "You Know My Name (Look Up The Number)". He also contributed to the White Album out-take "What's the New Mary Jane", and hit an anvil on "Maxwell's Silver Hammer", because Starr could not lift the hammer high enough to get the right sound and keep in time with the song.

According to Evans' diaries, he helped to compose songs for the Sgt. Pepper album. He wrote, on 27 January 1967: "Sgt Pepper. Started writing song with Paul [McCartney] upstairs in his room, he on piano" and "Did a lot more of "where the rain comes in" [a lyric from "Fixing a Hole"]. Hope people like it. Started Sergeant Pepper". On 1 February: "Sergeant Pepper sounds good. Paul tells me that I will get royalties on the song—great news, now perhaps a new home." On 2 February: "Recording voices on Captain [sic] Pepper. All six of us doing the chorus in the middle, worked until about midnight."

Keith Badman—author of The Beatles off the Record—referred to a tape recording of Evans speaking shortly before his death, on which Evans reiterated some of the statements made in the diary. According to Badman, Evans was asked at the time if it would be a problem that he was not credited as a writer, because the Lennon–McCartney writing name was "a really hot item". For reasons unclear, Evans did not receive any royalties and stayed at his £38-a-week pay (£605 in modern currency).

=== On film ===
Evans appeared in four (out of five) Beatles' films. During the filming of the Beatles' first feature film, A Hard Day's Night, Evans appeared in a cameo role, carrying an upright bass in between John Lennon and Millie in the backstage scene in which Millie (played by Anna Quayle) mistakes Lennon for someone else. In Help!, Evans played a confused channel swimmer who pops up through an ice-hole in Austria, and on a beach in the Bahamas. Evans and Aspinall were asked to find and hire the actors that were needed to perform in the Magical Mystery Tour film, and to hire an old 60-seater coach, on which they were told to paint the Magical Mystery Tour logo, which McCartney had designed. Evans later appeared in the film as one of the magicians, who cast mysterious spells on the passengers of the bus.

In the Let It Be film, Evans can be seen playing the anvil during early versions of "Maxwell's Silver Hammer", and can be seen talking to police officers on the Savile Row rooftop when they came to stop the performance. Before the concert, Evans placed a camera and a microphone in a corner of Apple's reception area, so that when the police came in to complain about the noise—which was expected—they could be filmed and recorded. McCartney then saved Evans from police arrest. The Beatles were often filmed by Evans during his time with them (without sound), and a collection of his own film recordings was later released on DVD.

== After the Beatles ==
In 1968, Evans had seen the group Badfinger (then known as The Iveys) play live, and suggested that they be signed to Apple. Evans then produced several of their songs in 1969 and 1970, the most notable of which was "No Matter What", which charted on Billboard's Top 10 in December 1970. Evans also discovered the group Splinter and brought them to the Apple label, although they would subsequently move to George Harrison's Dark Horse Records. Evans' other production credits include Jackie Lomax's 1969 single "New Day" (on Apple) and some of the tracks on Keith Moon's only solo album Two Sides of the Moon (1975).

Evans performed chimes, handclaps, and backing vocals on John Lennon's first post-Beatles single, "Instant Karma!" (1970). Evans separated from his wife in 1973 and moved to Los Angeles where Lennon had moved to live with May Pang after his own separation from Yoko Ono. Evans is credited on Harrison's All Things Must Pass and the John Lennon/Plastic Ono Band album as providing "tea and sympathy". Evans cowrote "You and Me (Babe)" with Harrison. The track appeared on Starr's 1973 solo album Ringo. He also cowrote the Splinter song "Lonely Man", the musical centrepiece of Little Malcolm, an Apple feature film produced by Harrison. A rare interview appearance by Evans was included in the 1975 ABC television special David Frost Salutes the Beatles.

Evans was asked to produce the group Natural Gas, and was working on a book of memoirs called Living the Beatles' Legend which he was due to deliver to his publishers, Grosset & Dunlap, on 12 January 1976. Evans was depressed about the separation from his wife (who had asked for a divorce before Christmas) even though he was then living with his new girlfriend, Fran Hughes, in a rented motel apartment at 8122 West 4th Street in Los Angeles.

== Death ==
On 4 January 1976, Evans was so despondent that Hughes phoned John Hoernie, Evans' co-writer for his biography, and asked him to visit them. Hoernie saw Evans "really doped-up and groggy" but Evans told Hoernie to make sure he finished Living the Beatles' Legend. Hoernie helped Evans up to an upstairs bedroom, but during an incoherent conversation, Evans picked up a loaded Winchester rifle. Hoernie struggled with Evans, but Evans, being much stronger, held onto the weapon.

Hughes then phoned the police and told them that Evans was confused, had a rifle, and was on Valium. Four police officers arrived and three of them, David D. Krempa, Robert E. Brannon and Lieutenant Charles Higbie, went up to the bedroom. They later reported that as soon as Evans saw the three police officers he pointed the rifle at them. The officers repeatedly told Evans to put down the weapon but Evans refused. The police fired six shots, four hitting Evans and killing him. Evans previously had been awarded the badge of "Honorary Sheriff of Los Angeles County", but in the Los Angeles Times he was referred to as a "jobless former road manager for the Beatles". Evans' biographer Kenneth Womack argued that the death was a suicide by cop, as Evans had written a will the night before.

Evans was cremated on 7 January 1976 in Los Angeles. None of the former Beatles attended his funeral, but Harry Nilsson, George Martin, Neil Aspinall and other friends did. George Harrison arranged for Evans' family to receive £5,000, as Evans had not maintained his life insurance premiums, and was not entitled to a pension.

== Legacy ==
In 1986, a trunk containing Evans' diaries and other effects was found in the basement of a New York publisher, and then sent to his family in London. In 1992, Lennon's original pages of lyrics to "A Day in the Life" were sold by the Evans estate for £56,600 at Sotheby's in London. In 2010, a double-sided sheet of paper containing the hand-written lyrics and notes to "A Day in the Life" were sold at auction at Sotheby's in New York to an anonymous American buyer for $1.2 million (£810,000). Other lyrics collected by Evans have been subject to legal action over the years: In 1996, McCartney went to the High Court in England to prevent the sale of the original lyrics to "With a Little Help from My Friends" that Evans' ex-wife had tried to sell, by claiming that the lyrics were collected by Evans as a part of his duties, and therefore belonged to the Beatles, collectively. A 2004 report of the discovery of a further collection of Evans' Beatles' memorabilia proved to be false.

A notebook in which McCartney wrote the lyrics for "Hey Jude" was sold in 1998, for £111,500. The notebook also contains lyrics for "Sgt. Pepper's Lonely Hearts Club Band" and "All You Need Is Love". It also contained lyrics, notes, drawings and poems by Lennon, McCartney, Harrison, and Starr, as well as by Evans.

In July 2012, a solo play about Evans by actor Nik Wood-Jones premiered at the Cavern in Liverpool before a run at the Edinburgh Fringe.

In December 2021, it was reported that a biography of Evans, written by Beatles scholar Kenneth Womack, was to be published by HarperCollins's Dey Street Books in 2023, to be followed the next year by material from Evans's diary and archives. The biography, entitled Living the Beatles Legend: The Untold Story of Mal Evans, was published on 14 November 2023.

Evans appears in the 2021 documentary series The Beatles: Get Back. The machine learning software and models developed by WingNut Films that were used to clean and isolate instruments and vocal tracks from single-track recordings for the documentary, and subsequently used for the 2022 release of Revolver and "Now and Then", was named MAL (machine-assisted learning) after Evans, and as an homage to HAL 9000.

Daniel Hoffmann-Gill will portray Evans in The Beatles – A Four-Film Cinematic Event, an upcoming film series of Beatles biopics directed by Sam Mendes.
