= The Clachan =

Pub in Soho, London

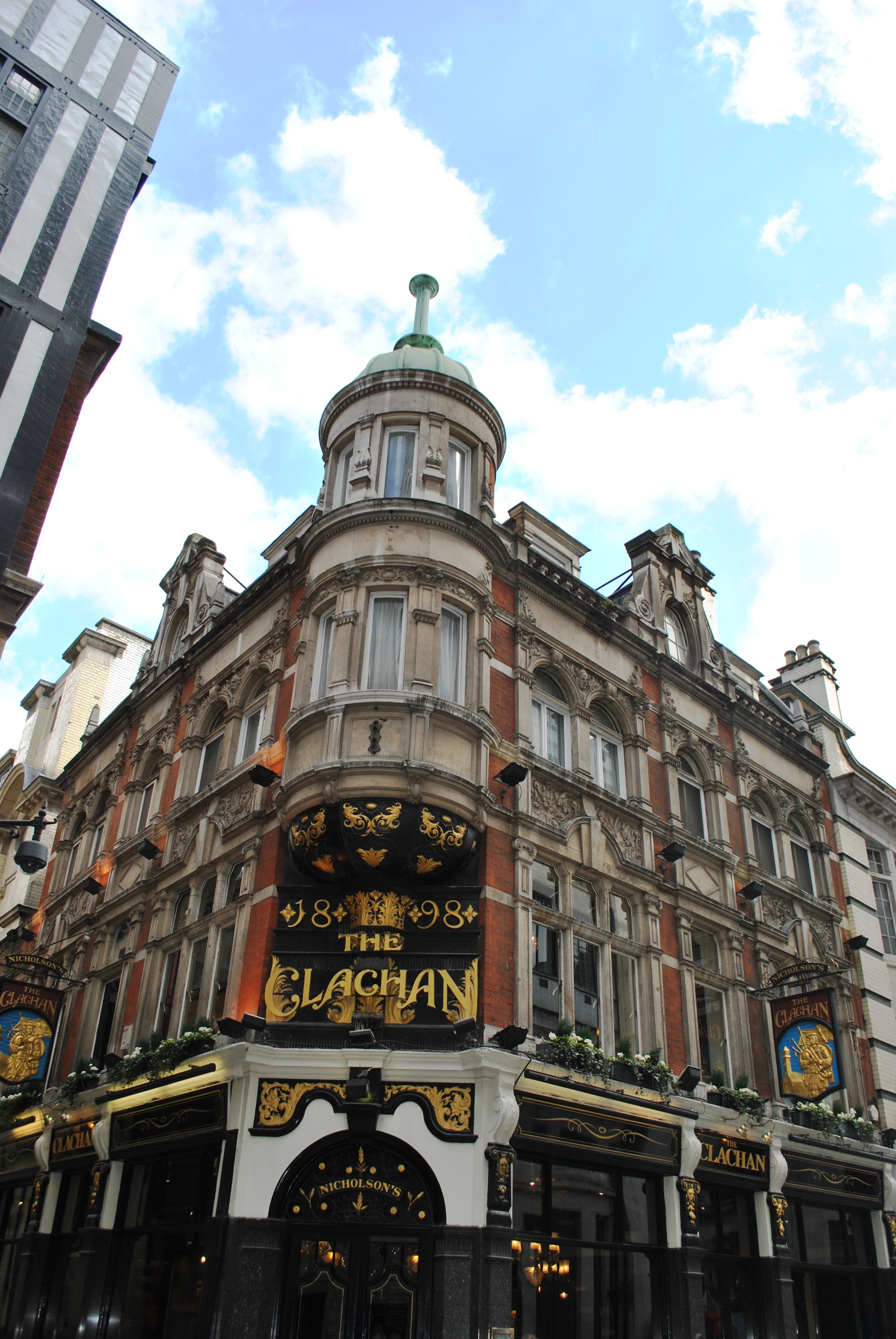
- The Clachan
- Location: 33 Kingly Street, London W1
- Coordinates: 51°30′48.72″N 0°8′24.87″W
- Built: 1898

Listed Building – Grade II
- Official name: THE CLACHAN PUBLIC HOUSE
- Designated: 08-Jul-2002
- Reference no.: 1061360

The Clachan is a public house at 33 Kingly Street, London W1.

It is a Grade II listed building, built in 1898, but the architect is not known.
