= Kenneth Womack =

American writer and journalist

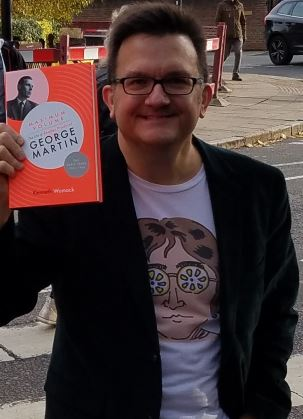
- Womack on Abbey Road, London in 2017
- Born: January 24, 1966 (age 60); Houston, Texas, U.S.
- Occupations: Author, music historian
- Notable work: Living the Beatles Legend
- Spouse: Jeanine Womack

Kenneth Womack (born January 24, 1966) is an American writer, literary critic, public speaker, and music historian, particularly focusing on the cultural influence of the Beatles. He is the author of the bestselling Solid State: The Story of Abbey Road and the End of the Beatles; John Lennon, 1980: The Last Days in the Life; and Living the Beatles Legend: The Untold Story of Mal Evans.

== Biography ==
Kenneth Womack was born in Houston, Texas, United States, and is Professor of English and Popular Music at Monmouth University.

Womack earned B.A. and M.A. degrees in English from Texas A&M University and a Ph.D. in English from Northern Illinois University. He lives in West Long Branch, New Jersey, with his wife Jeanine. Womack's brother Andrew is co-founder of the online magazine The Morning News.

He was named Penn State Laureate for the 2013–2014 academic year and received the Harold and Dorothy Seymour Medal from the Society for American Baseball Research in 2017. His writings have been honored by organizations such as the American Library Association and the Association for Recorded Sound Collections. In 2025, he was recognized with a Distinguished Alumni Award from the Humble Independent School District.

== Scholarly works ==
Womack's multiple books devoted to the Beatles include Reading the Beatles: Cultural Studies, Literary Criticism, and the Fab Four (2006; with Todd F. Davis), Long and Winding Roads: The Evolving Artistry of the Beatles (2007), The Cambridge Companion to the Beatles (2009), which was named by The Independent as the 2009 Music Book of the Year, and The Beatles Encyclopedia: Everything Fab Four (2014) and its revised paperback edition (2016).The Beatles Encyclopedia earned numerous awards as a scholarly reference work, while also enjoying acclaim from premier academic journals such as Choice and Popular Music and Society.

In 2017, Womack released the first volume in his full-length biography of Beatles producer Sir George Martin, Maximum Volume: The Life of Beatles Producer George Martin (The Early Years: 1926–1966), and the second volume, Sound Pictures: The Life of Beatles Producer George Martin (The Later Years: 1966–2016), in 2018. Womack is the Music Culture writer for Salon and also writes a regular column on the Beatles for CultureSonar entitled Everything Fab Four. In 2020, Rolling Stone highlighted Womack's scholarly efforts in shedding new light on the authorship and background of John Lennon's "Grow Old with Me". In October 2020, Womack was featured as a guest commentator on an episode of ABC's 20/20 entitled "John Lennon: His Life, Legacy, Last Days."

In addition, Womack is the author of the award-winning novel John Doe No. 2 and the Dreamland Motel (2010), which offers an alternative back-story for the Oklahoma City Bombing through the eyes of John Doe No. 2, the elusive mystery man who was originally identified by the FBI as a participant in the attack. In the novel, John Doe No. 2 spends more than a year in the company of Timothy McVeigh as he plots his calamitous act of domestic terrorism. John Doe No. 2 and the Dreamland Motel was the Bronze Award Winner in the ForeWord Reviews Book of the Year Award competition, as well as a Semi-Finalist for the James Branch Cabell First Novelist Award.

Womack's second novel, The Restaurant at the End of the World, provides a fictive re-creation of the last hours in the lives of the staff and visitors to the Windows on the World restaurant complex atop the North Tower of the World Trade Center. In 2013, The Restaurant at the End of the World earned the gold medal in the Independent Publisher Book Awards for Best Regional Fiction (Mid-Atlantic). The novel was also a finalist in the 2013 Indie Book Awards and the 2013 Montaigne Medal competition.

Womack's third novel, Playing the Angel, was published in August 2013, and his fourth novel, I Am Lemonade Lucy!, was published in May 2019. Kirkus Reviews lauded I Am Lemonade Lucy!, writing that "Womack has created a fun, fish-out-of-water tale with heavy implications about today’s world. He has carefully drawn, realistic small-town figures—thanks to sharp dialogue from Kip and Ry especially—to show how quickly open minds can close, building to an emotional and incensing conclusion." Womack's fifth novel, The Time Diaries, was published in 2021.

Womack's 2023 biography Living the Beatles Legend: The Untold Story of Mal Evans (HarperCollins) explores the life of Mal Evans, the Beatles’ longtime roadie and assistant. The book received widespread acclaim and was named one of the best music books of 2023 by publications including Rolling Stone, Variety, The Telegraph, Ultimate Classic Rock, People, and The Guardian. It also won Music Book of the Year at the 2024 Music Industry Cannes (MiCannes) conference.

== Literary criticism ==
As literary critic, Womack is the author and editor of several books related to ethical criticism and postmodern humanism, including Postwar Academic Fiction: Satire, Ethics, Community (2001), Mapping the Ethical Turn: A Reader in Ethics, Culture, and Literary Theory (2001; with Todd F. Davis), and Postmodern Humanism in Contemporary Literature and Culture: Reconciling the Void (2006; with Todd F. Davis). Womack's four-volume Books and Beyond: The Greenwood Encyclopedia of New American Reading (2008) was honored in 2009 by the American Library Association with the Outstanding Reference Sources Award.

In addition to serving as founding editor of Interdisciplinary Literary Studies: A Journal of Criticism and Theory, Womack is co-editor of the celebrated Year's Work in English Studies, published annually by Oxford University Press. His work as teacher and writer has earned numerous awards over the years, including Penn State University's Alumni Teaching Fellow Award (2006) and the Kjell Meling Award for Distinction in the Arts and Humanities (2010). In 2013, he was selected to serve as the sixth Penn State University Laureate.

== Selected bibliography ==
=== Fiction ===
- The Time Diaries (Lemont, PA: Mount Nittany Press, 2021).
- I Am Lemonade Lucy! (Castroville, TX: Black Rose, 2019).
- Playing the Angel (Nacogdoches, TX: Stephen F. Austin State University Press, 2013).
- The Restaurant at the End of the World (Charlotte, NC: Mint Hill Books, 2012).
- John Doe No. 2 and the Dreamland Motel (DeKalb, IL: Switchgrass Books/Northern Illinois University Press, 2010).

=== Scholarship ===
- With the Beatles: Mal Evans' Illustrated Journey (New York: HarperPop, 2026).
- The Beatles' Touring Era: Inside the Fab Four's Musical Artistry, Song by Song, 1962-1966 (London: Bloomsbury, 2026; co-authored with Scott Freiman).
- Starting Over with John and Yoko: The Photographs (New Brunswick, NJ: Rutgers University Press, 2026; co-authored with Roger Farrington).
- Narrative Concerns: Ethical Criticism in Literature, Music, and Film (Cambridge: Ethics International Press, 2025; co-authored with Todd F. Davis).
- Music Industry Strategies: Background and Resources (Dubuque, IA: Kendall Hunt, 2025; co-authored with Russ Crupnick and Joe Rapolla).
- Bruce Songs: The Music of Bruce Springsteen, Album-by-Album, Song-by-Song (New Brunswick, NJ: Rutgers University Press, 2024; co-authored with Kenneth L. Campbell).
- Living the Beatles Legend: The Untold Story of Mal Evans (New York: HarperCollins/Dey Street, 2023).
- Introducing the Beatles: Background and Resources (Dubuque, IA: Kendall Hunt, 2023; co-authored with Joe Rapolla).
- All Things Must Pass Away: Harrison, Clapton, and Other Assorted Love Songs (Chicago, IL: Chicago Review Press, 2021; co-authored with Jason Kruppa).
- Fandom and the Beatles: The Act You've Known for All These Years (Oxford: Oxford University Press, 2021; co-edited with Kit O'Toole).
- John Lennon 1980: The Last Days in the Life (London: Omnibus, 2020).
- The Beatles in Context (Cambridge: Cambridge University Press, 2020).
- Solid State: The Story of Abbey Road and the End of the Beatles (Ithaca, NY: Cornell University Press, 2019).
- Sound Pictures: The Life of Beatles Producer George Martin (The Later Years, 1966-2016) (Chicago, IL: Chicago Review Press, 2018).
- Maximum Volume: The Life of Beatles Producer George Martin (The Early Years, 1926-1966) (Chicago, IL: Chicago Review Press, 2017).
- The Beatles, Sgt. Pepper, and the Summer of Love (Lanham, MD: Lexington Books, 2017; co-edited with Kathryn B. Cox).
- World Trade Center Through Time (Portsmouth, NH: Arcadia, 2017).
- The Beatles Encyclopedia: Everything Fab Four (abridged; Santa Barbara, CA: Greenwood, 2016).
- Victorian Literary Cultures: Studies in Textual Subversion (Cranbury, NJ: Fairleigh Dickinson University Press, 2016; co-edited with James M. Decker).
- The Eighth Wonder of the World: The Life of Houston's Iconic Astrodome (Lincoln, NE: University of Nebraska Press, 2016; co-authored with Robert C. Trumpbour).
- New Critical Perspectives on the Beatles: Things We Said Today (New York: Palgrave, 2016; co-edited with Katie Kapurch).
- The Mammoth Book of Movies (DuBois, PA: Mammoth Books, 2015).
- The Beatles Encyclopedia: Everything Fab Four (two volumes; Santa Barbara, CA: Greenwood, 2014).
- Made to Order: The Sheetz Story (Portsmouth, NH: Arcadia, 2013).
- The Facts on File Companion to Shakespeare (five volumes; New York: Facts on File, 2012; co-edited with William Baker).
- Bruce Springsteen, Cultural Studies, and the Runaway American Dream (Aldershot: Ashgate, 2012; co-edited with Jerry Zolten and Mark Bernhard).
- The Cambridge Companion to the Beatles (Cambridge: Cambridge University Press, 2009).
- Penn State Altoona (Portsmouth, NH: Arcadia, 2009; co-authored with Lori J. Bechtel-Wherry).
- Books and Beyond: The Greenwood Encyclopedia of New American Reading (four volumes; Westport, CT: Greenwood, 2008).
- Long and Winding Roads: The Evolving Artistry of the Beatles (New York: Continuum, 2007).
- Postmodern Humanism in Contemporary Literature and Culture: Reconciling the Void (New York: Palgrave, 2006; co-authored with Todd F. Davis).
- Reading the Beatles: Cultural Studies, Literary Criticism, and the Fab Four (Albany: State University of New York Press, 2006; co-edited with Todd F. Davis).
- The Critical Response to John Irving (Westport, CT: Praeger, 2004; co-edited with Todd F. Davis).
- Reading the Family Dance: Family Systems Therapy and Literary Study (Newark: University of Delaware Press, 2003; co-edited with John V. Knapp).
- The Good Soldier: A Tale of Passion, by Ford Madox Ford (Peterborough, ON: Broadview Press, 2003; co-edited with William Baker).
- Formalist Criticism and Reader-Response Theory (New York: Palgrave, 2002; co-authored with Todd F. Davis).
- A Companion to the Victorian Novel (Westport, CT: Greenwood, 2002; co-edited with William Baker).
- Mapping the Ethical Turn: A Reader in Ethics, Culture, and Literary Theory (Charlottesville: University of Virginia Press, 2001; co-edited with Todd F. Davis).
- Postwar Academic Fiction: Satire, Ethics, Community (New York: Palgrave, 2001).
- Key Concepts in Literary Theory (Edinburgh: Edinburgh University Press, 2001; co-authored with Julian Wolfreys and Ruth Robbins).
- Twentieth-Century Bibliography and Textual Criticism: An Annotated Bibliography (Westport, CT: Greenwood, 2000; co-edited with William Baker).
- Felix Holt, The Radical, by George Eliot (Peterborough, ON: Broadview Press, 2000; co-edited with William Baker).
- British Book-Collectors and Bibliographers (three volumes; Detroit: Gale Research, 1997–1999; co-edited with William Baker).
- Recent Work in Critical Theory, 1989-1995: An Annotated Bibliography (Westport, CT: Greenwood, 1996; co-authored with William Baker).
