= Living the Beatles Legend =

2023 biography by Kenneth Womack

Living the Beatles Legend: The Untold Story of Mal Evans
- Author: Kenneth Womack
- Subject: Mal Evans
- Genre: Biography
- Publisher: HarperCollins
- Publication date: November 14, 2023
- Pages: 592
- ISBN: 0-063-24851-4

Living the Beatles Legend: The Untold Story of Mal Evans is a biography of the Beatles' road manager Mal Evans by Kenneth Womack. It was published on November 14, 2023, by HarperCollins.

== Background ==
Malcolm Frederick Evans (1935–1976) was employed as the road manager and personal assistant to the British rock band the Beatles from 1963 up until their break-up in 1970. By 1976, he had secured a publishing contract with G. P. Putnam's Sons for his memoir and had received approval to publish it from all four Beatles, but he died shortly before the manuscript was due. In 1988, a box was found in the publisher's basement containing the full manuscript for the memoir along with Evans' personal diaries, notebooks, and photos. In 2020, Evans' son Gary asked the Beatles researcher Kenneth Womack to write a biography of Evans. When Womack agreed, Gary sent him the full contents of the box. In addition to using its materials, Womack conducted over 200 interviews with people who had known Evans.

== Content ==
The book covers Evans' life from his childhood in Wales up until his death in 1976, which Womack argues was a suicide by cop. Womack describes Evans' encounters with the celebrities Marlene Dietrich, Burt Lancaster, and Keith Moon, the difficulties of protecting the Beatles during Beatlemania, and Evans' infidelity and neglect of his family. The book also contains scans of previously unseen photographs and diary pages, including the final known picture of John Lennon and Paul McCartney, taken in 1974 during their only post-Beatles recording session together.

== Reception ==
Alexandra Jacobs of The New York Times wrote that Womack told Evans' story "with rigor and care if not a sparkling prose style", and concluded that "[Evans] is here dusted off and given a proper salute". Tim Adams of The Guardian noted that as the book approaches the subject's death it "becomes a kind of cautionary tale". Dominic Green expressed a similar sentiment in The Wall Street Journal, also calling the book a "cautionary tale" and writing that "Evans loved Elvis, the movies and cowboy shootouts. Living the dream turned his life upside-down, then killed him."

== Sequel ==
In 2026, Womack announced With the Beatles: Mal Evans' Illustrated Journey, a companion book consisting of scans from Evans' archive.
