= Kingly Street =

Street in Soho, London

Coordinates: 51.5129°N 0.1397°W

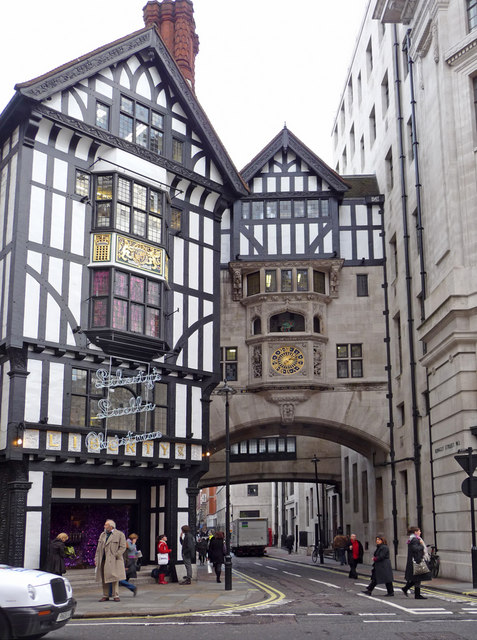
the Northernmost entrance to the Kingly Street mall.

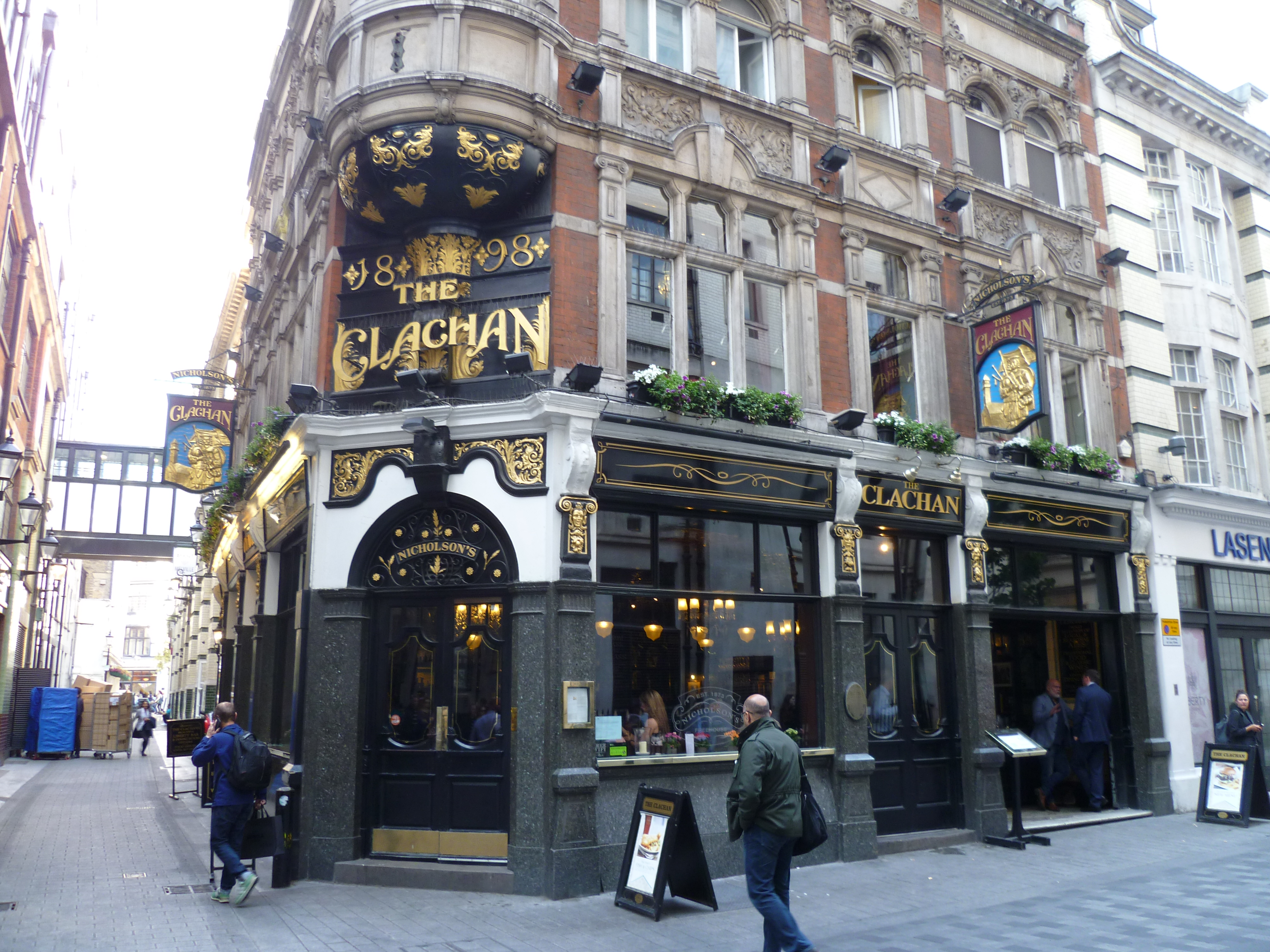
The Clachan, Kingly Street, 2015

Kingly Street is a street in London's Soho district. It runs north to south from Liberty's and Foubert's Place to Beak Street, in parallel to, and between, Regent Street and Carnaby Street.

Known as King Street until 1906, the first building - around a new road based on an existing foot-path from Piccadilly to St. Marylebone - started in the 1680s. In the 1720s there was much re-building. The buildings on the west side of the street - aside from parts of St. Thomas's Church, which survived into the 1950s - were all destroyed during the development of John Nash's Regent’s Street in the 1820s.

Numbers 7 to 11 and No 24 are survivors from the 1720s.

The Cat's Whisker, a coffee bar at No 1 during the mid-late 1950s, was supposedly the place where hand jiving was invented, as there was little space to maneuver for dancing in its crowded basement.

No 7 has been a barber for well over a century.

The Bag O'Nails at no 9, was a live music club and meeting place for musicians in the 1960s, where Paul McCartney met his future wife Linda Eastman in May 1967.

Tommy Roberts opened his first boutique, Kleptomania, at 10 Kingly Street in 1966.

The Tatty Bogle out-of-hours drinking club moved (from Frith Street) to the basement of No 11 at the end of World War 1. It was used as a bomb shelter in World War II, when the membership book included Guy Burgess, Donald Maclean, Anthony Blunt and Buster Crabbe.

The Red Lion at No 14 is on the site of a tavern dating from the 1720s, but is now largely Victorian in its design. Similarly, there has been a pub at No 18 since it was first licensed in 1728 as the Two Blue Posts. The pub was rebuilt in its present form in 1892.

The Nest Club, a jazz venue opened by American musician Ike Hatch, was at No 23 from 1934 until 1939. The Mills Brothers, Fats Waller and The Ink Spots performed there.

The Northern end runs under the three storey archway that is part of the building that houses the Liberty department store. The renowned Liberty Clock forms part of the masonry section of the archway and looks out over the Northern entrance of Kingly Street.

Kingly Court is behind it, a courtyard in the angle between Carnaby Street and Beak Street.
