= Peter Evans (restaurateur) =

British restaurateur and writer (1926–2014)

- Born: 28 December 1926; Highgate, London, England
- Died: 19 July 2014 (aged 87)
- Occupations: Restaurateur; Writer
- Years active: 1950s–2014
- Notable work: Founder of The Cat's Whisker, Peter Evans Eating Houses, Raffles nightclub
- Spouse: Gail Wintour

Peter Evans (28 December 1926 – 19 July 2014) was a British restaurateur and writer. He founded The Cat's Whisker, a coffee bar in Soho, London. Evans later established the Peter Evans Eating Houses, a restaurant chain recognised for its distinctive interior design.

Evans collaborated with interior designer David Hicks and architect Patrick Garnett of the firm Garnett Cloughley and Blakemore. Their work contributed to the decorative style associated with London's Swinging Sixties, creating dining and dancing venues that attracted a fashionable and affluent clientele. Cultural figures and style icons of the era, such as Twiggy, Mary Quant, and those associated with the Carnaby Street scene, were part of this vibrant period.

In 1967, Evans opened Raffles, a members-only nightclub on King's Road in Chelsea, featuring Hicks' original interior design, which remained until 2007. The club drew notable figures of the 1960s, including Princess Margaret, Princess Anne, and Prince Charles. In later years, younger royals, including Prince William during his courtship with Kate Middleton and Prince Harry with Chelsy Davy, also frequented the club.

== Biography ==
Peter Evans was born in Highgate, London. His father, Lionel Oliver Evans, was an inventor and builder.

After attending Belmont School in Mill Hill, Evans worked briefly in his father's business before moving to Ghana. In Ghana, he worked with the Daily Mirror's West African subsidiary, the Daily Graphic, as their African correspondent. He covered Wimbledon tennis events and developed a strong dedication to sport.

In the 1970s, he moved to Brisbane, Australia, and married his second wife, journalist Gail Wintour.

Evans' private life included many luxuries such as Bentley motor cars, Turnbull & Asser shirts, Lobb shoes, and Savile Row suits, along with high-stakes gambling and numerous romantic relationships.

Evans occasionally played at John Aspinall's Clermont Club. The club was the subject of cheating allegations made by Douglas Thompson in his book The Hustler and in Channel 4's documentary The Real Casino Royale. This alleged cheating led to a falling out with Aspinall, but Evans later forgave him because of Aspinall's passion for animals, asserting that humans, rather than animals, would be the ones to destroy the planet.

== Professional work ==
When he returned to London, he joined Roy Wallace-Dunlop, an avowed cigarette smuggler from Casablanca, and opened The Cat's Whisker, which became one of the first coffee bars in the area, featuring Spanish dancing and espresso.

After Wallace-Dunlop left the partnership, Evans partnered with Robin Eldridge. They first changed direction by installing a jukebox. Later, they also featured live music. The Cat's Whisker quickly became a popular destination for young people flocking to Soho to listen to Lonnie Donegan's skiffle music and Tommy Steele's rock 'n roll.

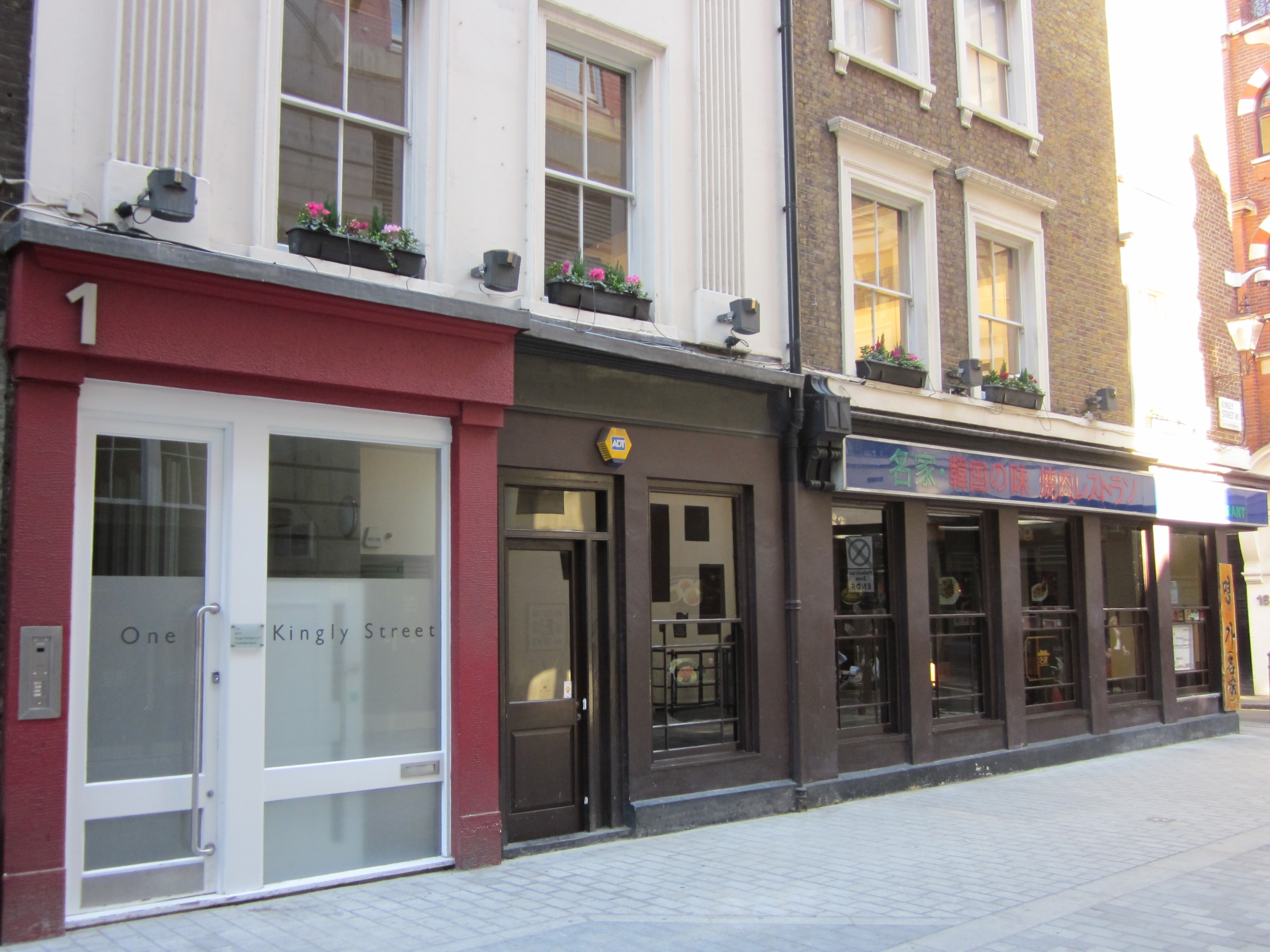
1 Kingly St in 2010

In 1958, the police shut down The Cat's Whisker due to dangerous overcrowding. Later, Peter Evans formed a partnership with accountant Tom Beale and butcher Reg Eastwood. They opened the first Angus Steak Houses at the previous location of The Cat's Whisker, 1 Kingly Street, Soho.

When the partnership with Beale and Eastwood dissolved, Evans opened Peter Evans Eating Houses (PEEH) in locations such as Fleet Street, Chelsea, and Kensington. Evans enlisted the designer David Hicks and the architectural firm Garnett, Cloughley, and Blakemore (GCB) to design the PEEH restaurants. In 1967, Hicks designed Raffles, one of Evans's most enduring restaurants.

Evans, Hicks, and Garnett together and separately influenced interior design style trends in the 1960s. The GCB portfolio included the revolving restaurant atop the Post Office Tower, the Chelsea Drug Store, a boutique on King's Road, and the George V Hotel in Paris. Hicks created the distinctive fork logo for the Peter Evans Eating Houses.

In 1964, Evans collaborated with illustrator Willie Rushton on The Anti-Bull Cook-Book, published in hardback by Anthony Blond. In 1967, a paperback edition titled The Stag Cook Book: A Low Guide to the High Art of Nosh was released by The New English Library - Four Square.

During his time in Brisbane, he wrote the magic-comedy television series "The Martin St James Show" for The Reg Grundy Organisation on the 10 Network and a 13-part radio program titled "Earthquake," showcasing modern music for the Australian Broadcasting Corporation.

While living in Sydney, Evans freelanced for The Australian and The Bulletin and became a regular contributor to Scope, a weekly radio program on ABC.

Evans later returned to the UK and founded a merchant bank named Montgomery Evans. In 1969, he sold his holdings in Peter Evans Eating Houses to his bank, Kleinwort Benson Lonsdale. He attempted to repurchase Peter Evans Eating Houses and Raffles from Benson Norman Lonsdale, but both businesses had already been sold to boxers Billy and George Walker. Evans experienced further difficulties with Benson Norman Lonsdale when he discovered the bank's representative was allegedly planning to take over his role as chairman of the board. In response, Evans decided to terminate the representative's employment.

Evans wrote a novel for the New English Library about population growth and indifference to global hunger entitled "Megadeath." In it, Evans predicted that methane from livestock would impact climate change.

Evans, David Frost and Bryan Forbes temporarily took ownership of Private Eye magazine to help the publication overcome financial difficulties. Evans's and Frost's multimillion-pound redevelopment project of a property on King's Road fell through when another participant, Robert Maxwell, withdrew due to financial problems.

== Political views ==
Evans became dissatisfied with the current political environment and developed a model of governance he believed would address pressing global challenges while safeguarding taxpayer funds from misuse. Within this model, Evans suggested permanently closing the Houses of Parliament, which he saw as expensive and redundant. He believed video-conferencing technology could eliminate the need for a physical Parliament and allow representatives to effectively serve the people without unnecessary expense.

== Bibliography ==
- Sandbrook, Dominic Never Had It So Good: 1956–63 v1 A History of Britain from Suez to the Beatles Abacus ISBN 978-0-349-11530-6. 5 May 2005
- Sandbrook, Dominic White Heat: A History of Britain in the Swinging Sixties Abacus ISBN 978-0-349-11820-8. 3 August 2006
- Newell, Malcolm Mood and Atmosphere in Restaurants 1965 Barrie and Rockliff (Barrie Books Ltd), London WC2
- Evans, Peter The Anti-Bull Cook-Book With drawings by William Rushton pub Anthony Blond 1964 (pre-ISBN)
- Evans, Peter The Stag Cook Book' A low guide to the high art of nosh With drawings by William Rushton pub New English Library A Four Square Book 1967
- Evans, Peter Megadeath pub New English Library 1976
- Barr, Ann and York, Peter The Official Sloane Ranger Handbook Ebury Press 1982 ISBN 0-85223-236-5
- Lewis, Julie Editor of Unlimited Scope Hargreen Publishing Company 1983 ISBN 0-949905-13-5
- Thompson, Douglas The Hustlers Pan Books 2008 ISBN 978-0-330-44951-9
- Evans, Peter (Zachariah) and G Theresa Wintour. Guide to Village Riches. Saturday Richmond, 1990. ISBN 1-872804-03-9
