= Hand jive =

Dance using only the hands

The hand jive is a dance particularly associated with music from the 1950s, rhythm and blues in particular. It involves a complicated pattern of hand moves and claps at various parts of the body. It resembles a highly elaborate version of pat-a-cake. Hand moves include thigh slapping, crossing the wrists, fist pounding, hand clapping, and hitchhike moves.

In 1957, when filmmaker Ken Russell was a freelance photographer, he recorded the teenagers of Soho, London, hand-jiving in the basement of The Cat's Whisker coffee bar, where the hand-jive had been invented by Leon Bell of Leon Bell and the Bell Cats. According to an article in the Daily Mirror, "it's so crowded [at The Cat's Whisker] the girls hand-jive to the band as there's no room for dancing." Russell told interviewer Leo Benedictus of The Guardian that "the place was crowded with young kids... the atmosphere was very jolly. Wholesome... everyone jiving with their hands because there was precious little room to do it with their feet... a bizarre sight. The craze fascinated me. It seemed like a strange novelty; I used to join in."

== Songs referring to "Hand Jive" ==
His Master's Voice licensed Capitol Records to release the song "Hand Jive 6-5" in the U.S., backed with "Ramshackle Daddy" (3937), by British group Don Lang and his "Frantic Five" in March 1958. This recording does not feature the Bo Diddley rhythm.

In April 1958, the UK record label Decca Records, released a song called "Hand Jive" by Bud Allen, performed by the Betty Smith Group. The song lyrics describe the hand dance the title refers to.

The hand jive was popularized in the United States by Johnny Otis's "Willie and the Hand Jive", described as a "funky blues rendition in a Bo Diddley styling" and "another approach to the growing Stateside interest in the British originated hand dance."

This song exhibited the Bo Diddley beat, a rhythm that originated in Afro-Latin music and was brought into mainstream American music by Bo Diddley. It has since influenced generations of musicians.

Jazz trumpeter Miles Davis has a track titled "Hand Jive," written by drummer Tony Williams, on the album Nefertiti from 1967.

=== Versions ===
Eric Clapton did a version of the Johnny Otis song in 1974 that reached the Top 40.

Additionally, "Willie and the Hand Jive" was played on several occasions by the New Riders of the Purple Sage featuring Jerry Garcia from the Grateful Dead.

George Thorogood and the Delaware Destroyers recorded a version of "Willie and the Hand Jive" and a music video.

== Other uses: in music ==
The hand jive is also featured prominently in the Broadway musical Grease (1971) through the song "Born to Hand Jive"; in the movie adaptation of the musical, the song is performed by Sha Na Na. On a DVD audio commentary for the movie, choreographer Patricia Birch mentions that the dance also went by the much more risque name "hand job", but the title was changed as Grease was aimed at a family audience.

The hand movements are also featured in John Waters' 1988 film Hairspray, as the special education class does this behind the teacher's back during the Pledge of Allegiance.

Jazz fusion guitarist John Scofield's 1993 album is called Hand Jive.

The long-running Walt Disney World musical Festival of the Lion King (1997) uses this during the song "Hakuna Matata," and the performers and audience do it while singing the song. The audience is taught the hand jive sometime before the show begins.

The 2005 album Midnight Boom by the band The Kills features the hand-jive rhythm in the song "Sour Cherry." The band's goal while writing the album was to write rhythms inspired by old-school schoolyard hand claps.

Contestants of the British version of Blockbusters, a television game show, would perform a hand-jive over the theme tune during the closing credits. It was started by a bored contestant awaiting his turn.

== See also ==
- Juba dance (hambone)
- Manualism (hand music)
- Bo Diddley beat
