= The Bag O'Nails =

Live music club and meeting place for musicians in Soho, London, England

- The Bag
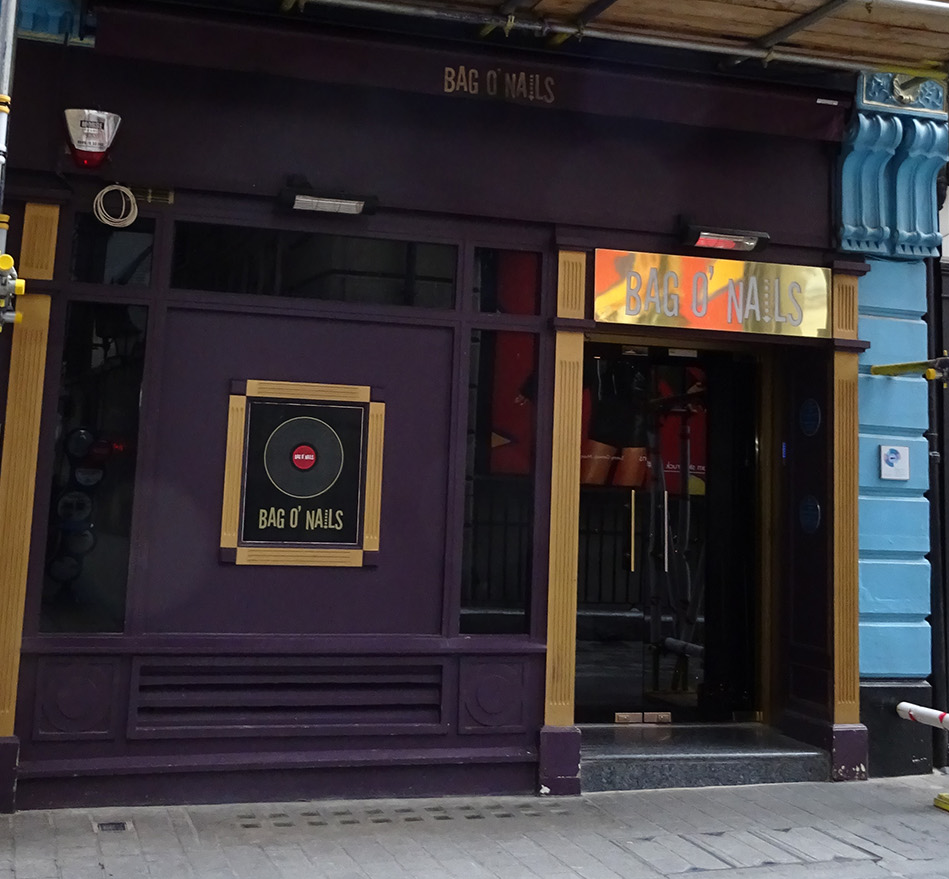
- The Bag O'Nails Club in its second incarnation as a private members' club, 2017
- Interactive map of The Bag O'Nails
- Address: Kingly Street; London, W1; United Kingdom
- Coordinates: 51.512361°N 0.13889°W
- Capacity: 100
- Type: Private members nightclub, live music venue
- Public transit: Oxford Circus; Piccadilly Circus

Construction
- Opened: 1965
- Closed: 1968 (re-opened 2013)

The Bag O'Nails was a live music club and meeting place for musicians in the 1960s and situated at 9 Kingly Street, Soho, London, England.

== History ==
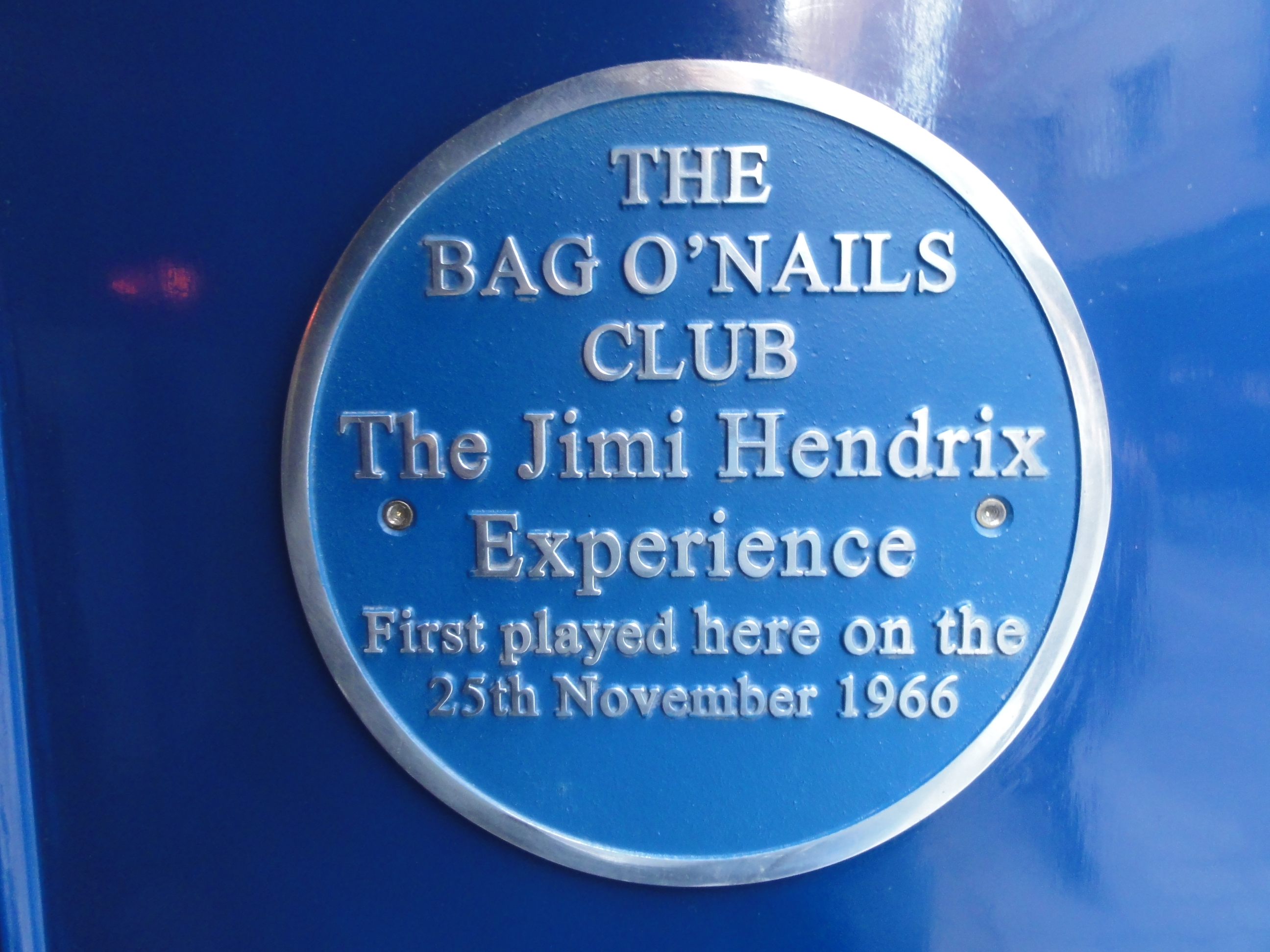
Doorway plaque commemorating Jimi Hendrix's performance at the venue

Bands and other musicians who played and socialised there included Georgie Fame, Jimi Hendrix, Bobby Tench, the Gass and Eric Burdon. The venue also hosted an early gig by the Jimi Hendrix Experience, and others who frequented the venue include Tom Jones, the Who and the Animals.

After the Beatles' recording sessions in London, their roadie Mal Evans, personal assistant Neil Aspinall and Paul McCartney would eat at The Bag O'Nails and it was one of their favourite venues. McCartney met his future wife Linda Eastman at the club on 15 May 1967; Justin Hayward of the Moody Blues met his future wife Ann Marie Guirron there as well. Another event is recorded in Mal Evans's memoirs: "January 19 and 20: I ended up drunk in The Bag O'Nails with McCartney and Aspinall". Mireille Strasser met Peter Noone (Herman's Hermits) at The Jimi Hendrix Experience in 1967. They married on 5 November 1968.

The Bag O'Nails re-opened as a private members' club in March 2013, before closing in 2018. It is now the site of a members' club called The Court.

== Bibliography ==
- Miles, Barry (1998). Many Years From Now. Vintage-Random House. ISBN 0-7493-8658-4.
- Spitz, Bob (2006). The Beatles: The Biography. Little, Brown and Company (New York). ISBN 1-84513-160-6.
- Roby, Steven (2010). Becoming Jimi Hendrix: From Southern Crossroads to Psychedelic London, The Untold Story of A Musical Genius. Da Capo Press. p. 178. ISBN 978-0-306-81910-0.
