= Angus Steakhouse =

British restaurant chain

- Industry: Restaurants
- Founded: London, England (1968)
- Headquarters: London, England, UK
- Number of locations: 3
- Area served: United Kingdom
- Products: Steak
- Website: angussteakhouse.co.uk

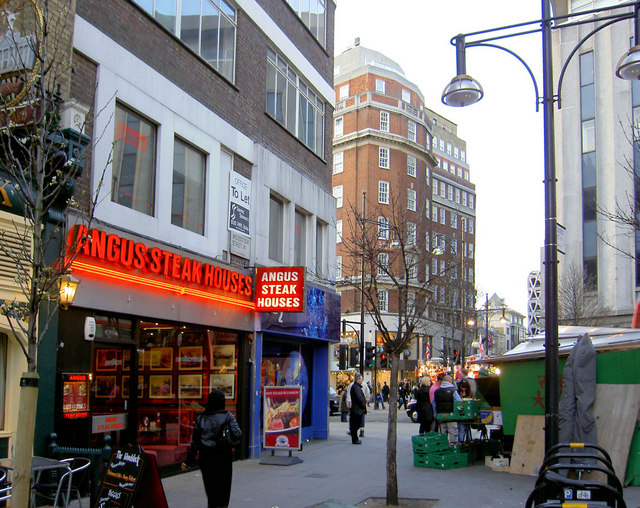
Angus Steakhouse

Angus Steakhouse is a restaurant chain of steak houses in central London. In 2001, there were about 30 outlets; 3 remain open as of July 2026. The name reflects Aberdeen Angus, a Scottish breed of beef cattle. As of September 2016 some restaurants still retained the former trading name, "Aberdeen Steak Houses", on their signage.

== History ==
Aberdeen Steak Houses was started in the early 1960s by Reginald Eastwood (born c. 1913), who had started in business aged 15 as an apprentice butcher. Eastwood's vision was for a more modern version of the earlier chop-house grills, and was influenced by American steak houses. The décor was opulent, with plate glass windows and red velour banquettes. Menus included trendy dishes like prawn cocktail and Black Forest gateau. The Good Food Guide of the 1960s listed the restaurants. Eastwood and partner Thomas Beale floated the company on 6 February 1964. In 1965, the Kaye brothers' Golden Egg cafeterias bought a 76% stake in the 14 Angus restaurants. In 1973 EMI Hotels won a bidding war against Ralston Purina to buy the Golden Egg group from the Kayes.

By the 1970s, the group was focused more on tourist trade, with many branches in the West End to attract those attending theatre or musical shows. Angus Steakhouses was a subsidiary of Aberdeen Steak Houses with the same business model. In the mid-1970s, the firm had an industrial dispute with the TGWU. In 1980 EMI sold 13 restaurants to Thistle Hotels.

In 1984, the group was sold to Ali Salih, a Turkish businessman with a low public profile. The menu and décor showed little update since the 1960s, and the brand got a reputation as tourist traps for foreigners. Business remained strong through the 1980s and at its peak it had an annual turnover of £20m with 700,000 steaks sold. Its 1989 profit was £330,000.

Its business, along with the wider UK beef industry, was hit in the 1990s by bovine spongiform encephalopathy, then by foot and mouth disease in 2001. It made a loss of £3m in 2000. In April 2001, Salih sold the sites of several branches for £4m. The decline in American tourists after the September 11 attacks was also cited by Salih after the group went into receivership in October 2002, with £7m in debt. At the time, it had 16 "Angus Steak House" outlets, six "Aberdeen Steak House", three "Pizza Pasta", two "Maxine's Brasserie", and one each of "American Burger", "American Café Bistro", and "Highland Steak House".

Administrators BDO and lawyers Berwin Leighton Paisner kept the firm trading as a going concern, though several of the sites were sold off to pay debts. In 2003, the remaining 21 outlets were bought by Noble Organisation, run by Michael and Philip Noble, whose core business was amusement arcades. In 2008, Noble told The Times they were "upgrading and refurbishing the restaurants".

== Reputation ==
In 2011, actor and comedian David Mitchell championed the cause of Aberdeen Angus Steak Houses in his opinion column in The Guardian, proposing that they be a nominee for a British World Heritage bid, citing them as being "unique to British culture" because of their "proud heritage of serving shoe leather with Béarnaise sauce to neon-addled out-of-towners."

== Locations ==
Angus Steakhouse now lists three restaurants in London: one on Cranbourn Street, in the West End; one at 10 Woodstock Street, just off Oxford Street; and one located opposite Paddington Station, at 163 Praed Street.
