= Joe Cocker discography =

Discography of English singer Joe Cocker

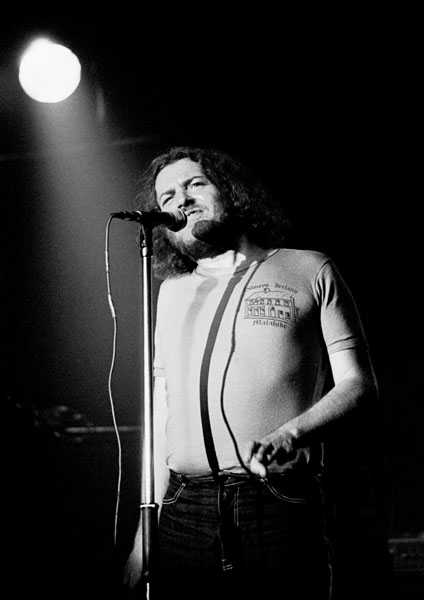
- Cocker performing; 16 October 1980 in the National Stadium, Dublin; Photo: Eddie Mallin
- Studio albums: 22
- Live albums: 9
- Compilation albums: 14
- Singles: 68
- Video albums: 17
- Music videos: 32

This Joe Cocker discography lists the recordings plus live appearances of John Robert "Joe" Cocker, OBE (20 May 1944 – 22 December 2014), the English rock and blues musician, composer and actor who came to popularity in the 1960s, and became known for his gritty voice, his idiosyncratic arm movements while performing, and his cover versions of popular songs, particularly those of the Beatles.

Cocker received several awards, including a 1983 Grammy Award for his recording of "Up Where We Belong", a duet he performed with the American singer-songwriter Jennifer Warnes. He was ranked No. 97 on Rolling Stone's 100 greatest singers list.

== Albums ==
=== Studio ===
Year	Title	Peak chart positions										Certifications (sales thresholds)
Year	Title	UK	AUS	CAN	FRA	GER	ITA	NDL	NZ	SWE	US	Certifications (sales thresholds)
1969	With a Little Help from My Friends	29	—	40	—	—	—	—	—	—	35	RIAA: Gold
1969	Joe Cocker!	29	—	10	—	—	—	—	—	—	11	RIAA: Gold
1972	Joe Cocker (a.k.a. Something to Say)	—	11	28	8	50	4	—	—	—	30	—N/a
1974	I Can Stand a Little Rain	—	11	9	—	—	12	—	—	—	11	—N/a
1975	Jamaica Say You Will	—	39	38	—	—	—	—	—	—	42	—N/a
1976	Stingray	—	35	21	—	—	—	—	—	—	70	—N/a
1978	Luxury You Can Afford	—	12	61	—	—	—	47	25	—	76	—N/a
1982	Sheffield Steel	—	14	21	10	46	—	15	14	—	105	SNEP: Gold
1984	Civilized Man	100	17	—	—	7	—	8	30	20	133	BMVI: Gold
1986	Cocker	—	9	75	—	4	2	20	48	20	50	ARIA: Platinum; BVMI: Platinum
1987	Unchain My Heart	—	24	40	21	2	14	14	32	15	89	BVMI: 3× Gold; CRIA: Gold; IFPI SWI: 2× Platinum; PROMUSICAE: Platinum; SNEP: Gold
1989	One Night of Sin	—	34	60	—	2	4	15	20	21	52	BVMI: Gold; CRIA: Gold; IFPI AUT: Platinum; IFPI SWI: Platinum
1991	Night Calls (US – 1992)	25	19	60	19	6	9	18	3	27	111	BPI: Silver; ARIA: Gold; BVMI: Platinum; IFPI AUT: Gold; IFPI SWI: Platinum; PROMUSICAE: Gold; RIANZ: Gold; SNEP: 2× Gold
1994	Have a Little Faith	9	23	—	6	3	20	2	15	7	—	BPI: Gold; BVMI: Platinum; IFPI AUT: Gold; IFPI SWI: Platinum; RIANZ: Gold; SNEP: 2× Gold
1996	Organic	49	69	—	10	5	—	15	29	35	—	BVMI: Gold; IFPI SWI: Gold; SNEP: Gold
1997	Across from Midnight	94	90	—	5	3	—	2	27	37	—	ARIA: Platinum; BEA: Platinum; BVMI: Platinum; IFPI AUT: Gold; IFPI SWI: Platinum; SNEP: Platinum
1999	No Ordinary World (US – 2000)	63	—	—	12	3	—	30	—	50	—	BEA: Gold; BVMI: Platinum; IFPI SWI: Gold; SNEP: Gold
2002	Respect Yourself	51	84	—	13	3	15	34	—	—	—	IFPI SWI: Gold; SNEP: Gold
2004	Heart & Soul (US – 2005)	—	65	—	20	14	26	39	32	—	61	—N/a
2007	Hymn for My Soul (US – 2008)	9	141	—	29	8	76	38	—	—	—	BPI: Silver; IFPI SWI: Gold; NFPP: Gold
2010	Hard Knocks (US – 2012)	61	71	—	34	1	34	41	—	52	—	BVMI: Platinum; ZPAV: Gold
2012	Fire It Up	17	109	—	128	5	—	32	—	—	—	BVMI: Platinum
"—" denotes releases that did not chart.

=== Live ===
Year	Title	Peak chart positions									Certifications (sales thresholds)
Year	Title	UK	AUS	CAN	GER	ITA	NDL	NZ	SWE	US	Certifications (sales thresholds)
1970	Mad Dogs & Englishmen	16	3	2	—	—	9	—	—	2	RIAA: Gold
1976	Live in L.A.	—	—	—	—	—	—	—	—	—	—N/a
1976	Space Captain	—	—	—	—	—	—	—	—	—	—N/a
1981	Live in New York (a.k.a. Spirit of Live Concert)	—	—	—	—	—	—	—	—	—	—N/a
1990	Joe Cocker Live	—	17	46	5	8	21	2	33	95	ARIA: Gold; BVMI: Platinum; IFPI AUT: Platinum; IFPI SWI: Platinum; RIANZ: Platinum; SNEP: Gold
1992	With a Little Help from My Friends Live – Great Hits in Concert	—	—	—	82	—	—	—	—	—	—N/a
1999	Live at the Esquire Club	—	—	—	—	—	—	—	—	—	—N/a
2001	Standing Here – Live in Colorado	—	—	—	—	—	—	—	—	—	—N/a
2006	Mad Dogs & Englishmen: The Complete Fillmore East Concerts	—	—	—	—	—	—	—	—	—	—N/a
2009	Live at Woodstock	—	—	—	—	—	—	—	—	—	—N/a
2013	Fire It Up - Live	—	—	—	—	—	—	—	—	—	—N/a
"—" denotes releases that did not chart.

=== Official compilations ===
Year	Title	Peak chart positions										Certifications (sales thresholds)
Year	Title	UK	AUS	CAN	FRA	GER	ITA	NDL	NZ	SWE	US	Certifications (sales thresholds)
1970	Portrait of Joe Cocker	—	—	—	—	—	—	—	—	—	—	—N/a
1971	The Best of Joe Cocker	—	—	—	—	—	—	6	—	—	—	—N/a
1971	Cocker Happy	—	1	—	—	—	9	—	32	—	—	—N/a
1972	Double Cocker Power!	—	—	—	—	—	—	—	—	—	—	—N/a
1977	Joe Cocker's Greatest Hits	—	—	88	—	—	—	—	2	—	114	—N/a
1983	The Best of Joe Cocker	—	1	—	—	—	—	—	32	—	—	—N/a
1986	The Voice - The Very Best of Joe Cocker	—	—	—	—	—	—	—	—	—	—	—N/a
1987	Definite 1964–1986	—	—	—	—	1	—	—	—	—	—	BVMI: Gold
1987	Classics, Volume 4 - Joe Cocker	—	—	—	—	—	—	—	—	—	—	—N/a
1990	The Collection	—	—	—	—	—	—	—	—	—	—	BPI: Gold
1992	The Best of Joe Cocker	—	70	—	1	7	14	12	10	9	—	APBD: Gold; ARIA: 2× Platinum; BVMI: Gold; GLF: Gold; IFPI AUT: Platinum; IFPI SWI: Platinum; RIANZ: Gold; SNEP: 3× Platinum; ZPAV: Gold
1992	The Legend (Polygram)	4	—	—	—	—	—	—	—	—	—	BPI: Platinum
1992	Love Songs & Ballads	—	—	—	—	76	—	—	—	—	—	—N/a
1993	The Legend (Essential Collection)	—	—	—	—	—	—	—	—	—	—	BPI: Silver; RIANZ: Platinum
1995	The Essential	—	—	—	—	—	—	—	6	—	—	BPI: Silver
1995	The Long Voyage Home (box set)	—	164	—	—	—	—	—	—	—	—	—N/a
1998	Greatest Hits	24	—	—	1	10	—	24	—	—	—	BEA: 2× Platinum; BPI: Gold; BVMI: Gold; IFPI AUT: Gold; IFPI SWI: Platinum; SNEP: 2× Gold
1999	The Anthology	—	—	—	—	—	—	—	—	—	—	—N/a
2003	Greatest Love Songs	—	—	—	—	—	—	—	—	—	—	—N/a
2003	The Ultimate Collection 1968-2003	—	—	—	8	80	—	11	—	—	—	ARIA: Gold; BPI: Gold; BVMI: Gold; RIANZ: Gold
2004	Ultimate Collection	—	—	—	—	—	—	—	—	—	122	—N/a
2006	Gold	—	—	—	—	—	—	—	—	—	—	—N/a
2007	Classic Cocker	—	38	—	—	—	—	—	9	—	167	RIANZ: Gold
2011	Icon	—	—	—	—	—	—	—	—	—	—	—N/a
2015	The Best of Joe Cocker: 20th Century Masters/The Millennium Collection	—	—	—	—	—	—	—	—	—	75	—N/a
2015	The Life of a Man: The Ultimate Hits 1968–2013	—	44	—	142	14	—	200	21	—	—	—N/a
2016	The Album Recordings 1984–2007 (box set)	—	—	—	—	—	—	—	—	—	—	—N/a
"—" denotes releases that did not chart.

=== Other albums ===
- 1967 Rag Goes Mad at the Mojo (EP compilation with two songs by Joe Cocker's Big Blues)
- 1987 Unchain My Heart (EP, remix & live)
- 1988 The 12 Mixes (mini-LP)
- 1997 Special Beck's Edition
- 2015 Joe Cocker in Interview with Robin Ross

=== Notable guest appearances ===
- 1970 Leon Russell – Leon Russell (backing vocals)
- 1971 Delaney & Bonnie – Motel Shot
- 1973 Silverhead – 16 and Savaged (backing vocals)
- 1974 John Lee Hooker – Free Beer and Chicken ("Five Long Years", "The Stratch")
- 1976 Bo Diddley – 20th Anniversary of Rock n' Roll (backing vocals)
- 1981 The Crusaders – Standing Tall ("I'm So Glad I'm Standing Here Today", "This Old World's Too Funky For Me")
- 1982 An Officer and a Gentleman Original Motion Picture Soundtrack ("Up Where We Belong", with Jennifer Warnes)
- 1984 Teachers Original Motion Picture Soundtrack ("Edge of a Dream")
- 1986 Wildcats Original Motion Picture Soundtrack ("We Stand Alone")
- 1987 The Crack Connection Original Motion Picture Soundtrack ("Now That You're Gone")
- 1987 Harry and the Hendersons Original Motion Picture Soundtrack ("Love Lives On")
- 1989 James Brown & Friends – Soul Session Live ("When a Man Loves a Woman", "I'll Go Crazy")
- 1989 Yes We Can – Artists United for Nature (charity single)
- 1991 Two Rooms: Celebrating the Songs of Elton John & Bernie Taupin ("Sorry Seems to Be the Hardest Word")
- 1992 The Cutting Edge Original Motion Picture Soundtrack ("Feels Like Forever")
- 1993 Jimmy Barnes – Flesh and Wood ("Guilty")
- 1994 Grammy's Greatest Moments Volume III (live version of "Up Where We Belong" with Jennifer Warnes)
- 1995 Sol En Si – Solidarité Enfants Sida ("Ain't No Sunshine")
- 1997 B. B. King – Deuces Wild ("Dangerous Mood")
- 1998 Eros Ramazzotti – Eros Live ("That's All I Need To Know")
- 1999 Pavarotti & Friends for Guatemala and Kosovo ("You Are So Beautiful")
- 1999 Tim Hinkley – Hinkley's Heroes Vol. 1 ("Saturday Blues")
- 1999 It's Only Rock 'N' Roll – Various Artists for Children's Promise (charity single)
- 2001 Otis Thompson – Rebirth
- 2002 Al Jarreau – All I Got ("Lost and Found")
- 2002 Lulu – Together ("Now That The Magic Has Gone")
- 2007 Across the Universe – Original Motion Picture Soundtrack ("Come Together")
- 2010 Santana – Guitar Heaven: The Greatest Guitar Classics of All Time ("Little Wing")
- 2013 Jimmy Webb – Still Within the Sound of My Voice ("The Moon's a Harsh Mistress")

== Singles ==
Year	Title	Peak chart positions										Certifications	Album
Year	Title	UK	AUS	AUT	BEL	CAN	FRA	GER	NL	SWI	US	Certifications	Album
1964	"I'll Cry Instead"	—	—	—	—	—	—	—	—	—	—		Definite 1964 – 1986
1968	"Marjorine"	48	—	—	—	—	—	—	—	—	—		With a Little Help from My Friends
1968	"With a Little Help from My Friends"	1	8	6	8	36	3	3	1	1	68	BPI: Silver	With a Little Help from My Friends
1968	"Feelin' Alright"	—	—	—	Tip	49	—	—	—	—	69		With a Little Help from My Friends
1969	"Delta Lady"	10	34	—	—	85	—	—	15	—	69		Joe Cocker!
1969	"She Came In Through the Bathroom Window"	—	—	—	—	31	—	—	18	—	30		Joe Cocker!
1970	"The Letter"	39	27	—	—	7	48	—	27	—	7		Mad Dogs & Englishmen
1970	"Cry Me a River"	—	45	—	15	15	7	—	13	—	11		Mad Dogs & Englishmen
1971	"Bird on the Wire" [Single release in Canada only]	—	—	—	—	78	—	—	—	—	—		Joe Cocker!
1971	"High Time We Went"	—	25	—	8	21	13	—	16	—	22		Joe Cocker
1972	"Feeling Alright" [re-release]	—	—	—	—	35	—	—	11	—	33		With a Little Help from My Friends
1972	"Midnight Rider"	—	49	—	—	29	—	—	—	—	27		Joe Cocker
1973	"Woman to Woman"	—	49	—		29	72	—	—	—	56		Joe Cocker
1973	"Pardon Me Sir"	—	21	—	—	83	9	—	27	—	51		Joe Cocker
1974	"Put Out the Light"	—	98	—	—	41	—	—	—	—	46		I Can Stand a Little Rain
1974	"I Can Stand a Little Rain"	—	—	—		—	—	—	—	—	—		I Can Stand a Little Rain
1975	"You Are So Beautiful"	—	32	—		4	70	—	—	—	5	BPI: Silver	I Can Stand a Little Rain
1975	"It’s All Over But the Shoutin’"	—	—	—	—	—	—	—	—	—	—		Jamaica Say You Will
1976	"The Jealous Kind"	—	—	—	—	—	—	—	—	—	—		Stingray
1976	"I Broke Down"	—	—	—	—	—	—	—	—	—	—		Stingray
1978	"Fun Time"	—	—	—	—	44	—	—	—	—	43		Luxury You Can Afford
1978	"A Whiter Shade of Pale"	—	62	—	—	—	—	—	—	—	—		Luxury You Can Afford
1978	"Lady Put the Light Out"	—	—	—	—	—	—	—	—	—	—		Luxury You Can Afford
1981	"I'm So Glad I'm Standing Here Today"; The Crusaders featuring Joe Cocker	61	—	—	—	—	—	—	—	—	97		Standing Tall (The Crusaders)
1981	"This Old World's Too Funky for Me"; The Crusaders featuring Joe Cocker	—	—	—	—	—	—	—	—	—	—		Standing Tall (The Crusaders)
1982	"With a Little Help from My Friends" / "Delta Lady" [double A-side UK re-release]	—	—	—	—	—	—	—	—	—	—		Joe Cocker's Greatest Hits
1982	"Many Rivers to Cross"	—	—	—	—	—	38	—	—	—	—		Sheffield Steel
1982	"Ruby Lee"	—	—	—	34	—	—	—	31	—	—		Sheffield Steel
1982	"Sweet Little Woman"	—	42	—	—	—	—	—	—	—	—		Sheffield Steel
1982	"Talking Back to the Night"	—	—	—	—	—	—	—	—	—	—		Sheffield Steel
1982	"Up Where We Belong" with Jennifer Warnes	7	1	14	32	1	186	6	—	7	1	ARIA: Gold; BPI: Gold; CRIA: Gold; PROMUSICAE: Gold; RIAA: Platinum	An Officer and a Gentleman: Original Soundtrack from the Paramount Motion Picture
1983	"Threw It Away"	—	—	—	35	—	—	—	43	—	104		One More Time
1984	"Civilized Man"	—	—	—	—	—	—	58	49	—	—		Civilized Man
1984	"Crazy in Love"	—	—	—	—	—	—	—	—	—	—		Civilized Man
1984	"There Goes My Baby"	—	51	—	—	—	—	—	—	—	—		Civilized Man
1984	"I Love the Night"	—	—	—	—	—	—	—	—	—	—		Civilized Man
1984	"Tempted"	—	—	—	—	—	—	—	—	—	—		Civilized Man
1984	"Even a Fool Would Let Go"	—	—	—	—	—	—	—	—	—	—		Civilized Man
1984	"Edge of a Dream"	—	70	—	—	38	—	—	—	—	69		Teachers (Soundtrack)
1985	"Shelter Me"	—	57	—	—	—	—	65	—	—	91		Cocker
1986	"Don't You Love Me Anymore"	99 ^{(1988)}	11	—	—	—	—	26	—	20	—		Cocker
1986	"You Can Leave Your Hat On"	—	23	—	—	—	48	60	—	13	—		Cocker
1986	"Heart of the Matter"	—	—	—	—	—	—	—	—	—	—		Cocker
1986	"Now That You're Gone"	—	—	—	—	—	—	33	—	18	—		Zabou - OMP Soundtrack
1987	"Love Lives On"	—	—	—	22	—	—	—	—	—	—		Harry and the Hendersons: Original Motion Picture Soundtrack
1987	"Unchain My Heart"	46	17	—	40	—	25	33	27	15	—		Unchain My Heart
1987	"A Woman Loves a Man"	—	88	—	—	30	—	63	—	—	—		Unchain My Heart
1987	"All Our Tomorrows"	—	—	—	—	64	—	—	—	—	—		Unchain My Heart
1988	"Two Wrongs"	—	—	—	—	—	—	—	—	—	—		Unchain My Heart
1988	"With a Little Help from My Friends" [UK re-release]	—	—	—	—	—	—	—	—	—	—		Definite 1964 – 1986
1989	"When the Night Comes"	65	39	9	—	23	—	25	29	7	11		One Night of Sin
1989	"Fever"	—	112	—	—	—	—	—	—	—	—		One Night of Sin
1989	"I'm Your Man" [Charting B-side to "Fever"]	—	—	—	—	60	—	—	—	—	—		One Night of Sin
1989	"I Will Live for You"	—	134	—	—	—	—	—	—	—	—		One Night of Sin
1989	"Up Where We Belong" [re-release] Joe Cocker and Jennifer Warnes	92	—	—	—	—	—	—	—	—	—		Definite 1964 – 1986
1990	"What Are You Doing with a Fool Like Me"	—	115	—	—	90	—	39	—	23	96		Joe Cocker Live
1990	"You Are So Beautiful" (Live)	—	—	—	—	—	—	—	36	—	—		Joe Cocker Live
1990	"You Can Leave Your Hat On" (Live Remix)	—	—	—	—	—	—	—	—	—	—		Joe Cocker Live
1990	"Living in the Promiseland"	—	—	—	—	—	—	—	—	—	—		Joe Cocker Live
1991	"Night Calls"	—	133	—	—	—	11	37	44	—	—		Night Calls
1991	"I Can Hear the River"	—	—	—	—	—	—	—60	—	31	—		Night Calls
1992	"(All I Know) Feels Like Forever"	25	61	—	—	88	38	64	51	—	—		The Cutting Edge: Original MGM Motion Picture Soundtrack
1992	"Now That the Magic Has Gone"	28	107	—	—	71	—	—	—	—	—		Night Calls (US Version)
1992	"Love Is Alive"	—	—	—	—	72	—	—	—	—	—		Night Calls
1992	"Unchain My Heart" (90's Version)	17	—	—	—	—	—	—	—	—	—		The Best of Joe Cocker
1992	"Five Women" / "Unchain My Heart" (90's Version)	—	—	—	—	—	—	—	—	—	—		The Best of Joe Cocker
1992	"When the Night Comes" [re-release]	61	—	—	—	—	—	—	—	—	—		The Best of Joe Cocker
1993	"Bye Bye Blackbird"	—	—	—	—	—	—	—	—	—	—		Sleepless in Seattle: Original Motion Picture Soundtrack
1994	"Summer in the City"	—	149	10	6	—	33	23	23	5	—		Have a Little Faith
1994	"The Simple Things"	17	—	—	23	33	—	46	30	—	—		Have a Little Faith
1994	"Take Me Home" with Bekka Bramlett	41	143	—	—	—	—	—	—	—	—		Have a Little Faith
1994	"Let the Healing Begin"	32	—	—	—	—	—	51	37	—	—		Have a Little Faith
1995	"Have a Little Faith in Me"	67	106	—	—	51	—	—	—	—	—		Have a Little Faith
1995	"Highway Highway"	—	—	—	—	—	—	—	—	—	—		Have a Little Faith
1996	"Don't Let Me Be Misunderstood"	53	152	22	58	—	—	64	45	—	—		Organic
1996	"Into the Mystic"	—	—	—	—	—	—	—	—	—	—		Organic
1997	"Could You Be Loved"	96	188	39	—	—	—	77	88	46	—		Across from Midnight
1997	"N'Oubliez Jamais"	—	—	11	7	—	10	61	72	—	—	BEA: Gold; SNEP: Gold	Across from Midnight
1997	"Tonight"	—	—	—	59	—	—	73	83	—	—		Across from Midnight
1998	"What Do I Tell My Heart?"	—	—	—	—	—	—	—	—	—	—		Across from Midnight
1998	"What Becomes of the Brokenhearted"	—	—	24	6	—	—	67	—	—	—		Greatest Hits
1998	"That's All I Need to Know (Difenderò)" (Live) with Eros Ramazzotti	—	—	—	37	—	—	86	—	—	—		Eros Live with Eros Ramazzotti
1999	"Different Roads"	118	—	—	60	—	—	68	91	—	—		No Ordinary World
1999	"First We Take Manhattan"	—	—	—	—	—	—	74	—	—	—		No Ordinary World
1999	"No Ordinary World"	—	—	—	—	—	—	—	—	—	—		No Ordinary World
1999	"On My Way Home"	—	—	—	—	—	—	—	—	—	—		No Ordinary World
2000	"My Father's Son"	—	—	—	—	—	—	—	—	—	—		No Ordinary World
2002	"You Can't Have My Heart"	—	—	64	—	—	—	75	—	64	—		Respect Yourself
2002	"Never Tear Us Apart"	85	—	—	38	—	—	—	—	—	—		Respect Yourself
2002	"This Is Your Life"	—	—	—	—	—	—	—	—	—	—		Respect Yourself
2004	"Every Kind of People"	—	—	—	—	—	—	—	—	—	—		Heart & Soul
2004	"One"	—	—	—	—	—	—	—	—	—	—		Heart & Soul
2007	"Hymn 4 My Soul"	—	—	46	—	—	—	60	—	65	—		Hymn for My Soul
2007	"Just Pass It On"	113	—	—	—	—	—	—	—	—	—		Hymn for My Soul
2010	"Hard Knocks"	—	—	—	66	—	—	—	—	65	—		Hard Knocks
2010	"Unforgiven"	—	—	—	—	—	—	—	—	—	—		Hard Knocks
2012	"Fire It Up"	64	—	—	70	—	—	48	—	50	—		Fire It Up
2013	"I Come in Peace"	—	—	—	64	—	—	79	—	—	—		Fire It Up
2013	"Up Where We Belong" (Live)	—	—	—	—	—	—	—	—	—	—		Fire It Up Live
"—" denotes releases that did not chart or were not released in that territory.

- ^{(1988)} "Don't You Love Me Anymore" was not released in the UK until June 1988

== Videography ==
=== Video albums ===
- 1970 Woodstock: 3 Days of Peace & Music (motion picture)
- 1971 Joe Cocker, Mad Dogs & Englishmen (motion picture) (DVD – 2005)
- 1986 Joe Cocker Music Video
- 1990 A Tribute to John Lennon – Live ("Isolation")
- 1992 The Best of Joe Cocker Live (Dortmund, Germany, 1992) (DVD – 2006)
- 1994 Have a Little Faith (biography)
- 1997 Joe Cocker Live: Across from Midnight Tour (Germany, 1997) (DVD – 2004)
- 2001 Joe Cocker in Concert (Germany, 1996)
- 2002 Joe Cocker Live (Italy, 1981)
- 2002 Party at the Palace (London, 2002, "With a Little Help from My Friends", "All You Need Is Love")
- 2003 Joe Cocker (DVD EP)
- 2004 Joe Cocker Live: Across from Midnight Tour (Waldbuhne, Berlin, Germany, 1997)
- 2004 The Best of Joe Cocker Live (Dortmund, Germany, 1992, and Cologne, Germany, 2002)
- 2005 Feeling Alright*
- 2005 Respect Yourself Live
- 2005 Live at Montreux 1987
- 2008 Cry Me a River (Rockpalast, 1983)

=== Music videos ===
Year	Title	Album
1968	"With a Little Help from My Friends"	With a Little Help from My Friends
1969	"Dear Landlord"	Joe Cocker!
1982	"Up Where We Belong" (with Jennifer Warnes)	An Officer and a Gentleman soundtrack
1984	"Civilized Man"	Civilized Man
1984	"Edge of a Dream"	Teachers soundtrack
1986	"Shelter Me"	Cocker
1986	"Don't You Love Me Anymore"	Cocker
1986	"You Can Leave Your Hat On" (2 versions)	Cocker
1987	"Unchain My Heart"	Unchain My Heart
1987	"A Woman Loves a Man"	Unchain My Heart
1989	"When the Night Comes"	One Night of Sin
1990	"What Are You Doing with a Fool Like Me"	Joe Cocker Live
1990	"Living in the Promiseland"	Joe Cocker Live
1991	"Night Calls"	Night Calls
1991	"I Can Hear the River"	Night Calls
1992	"(All I Know) Feels Forever"	The Cutting Edge soundtrack
1992	"Now That the Magic Has Gone"	Night Calls (US Version)
1994	"Summer in the City"	Have a Little Faith
1994	"The Simplest Things"	Have a Little Faith
1994	"Take Me Home" (with Bekka Bramlett)	Have a Little Faith
1994	"Let the Healing Begin"	Have a Little Faith
1995	"Have a Little Faith in Me"	Have a Little Faith
1996	"Don't Let Me Be Misunderstood"	Organic
1997	"Could You Be Loved"	Across from Midnight
1997	"N'Oubliez Jamais"	Across from Midnight
1997	"Tonight"	Across from Midnight
1999	"What Becomes of the Brokenhearted"	Greatest Hits
1999	"Different Roads"	No Ordinary World
2002	"Never Tear Us Apart"	Respect Yourself
2012	"Fire It Up"	Fire It Up
2013	"I Come in Peace"	Fire It Up
