= The Long Voyage Home (album) =

Box set by Joe Cocker
- Released: 21 November 1995
- Recorded: 1964–1994
- Genre: Rock
- Label: A&M

Joe Cocker chronology
Have a Little Faith (1994)	The Long Voyage Home (1995)	Organic (1996)

Professional ratings
Review scores
Source	Rating
Allmusic	4.5/5 stars

The Long Voyage Home is a four-disc boxed set compilation by English singer Joe Cocker, released in 1995. There are 7 songs by The Beatles and sung by Cocker, "With a Little Help from My Friends", "I'll Cry Instead", "Let It Be", "She Came In Through the Bathroom Window", "Something", "You've Got to Hide Your Love Away" and finally "With a Little Help from My Friends" (live at Woodstock '94).

== Track listing ==
=== Disc 1 ===
1. "With a Little Help from My Friends" – 5:14
2. "I'll Cry Instead" (Philips single A-side, 1964) – 1:46
3. "(Those) Precious Words" (Philips single B-side, 1964) – 2:41
4. "Marjorine" – 2:41
5. "Bye Bye Blackbird" – 3:32
6. "Just Like a Woman" – 5:19
7. "Don't Let Me Be Misunderstood" – 4:43
8. "Do I Still Figure in Your Life" (live at Cobo Hall, Detroit, Michigan, 1969)† – 3:54
9. "Feelin' Alright" (live at the Fillmore West, San Francisco, California, 1969)† – 5:00
10. "I Shall Be Released" (live at the Fillmore West, 1969)† – 5:24
11. "Something's Coming On" (live at the Fillmore West, 1969)† – 3:41
12. "I Don't Need No Doctor" (live at the Fillmore West, 1969)† – 11:45
13. "Let It Be" (live at the Fillmore West, 1969)† – 5:15
14. "Delta Lady" – 2:52
15. "She Came In Through the Bathroom Window" – 2:40
16. "Hitchcock Railway" (live at the Fillmore West, 1969)† – 6:25

=== Disc 2 ===
1. "Dear Landlord" (live at Cobo Hall, 1969)† – 7:22
2. "Darling Be Home Soon" – 4:45
3. "Something" (live at Cobo Hall, 1969)† – 3:41
4. "Wake Up Little Susie"† – 4:09
5. "The Letter" – 4:26
6. "Space Captain" – 5:01
7. "Cry Me a River" – 4:00
8. "Let's Go Get Stoned" – 7:41
9. "Please Give Peace a Chance" – 4:20
10. "Blue Medley" – 12:34
11. "The Weight"† – 6:02
12. "High Time We Went" – 4:28
13. "Black-Eyed Blues" – 4:36
14. "Midnight Rider" – 3:59

=== Disc 3 ===
1. "Woman to Woman" – 4:31
2. "Something to Say"† – 5:26
3. "She Don't Mind"† – 3:07
4. "Pardon Me Sir" – 3:16
5. "Put Out the Light" – 4:13
6. "I Can Stand a Little Rain" – 3:34
7. "The Moon Is a Harsh Mistress" – 3:32
8. "You Are So Beautiful" – 2:44
9. "Guilty" – 2:49
10. "I Think It's Going to Rain Today" – 4:00
11. "Jamaica Say You Will" – 4:16
12. "The Jealous Kind" – 3:51
13. "Catfish" – 5:25
14. "A Song for You" – 6:27
15. "Fun Time" – 2:42
16. "I'm So Glad I'm Standing Here Today" – 5:05
17. "Ruby Lee" – 4:25
18. "Many Rivers to Cross" – 3:43

=== Disc 4 ===
1. "So Good, So Right" – 2:37
2. "Up Where We Belong" – 3:59
3. "I Love the Night" – 3:42
4. "Civilized Man" – 3:56
5. "Edge of a Dream" – 3:55
6. "You Can Leave Your Hat On" – 4:18
7. "Unchain My Heart" – 5:23
8. "I've Got to Use My Imagination" – 4:22
9. "I'm Your Man" – 3:55
10. "When the Night Comes" – 4:49
11. "Can't Find My Way Home" – 3:30
12. "Don't Let the Sun Go Down on Me" – 5:33
13. "You've Got to Hide Your Love Away" – 5:01
14. "Love Is Alive" – 4:32
15. "With a Little Help from My Friends" (live at Woodstock '94) – 9:43
- † - Previously unreleased material

== Charts ==
Chart (1995)	Peak position
Australian Albums (ARIA)	163
