= The Legend (Joe Cocker album) =

1992 compilation album by Joe Cocker

The Legend is a compilation album by English singer Joe Cocker, released in 1992 by Polygram TV.

== Track listing ==
Source: Album cover

1. "Up Where We Belong" (with Jennifer Warnes) (Jack Nitzsche, Buffy Sainte-Marie, Will Jennings)
2. "With a Little Help from My Friends" (John Lennon, Paul McCartney)
3. "Delta Lady" (Leon Russell)
4. "The Letter" (Wayne Carson Thompson)
5. "She Came In Through the Bathroom Window" (John Lennon, Paul McCartney)
6. "A Whiter Shade Of Pale" (Gary Brooker, Keith Reid, Matthew Fisher)
7. "Love the One You're With" (live) (Stephen Stills)
8. "You Are So Beautiful" (Billy Preston, Bruce Fisher)
9. "Let It Be" (John Lennon, Paul McCartney)
10. "Just Like a Woman" (Bob Dylan)
11. "Many Rivers to Cross" (Jimmy Cliff)
12. "Talking Back to the Night" (Steve Winwood and Will Jennings)
13. "Fun Time" (Allen Toussaint)
14. "I Heard It Through the Grapevine" (Norman Whitfield, Barrett Strong)
15. "Give Peace a Chance" (live) (Leon Russell, Bonnie Bramlett)
16. "Don't Let Me Be Misunderstood" (Gloria Caldwell, Sol Marcus, Bennie Benjamin)
17. "Honky Tonk Women" (live) (Mick Jagger, Keith Richards)
18. Cry Me a River" (live) (Arthur Hamilton)
- Track 1 taken from the soundtrack An Officer and a Gentleman
- Track 2, 10, 16 taken from With a Little Help from My Friends
- Track 3, 5 taken from Joe Cocker!
- Track 4, 15, 17, 18 taken from Mad Dogs & Englishmen (album)
- Track 6, 13, 14 taken from Luxury You Can Afford
- Track 7 taken from Live in L.A.
- Track 8 taken from I Can Stand a Little Rain
- Track 9 taken from the CD version of Joe Cocker!
- Track 11, 12 taken from Sheffield Steel

== Chart performance ==
Chart (1992)	Peak position
UK Albums (Official Charts)	4
