= Respect Yourself (album) =

Studio album by Joe Cocker
- Released: 16 July 2002
- Recorded: 2001−2002
- Studio: Henson Recording Studios (Hollywood, California)
- Genre: Rock
- Length: 46:31
- Label: EMI
- Producer: John Shanks

Joe Cocker chronology
No Ordinary World (1999)	Respect Yourself (2002)	Greatest Love Songs (2003)

Professional ratings
Review scores
Source	Rating
CD Universe	4/5 stars
Amazon.com	4/5 stars

Respect Yourself is the eighteenth studio album by English singer Joe Cocker, released in 2002.

== Track listing ==
1. "You Can't Have My Heart" (John Shanks, Tonio K, C. J. Vanston) – 4:01
2. "Love Not War" (Barbara Griffin, Tom Snow) – 4:00
3. "You Took It So Hard" (Shanks, Tonio K, Vanston) – 4:27
4. "Never Tear Us Apart" (Andrew Farriss, Michael Hutchence) – 4:03
5. "This Is Your Life" (Shelly Peiken, Shanks) – 4:34
6. "Respect Yourself" (Luther Ingram, Mark Rice) – 5:14
7. "I'm Listening Now" (Shanks, Tonio K) – 5:01
8. "Leave a Light On" (Peiken, Shanks, Vanston) – 4:34
9. "It's Only Love" (Peiken, Shanks) – 3:55
10. "Every Time It Rains" (Randy Newman) – 3:34
11. "Midnight Without You" (Chris Botti, Paul Buchanan, Paul Joseph Moore) – 5:08

== Personnel ==
- Joe Cocker – vocals
- Jamie Muhoberac – acoustic piano (1, 3–8, 10, 11), keyboards (2), Wurlitzer electric piano (6, 7), synthesizers (6, 11), Hammond B3 organ (8, 9)
- C. J. Vanston – Hammond B3 organ (1, 5), horn arrangements (1, 5, 11), acoustic piano (3)
- Patrick Warren – keyboards (1, 10, 11), acoustic piano (2, 9), Chamberlin (3, 4, 8), synth strings (4, 5), Hammond B3 organ (6, 7), Wurlitzer electric piano (8), synthesizers (8), string arrangements (10, 11)
- John Shanks – guitars, backing vocals (4, 5, 9)
- Tim Pierce – guitars (1, 7, 9)
- Rusty Anderson – guitars (10)
- Paul Bushnell – bass
- Kenny Aronoff – drums
- Lenny Castro – percussion (2–6, 8, 11)
- Bruce Eskovitz – saxophones (1, 5, 6, 11)
- Nick Lane – trombone (1, 5, 6, 11)
- Bill Churchville and Chris Tedesco – trumpets (1, 5, 6, 11)
  - Chris Tedesco – trumpet solo (11)
- Julia Tillman Waters – backing vocals (1, 3)
- Maxine Waters Willard – backing vocals (1, 3)
- Fred White – backing vocals (1, 3)
- C.C. White – backing vocals (2, 6, 8, 11)
- Lucy Woodward – backing vocals (5, 9)

== Production ==
- John Shanks – producer
- Marc DeSisto – mixing, engineer (1, 2, 4–6, 8, 11)
- Trina Shoemaker – engineer (1, 3, 7, 9, 10)
- Mark Valentine – second engineer
- Brett Patrick – third engineer
- Brian Cook – second mix engineer
- Dan Chase – Pro Tools editing
- Robert Hadley – mastering
- Doug Sax – mastering
- The Mastering Lab (Hollywood, California) – mastering location
- Jeri Heiden – art direction, design
- John Heiden – art direction, design
- James Minchin III – photography
- Roger Davies – management
- Ray Neapolitan – management

== Charts ==
=== Weekly charts ===
Chart (2002)	Peak position
Australian Albums (ARIA Charts)	84
Austrian Albums (Ö3 Austria)	12
Belgian Albums (Ultratop Flanders)	6
Belgian Albums (Ultratop Wallonia)	6
Danish Albums (Hitlisten)	28
Dutch Albums (Album Top 100)	34
Finnish Albums (Suomen virallinen lista)	35
French Albums (SNEP)	13
German Albums (Offizielle Top 100)	3
Italian Albums (FIMI)	15
Norwegian Albums (VG-lista)	30
Polish Albums (ZPAV)	13
Scottish Albums (OCC)	72
Swiss Albums (Schweizer Hitparade)	5
UK Albums (OCC)	51

=== Year-end charts ===
Chart (2002)	Position
Belgian Albums (Ultratop Wallonia)	71
French Albums (SNEP)	124
German Albums (Offizielle Top 100)	92
Swiss Albums (Schweizer Hitparade)	65

== Certifications ==
Region	Certification	Certified units/sales
France (SNEP)	Gold	100,000^{*}
Switzerland (IFPI Switzerland)	Gold	20,000^{^}
^{*} Sales figures based on certification alone.^{^} Shipments figures based on certification alone.
