= Civilized Man =

Studio album by Joe Cocker
- Released: May 1984
- Recorded: 1984
- Studios: The Village Recorder (Los Angeles, California); Ocean Way Recording (Hollywood, California); House of David (Nashville, Tennessee); Soundworks Digital Audio/Video (New York City, New York)
- Genres: Rock, pop
- Length: 36:43
- Label: Capitol
- Producers: Gary Katz; Stewart Levine

Joe Cocker chronology
Sheffield Steel (1982)	Civilized Man (1984)	Cocker (1986)

Professional ratings
Review scores
Source	Rating
AllMusic	2/5 stars

Civilized Man is the tenth studio album by the British artist Joe Cocker, released in May 1984, his first on the Capitol label. It includes a cover of the 1981 Squeeze hit "Tempted", as well as "There Goes My Baby", a 1959 hit single from the Drifters.

Songs for the album were recorded at two different sessions. Side "A", recorded at The Village Recorders in Los Angeles, was produced by Gary Katz and features as a backing band the core of the then current group Toto (Steve Lukather, Jeff Porcaro, and David Paich), whereas side "B", recorded in Nashville, was produced by Stewart Levine, and features Music City stalwarts (David Briggs, Reggie Young and Larrie Londin). The album also features an appearance by Joe Cocker's former bandmate Jim Keltner (on "Long Drag Off a Cigarette").

Civilized Man, along with its predecessor Sheffield Steel, marked the beginning of a new era of Joe Cocker albums, giving way to a much fuller style of production and taking more advantage of technology to experiment to produce more contemporary sounding music. Civilized Man expanded on the success of his previous album, selling well in Europe.

== Track listing ==
1. "Civilized Man" (Richard Feldman, Pat Robinson) – 3:55
2. "There Goes My Baby" (George Treadwell, Lover Patterson, Benjamin Nelson) – 3:47
3. "Come On In" (Bob Telson) – 3:48
4. "Tempted" (Chris Difford, Glenn Tilbrook) – 4:16
5. "Long Drag Off a Cigarette" (Larry John McNally) – 2:35
6. "I Love the Night" (Troy Seals, Michael Reid) – 3:47
7. "Crazy in Love" (Randy McCormick, Even Stevens) – 3:51
8. "A Girl Like You" (Troy Seals, Will Jennings) – 3:09
9. "Hold On (I Feel Our Love Is Changing)" (Joe Sample, Will Jennings) – 3:41
10. "Even a Fool Would Let Go" (Tom Snow, Kerry Chater) – 3:54

== Personnel ==
- Joe Cocker – lead vocals
- David Paich – Hammond organ (1, 4)
- Greg Phillinganes – Yamaha GS1 (1), Yamaha DX7 (2), acoustic piano (3–5)
- Rob Mounsey – acoustic piano (2), electric piano (3), Roland Jupiter-8 (5)
- Bob Telson – Oberheim OB-Xa (2, 3), Hammond organ (3), horn arrangements (4)
- David Briggs – keyboards (6, 8–10), string arrangements (7, 10)
- Shane Keister – synthesizers (6, 8–10)
- Randy McCormick – Fender Rhodes (7)
- Steve Lukather – guitars (1), electric guitar (2–4)
- Domenic Troiano – lead guitar (2), rhythm guitar (2), electric guitar (3)
- Larry John McNally – acoustic guitar (5)
- Jon Goin – guitars (6, 8, 10)
- Reggie Young – lead guitar (6), guitars (8)
- Pete Bordonali – guitars (7, 9)
- Dann Huff – guitars (7, 9), guitar solo (10)
- Dean Parks – guitars (9, 10)
- Nathan East – bass (1–5)
- Bob Wray – bass (6, 8)
- David Hungate – bass (7, 9, 10)
- Jeff Porcaro – drums (1–4)
- Jim Keltner – drums (5)
- Larrie Londin – drums (6, 8)
- James Stroud – drums (7, 9, 10)
- Starz Vanderlocket – percussion (1, 2, 4)
- Paulinho da Costa – percussion (6–8)
- Dave Tofani – tenor saxophone (4)
- Jim Horn – alto saxophone (8)
- Dave Bargeron – trombone (4)
- Randy Brecker – trumpet (4)
- Sid Sharp – strings (7, 10)
- Mary Davis – backing vocals (1, 4)
- Cissy Houston – backing vocals (1, 4)
- Deirdre Tuck Corley – backing vocals (1, 4)
- Bobbie Butler – backing vocals (2, 3)
- Sam Butler Jr. – backing vocals (2, 3)
- James W. Carter – backing vocals (2, 3)
- Frank Floyd – backing vocals (3, 5)
- Zach Sanders – backing vocals (3, 5)
- Julia Tillman Waters – backing vocals (9)
- Maxine Willard Waters – backing vocals (9)
- Luther Waters – backing vocals (9)
- Oren Waters – backing vocals (9)

Production

- Gary Katz – producer (1–5)
- Daniel Lazerus – additional in-studio production (1–5), engineer (1–5), mixing (1–5)
- Stewart Levine – producer (6–10)
- Rik Pekkonen – recording (6–10), mixing (6–10)
- Robin Lane – assistant engineer (1–5)
- Phil Wagner – assistant engineer (1–5)
- Wayne Yurgelon – assistant mix engineer (1–5), digital maintenance (1–5)
- Mark Ettel – additional recording (6–10), assistant mix engineer (6–10)
- Lynn Peterzell – assistant engineer (6–10)
- Mike Morongell – digital maintenance (1–5)
- Bob Ludwig – mastering at Masterdisk (New York, NY)
- Roy Kohara – art direction
- John O'Brien – design
- Jim A. Salvati – lettering
- Richard Avedon – photography

== Chart performance ==
Year	Chart	Position
1984	Swiss Albums Chart	5
1984	Norway Albums Chart	5
1984	German Albums Chart	7
1984	Dutch Albums Chart	8
1984	Australian Albums Chart	17
1984	Austrian Albums Chart	19
1984	Swedish Albums Chart	20
1984	New Zealand Albums Chart	30
1984	UK Albums Chart	100
1984	US Albums Chart	133

== Sales accomplishments ==
Region	Certification	Certified units/sales
Germany (BVMI)	Gold	250,000^{^}
^{^} Shipments figures based on certification alone.
