= Standing Here – Live in Colorado =

Live album by Joe Cocker
- Released: 1 January 2001
- Recorded: 2 May 1981 at Denver, Colorado
- Genre: Rock
- Length: CD I – 44:05; CD II – 43:49
- Label: NMC
- Producer: Carlton Sandercock

Joe Cocker chronology
Live in New York (1981)	Standing Here – Live in Colorado (2001)	Sheffield Steel (1982)

Standing Here – Live in Colorado is a live album documenting English singer Joe Cocker's performance in Denver, Colorado on 2 May 1981.

By the time this concert was recorded, Joe Cocker was coming to the end of a two-and-a-half-year period during which he was without a recording contract, and in some cases, back to playing clubs; he was also struggling with drug and alcohol addiction.

During that period, Cocker recorded "I'm So Glad I'm Standing Here Today" and "This Old World's Too Funky For Me" for the Crusaders' album Standing Tall. Will Jennings' lyrics led to a Grammy nomination for best inspirational performance. The Grammy wasn't to be, yet the performance with the Crusaders was a success. It received a standing ovation and broadcast on national (live) television across America. It triggered Cocker's comeback.

The album, a two-CD set, has also been released as Standing Here – Live in Denver and simply Live In America.

It includes several live versions of Cocker's classics as well as a pair of tracks which also appeared on Cocker’s 1981 LP release Live in New York—- "I Don't Want To Live Without Your Love" (which appeared on Live in New York as “So Blue”) and "Sweet Forgiveness"— neither of which appear on any other Cocker albums other than these two. Additionally, included here are a few live versions of songs from Luxury You Can Afford, at the time his latest album (1978), such as "I Heard It Through The Grapevine" and Procol Harum's "A Whiter Shade of Pale". The live concert also included five tracks that would appear in studio versions on Cocker’s 1982 Sheffield Steel album the following year— “Shocked”, “Sweet Little Woman”, “Just Like Always”, the Bob Dylan song “Seven Days”, and “Look What You’ve Done”, the last of which also appeared on 1981’s Live in New York.

== Track listing ==
Disc One

1. Feeling Alright (Dave Mason) - 4:27
2. I Can't Say No (John Bettis, Daniel Moore) - 3:00
3. Put Out The Light (Daniel Moore) - 3:56
4. Look What You’ve Done (Leo Nocentelli) - 4:13
5. A Whiter Shade Of Pale (Keith Reid, Gary Brooker) - 6:01
6. Sweet Little Woman (Andy Fraser) - 4:59
7. I Don’t Want To Live Without Your Love (a.k.a. So Blue) (Bob Leinbach) - 5:22
8. Just Like Always (Jimmy Webb) - 4:00
9. Shocked (Ira Ingber/Gregg Sutton) - 4:11
10. Seven Days (Bob Dylan) - 3:53

Disc Two

1. Jealous Kind (Bobby Charles)
2. Hitchcock Railway (Don Dunn/Tony McCashen)
3. Watching The River Flow (Bob Dylan)
4. You Are So Beautiful (Billy Preston, Bruce Fisher)
5. Sweet Forgiveness (Daniel Moore)
6. With A Little Help From My Friends (John Lennon, Paul McCartney)
7. The Letter (Wayne Carson)
8. The Moon Is A Harsh Mistress (Jimmy Webb)
9. I Heard It Through The Grapevine (Norman Whitfield, Barrett Strong)

== Personnel ==
- Lead vocals - Joe Cocker
- Guitar - Cliff Goodwin
- Bass - Howard Hersh
- Drums- B.J. Wilson
- Keyboards - Loury Marshall
- Piano - Mitch Chakour
- Backing vocals - Maxine Green, Beverly Michael
