= Live at Woodstock (Joe Cocker album) =

Live album by Joe Cocker
- Released: 6 October 2009
- Recorded: 17 August 1969
- Venue: Woodstock
- Length: 77:06
- Label: A&M, Universal

Joe Cocker chronology
Hymn for My Soul (2007)	Live at Woodstock (2009)	Hard Knocks (2010)

Professional ratings
Review scores
Source	Rating
AllMusic	4/5 stars

Live at Woodstock is a live album documenting English singer Joe Cocker's famous performance with The Grease Band at Woodstock Festival on 17 August 1969. It was released officially for the first time in 2009 by A&M/Universal.

== Track listing ==
1. "Dear Landlord" (Bob Dylan) - 8:41
2. "Something's Coming On" (Joe Cocker / Chris Stainton) - 4:03
3. "Do I Still Figure in Your Life" (Pete Dello) - 3:59
4. "Feelin' Alright" (Dave Mason) - 5:23
5. "Just Like a Woman" (Bob Dylan) - 6:23
6. "Let's Go Get Stoned" (Jo Armstead / Nickolas Ashford / Valerie Simpson) - 7:06
7. "I Don't Need No Doctor" (Jo Armstead / Nickolas Ashford / Valerie Simpson) - 12:13
8. "I Shall Be Released" (Bob Dylan) - 5:59
9. "Hitchcock Railway" (Don Dunn / Tony McCashen) - 5:51
10. "Something to Say" (Joe Cocker / Peter Nichols) - 9:22
11. "With a Little Help from My Friends" (John Lennon / Paul McCartney) - 8:06

== Personnel ==
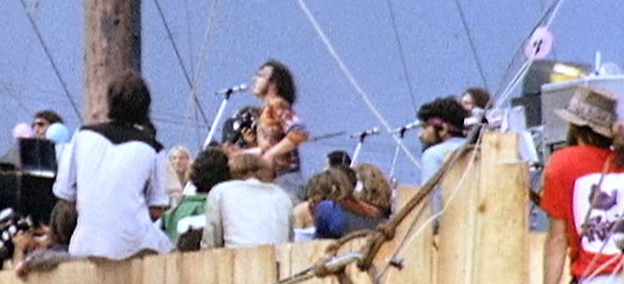
Cocker performing at Woodstock in 1969

- Joe Cocker - lead vocals
- Chris Stainton - keyboards
- Henry McCullough - lead guitar
- Neil Hubbard - rhythm guitar
- Alan Spenner - bass guitar
- Bruce Rowland - drums, percussion
- Bobby Torres - congas
