= Joe Cocker's Greatest Hits =

Greatest hits album by Joe Cocker
- Released: November 1977
- Genre: Rock
- Label: A&M

Joe Cocker chronology
Space Captain (1976)	Joe Cocker's Greatest Hits (1977)	Luxury You Can Afford (1978)

Professional ratings
Review scores
Source	Rating
Allmusic	3/5 stars
Christgau's Record Guide	A−
Tom Hull – on the Web	B+

Joe Cocker's Greatest Hits is a greatest hits album by English singer Joe Cocker. It was released in 1977.

== Track listing ==
1. "With a Little Help from My Friends" (John Lennon, Paul McCartney) - 5:02
2. "Woman to Woman" (Joe Cocker, Chris Stainton) - 4:28
3. "The Jealous Kind" (Robert Guidry) - 3:48
4. "Black-Eyed Blues" (Joe Cocker, Chris Stainton) - 4:35
5. "I Think It's Going to Rain Today" (Randy Newman) - 3:58
6. "Cry Me a River" [Live] (Arthur Hamilton) - 4:04
7. "You Are So Beautiful" (Billy Preston, Bruce Fisher) - 2:40
8. "Feelin' Alright" (Dave Mason) - 4:11
9. "Delta Lady" (Leon Russell) - 2:49
10. "Darling Be Home Soon" (John Benson Sebastian Jr.) - 4:41
11. "High Time We Went" (Joe Cocker, Chris Stainton) - 4:27
12. "The Letter" [Live] (Wayne Carson Thompson) - 4:17

== Chart ==
=== Weekly charts ===
Chart (1977)	Peak position
US Billboard 200	114
Chart (1982)	Peak position
New Zealand Albums (RMNZ)	2

=== Year-end charts ===
Chart (1982)	Position
New Zealand Albums (RMNZ)	40
