= Organic (Joe Cocker album) =

Studio album by Joe Cocker
- Released: 14 October 1996
- Studio: Ocean Way Recording (Hollywood, California)
- Genre: Rock
- Length: 52:21
- Label: 550
- Producer: Don Was

Joe Cocker chronology
The Long Voyage Home (1995)	Organic (1996)	Across from Midnight (1997)

Professional ratings
Review scores
Source	Rating
AllMusic	2.5/5 stars

Organic is the fifteenth studio album by English singer Joe Cocker, released on 14 October 1996 in the UK.

The album sees Cocker return to his musical roots with a collection of new recordings of some of his own classics, including "You Are So Beautiful", "Delta Lady" and "Many Rivers To Cross", coupled with fresh interpretations of Van Morrison's "Into The Mystic", Bob Dylan's "Dignity" and Stevie Wonder's "You And I".

The Organic sessions were guided by producer Don Was and included performances from such musicians as Jim Keltner, Billy Preston, Chris Stainton, Dean Parks and Randy Newman.

The album was showcased in Europe throughout October 1996 with a band featuring Jim Keltner, Chris Stainton, Dean Parks, Greg Leisz, James "Hutch" Hutchinson, Stacy Campbell and occasionally Tony Joe White, culminating in three special performances at Shepherd's Bush Empire on 30 and 31 October and 1 November that year.

== Track listing ==
1. "Into the Mystic" – 3:31 (Van Morrison)
2. "Bye Bye Blackbird" – 3:31 (Morton Dixon, Ray Henderson)
3. "Delta Lady" – 3:16 (Leon Russell)
4. "Heart Full of Rain" – 4:48 (Michael Dan Ehmig, Tony Joe White)
5. "Don't Let Me Be Misunderstood" – 3:52 (Bennie Benjamin, Gloria Caldwell, Sol Marcus)
6. "Many Rivers to Cross" – 4:23 (Jimmy Cliff)
7. "High Lonesome Blue" – 4:10 (Cocker, Tony Joe White)
8. "Sail Away" – 3:00 (Randy Newman)
9. "You and I" – 4:35 (Stevie Wonder)
10. "Darling Be Home Soon" – 4:11 (John Sebastian)
11. "Dignity" – 3:13 (Bob Dylan)
12. "You Can Leave Your Hat On" – 3:46 (Newman)
13. "You Are So Beautiful" – 2:43 (Bruce Fisher, Billy Preston)
14. "Can't Find My Way Home" – 3:53 (Steve Winwood)
15. "Human Touch" – 3:46 (Bruce Springsteen)
16. "Anybody Seen My Girl" – 3:02 (Kevin Moore)
17. "Something" – 3:18 (George Harrison)

Tracks 15–17 are bonus tracks released only on a single "Don't Let Me Be Misunderstood".

== Singles ==
1. "Into the Mystic" / "Have a Little Faith in Me" / "Unchain My Heart" (90's vsn) / "Highway Highway" (France, 1996)
2. "Don't Let Me Be Misunderstood" / "Human Touch" / "Anybody Seen My Girl" / "You Can Leave Your Hat On" (France, 1996)
3. "Don't Let Me Be Misunderstood" / "Human Touch" / "Anybody Seen My Girl" (UK, 1996)
4. "Don't Let Me Be Misunderstood" / "Something" / "High Lonesome Blue" (UK, 1996)

== Personnel ==
- Joe Cocker – vocals
- Jamie Muhoberac – synthesizers (1–6, 8–10, 12–14), Hammond B3 organ (10)
- Billy Preston – Hammond B3 organ (1–5, 8, 9, 11, 12, 14)
- Chris Stainton – Wurlitzer electric piano (1, 10), acoustic piano (2–6, 11, 14)
- Randy Newman – acoustic piano (8)
- Dean Parks – acoustic guitar (1–6, 8–14)
- Johnny Lee Schell – electric guitar (1–3, 5, 6, 8, 10–12)
- Tony Joe White – electric guitar (4, 7), harmonica (4, 7)
- Greg Leisz – dobro (1, 3, 5, 6, 11)
- James "Hutch" Hutchinson – bass guitar (1–3, 5, 6, 8, 10–13)
- Darryl Jones – bass guitar (4, 7, 9, 14)
- Kenny Aronoff – drums, percussion (all tracks)
- Jim Keltner – drums, percussion (all tracks)
- Joe Porcaro – percussion (12)
- David Campbell – string arrangements and conductor (6, 8, 9, 13)
- Suzie Katayama – cello (6, 8, 9, 13)
- Rudy Stein – cello (6, 8, 9, 13)
- Denyse Buffum – viola (6, 8, 9, 13)
- Evan Wilson – viola (6, 8, 9, 13)
- Peter Kent – violin (6, 8, 9, 13)
- Sid Page – violin (6, 8, 9, 13)
- Merry Clayton – backing vocals (2, 3, 5, 12)
- Portia Griffin – backing vocals (2, 3, 5, 12)
- Maxine Sharp – backing vocals (2, 3, 5, 12)
- Myrna Smith – backing vocals (2, 3, 5, 12)

== Production ==
- Don Was – producer
- Rik Pekkonen – recording, mixing
- Greg Burns – second engineer
- Jeff DeMorris – assistant engineer
- Richard Huredia – assistant engineer
- Stephen Marcussen – mastering at Precision Mastering (Hollywood, California)
- Jane Oppenheimer – production assistant
- Pat Dorn – production coordinator
- Norman Moore – art direction, design
- Linda Barcojo – photography
- Roger Davies – management
- Gary Haber – business management
- Arlene Katz – business management
- Stacy Fass – legal representative
- Carol Kinzel – North American agent
- Barrie Marshall – European agent
- Ray Neapolitan – Adaven Productions representative

== Certifications ==
Region	Certification	Certified units/sales
France (SNEP)	Gold	100,000^{*}
Germany (BVMI)	Gold	250,000^{^}
Switzerland (IFPI Switzerland)	Gold	25,000^{^}
Worldwide (IFPI)	—N/a	1,000,000+
^{*} Sales figures based on certification alone.^{^} Shipments figures based on certification alone.
