= Hymn for My Soul =

Studio album by Joe Cocker
- Released: 26 March 2007
- Recorded: 2006
- Studio: Sunset Sound (Hollywood, California); Olympic Studios (London, UK)
- Genre: Rock, blues
- Length: 37:22
- Label: EMI
- Producer: Ethan Johns; T Bone Burnett, Tesse Gohl and Elliot Goldenthal (Track 11)

Joe Cocker chronology
Mad Dogs & Englishmen: The Complete Fillmore East Concerts (2006)	Hymn for My Soul (2007)	Hard Knocks (2010)

Professional ratings
Review scores
Source	Rating
AllMusic	3.5/5 stars

Hymn for My Soul is the twentieth studio album by English singer Joe Cocker, released in 2007. It was produced by Ethan Johns. Musicians on the album's sessions included Tom Petty & The Heartbreakers' Benmont Tench, drummer Jim Keltner, Mike Finnigan, guitarist Albert Lee, Dave Palmer, Greg Leisz, James Gadson, Bob Babbitt and Johns. The songs include Cocker's covers of George Harrison's "Beware of Darkness", Bob Dylan's "Ring Them Bells", John Fogerty's "Long As I Can See The Light" and Stevie Wonder's "You Haven't Done Nothin'".

The album reached No. 9 on the UK Albums Chart, becoming Cocker's highest-charting album in the UK along with Have a Little Faith (1994).

== Track listing ==
1. "You Haven't Done Nothin'" – 3:50 (Stevie Wonder)
2. "One Word (Peace)" – 2:49 (John Magnie, Tommy Malone)
3. "Love Is For Me" – 4:05 (Ziggy Modeliste, Art Neville, Leo Nocentelli, George Porter Jr.)
4. "Don't Give Up on Me" – 4:05 (Hoy Lindsey, Dan Penn, Carson Whitsett)
5. "Long as I Can See the Light" – 3:34 (John Fogerty)
6. "Beware of Darkness" – 3:51 (George Harrison)
7. "Just Pass It On" – 4:39 (Daniel Moore)
8. "Rivers Invitation" – 3:31 (Percy Mayfield)
9. "Ring Them Bells" – 3:04 (Bob Dylan)
10. "Hymn for My Soul" – 3:54 (Andy Fairweather Low)
11. "Come Together" (John Lennon, Paul McCartney) – 4:25 – US edition bonus track
12. "Hymn for My Soul" (instrumental) – 3:54 (Andy Fairweather Low) – Single B side

== Personnel ==
- Joe Cocker – vocals
- Mike Finnigan – Hammond B3 organ (1, 2, 4, 6, 8, 10)
- Dave Palmer – Wurlitzer electric piano (1, 2, 6), acoustic piano (4), pipe organ (5, 6), keyboards (7, 9)
- Benmont Tench – acoustic piano (1–3, 5–10)
- Richard Martinez – clavinet (11)
- Ethan Johns – guitars (1–3, 8), string arrangements (3, 5), harmonium (5), hurdy-gurdy (5), acoustic guitar (6), lead guitar (6), backing vocals (6), ukulele (7)
- Greg Leisz – guitars (5, 7), steel guitar (6, 9), mandolin (10)
- T Bone Burnett – baritone guitar (11)
- Mark Stewart – guitars (11), rubber bass balls (11)
- T-Bone Wolk – guitars (11), bass guitar (11)
- Albert Lee – guitars (10)
- Bob Babbitt – bass guitar (1–4, 6–8, 10)
- James Gadson – drums (1–3, 7, 8, 10)
- Jim Keltner – drums (2, 4, 6), percussion (2)
- Charley Drayton – drums (11)
- Don Heffington – congas (1, 2, 8), triangle (2), vibraslap (2)
- Horn section on "You Haven't Done Nothin'":
  - Greg Adams and Chuck Findley – trumpets
  - Tom Scott – saxophones
- David Low – cello (5)
- String section on "Love Is For Me":
  - Julie Gigante and Phillipe Levy – violins
  - Brian Denbow – viola
  - David Low – cello
- Tesse Gohl – string arrangements and orchestration (11)
- Merry Clayton – backing vocals (2, 3, 10)
- Jim Gilstrap – backing vocals (2, 3, 7, 10)
- Julianna Raye – backing vocals (2, 6)
- Tata Vega – backing vocals (2, 3, 10)
- Julia Waters – backing vocals (2, 3, 10)
- Oren Waters – backing vocals (2, 3, 7, 10)
- Benjamin Ochieng – backing vocals (7)
- Yassmin Alers – backing vocals (11)
- Tracy Nicole Chapman – backing vocals (11)
- Dana Fuchs – backing vocals (11)
- Deidre Goodwin – backing vocals (11)
- Orfeh – backing vocals (11)
- Antonique Smith – backing vocals (11)

== Production ==
- Ethan Johns – producer (1–10), engineer (1–10), mixing (1–10)
- T Bone Burnett – producer (11)
- Tesse Gohl – producer (11)
- Elliot Goldenthal – producer (11)
- Mike Piersante – mixing (11)
- Bill Mims – recording assistant (1–10)
- Neil Comber – mix assistant (1–10)
- David Emery – mix assistant (1–10)
- Dan Porter – mix assistant (1–10)
- Tim Young – mastering at Metropolis Mastering (London, UK)
- Ryan Corey – art direction, design
- Jeri Heiden – art direction, design
- Jennifer Johns – photography
- Andrew MacPherson – photography
- Roger Davies – management
- Ray Neapolitan – management
- Lisa Garrett – management
- Steven Manzano – management
- Irene Taylor – management

== Charts ==
=== Weekly charts ===
Weekly hart performance for Hymn for My Soul
Chart (2007/2008)	Peak position
Australian Albums (ARIA)	141
Austrian Albums (Ö3 Austria)	9
Belgian Albums (Ultratop Flanders)	25
Belgian Albums (Ultratop Wallonia)	22
Czech Albums (ČNS IFPI)	16
Dutch Albums (Album Top 100)	38
French Albums (SNEP)	29
German Albums (Offizielle Top 100)	8
Greek Albums (IFPI)	16
Italian Albums (FIMI)	76
Polish Albums (ZPAV)	41
Scottish Albums (OCC)	10
Spanish Albums (Promusicae)	75
Swiss Albums (Schweizer Hitparade)	4
UK Albums (OCC)	9

=== Year-end charts ===
2007 year-end chart performance for Hymn for My Soul
Chart (2007)	Position
Swiss Albums (Schweizer Hitparade)	77

== Certifications ==
Region	Certification	Certified units/sales
Russia (NFPF)	Gold	10,000^{*}
Switzerland (IFPI Switzerland)	Gold	15,000^{^}
United Kingdom (BPI)	Silver	60,000^{^}
^{*} Sales figures based on certification alone.^{^} Shipments figures based on certification alone.
