= Night Calls (album) =

Studio album by Joe Cocker
- Released: 7 October 1991
- Recorded: 1991
- Studio: A&M Studios (Hollywood, California); Village Studios (Santa Monica, California); Image Recording Studios (Los Angeles, California); Rumbo Recorders (Canoga Park, California); Metropolis Mastering (London, UK)
- Genre: Rock
- Length: 54:18 (LP); 69:40 (CD reissue)
- Label: Capitol
- Producer: Jeff Lynne; Chris Lord-Alge; David Tickle

Joe Cocker chronology
Joe Cocker Live (1990)	Night Calls (1991)	The Best of Joe Cocker (1992)

Alternative cover

Professional ratings
Review scores
Source	Rating
AllMusic	3/5 stars

Night Calls is the thirteenth studio album by English singer Joe Cocker, released on 7 October 1991 in the EU and 23 March 1992 in Cocker's native UK. There were three different editions of the album released in 1991 and 1992. Each of them featured different selections of songs, in different orders, and had different works of cover art. In addition, a DTS edition of the album was released in the UK in 1998, also with a different selection of songs.

The title track landed at number 88 on the 1991 year-end chart for the Italian singles chart, published by Musica e Dischi.

== Track listing ==
European version (1991) CDP 7 95898 2
No.	Title	Writer(s)	Length
1.	"Love Is Alive"	Gary Wright	3:57
2.	"Little Bit of Love"	Paul Rodgers, Paul Kossoff, Simon Kirke, Andy Fraser	2:28
3.	"Please No More"	Greg Hansen, David Egan	5:28
4.	"There's a Storm Coming"	John Hadley, Wally Wilson	4:08
5.	"You've Got to Hide Your Love Away"	John Lennon, Paul McCartney	5:03
6.	"I Can Hear the River"	Don Dixon	4:51
7.	"Don't Let the Sun Go Down on Me"	Elton John, Bernie Taupin	5:30
8.	"Night Calls"	Jeff Lynne	3:28
9.	"Five Women"	Prince	5:34
10.	"Can't Find My Way Home"	Steve Winwood	3:29
11.	"Not Too Young to Die of a Broken Heart"	Brent Bourgeois	4:19
12.	"Out of the Rain"	Tony Joe White	4:38

US version (1992)
No.	Title	Writer(s)	Length
1.	"Feels Like Forever"	Bryan Adams, Diane Warren	4:43
2.	"I Can Hear the River"	Don Dixon	3:42
3.	"Now That the Magic Has Gone"	John Miles	4:42
4.	"Can't Find My Way Home"	Steve Winwood	3:29
5.	"Night Calls"	Jeff Lynne	3:28
6.	"Don't Let the Sun Go Down on Me"	Elton John, Bernie Taupin	5:30
7.	"Love Is Alive"	Gary Wright	3:57
8.	"Five Women"	Prince	5:35
9.	"Please No More"	Greg Hansen, David Egan	5:28
10.	"Out of the Rain"	Tony Joe White	4:38
11.	"You've Got to Hide Your Love Away"	John Lennon, Paul McCartney	5:03
12.	"When a Woman Cries"	Joshua Kadison	4:17

2nd European version (1992) CDP 79 8886 2
No.	Title	Length
1.	"Feels Like Forever"
2.	"I Can Hear the River"
3.	"Now that the Magic Has Gone"
4.	"Unchain My Heart (90s version)"
5.	"Night Calls"
6.	"There's a Storm Coming"
7.	"Can't Find My Way Home"
8.	"Don't Let the Sun Go Down on Me"
9.	"When the Night Comes"
10.	"Five Women"
11.	"Love is Alive"
12.	"Please No More"
13.	"Out of the Rain"
14.	"You've Got to Hide Your Love Away"
15.	"When a Woman Cries"

DTS edition (1998)
No.	Title	Length
1.	"I Can Hear The River"
2.	"There's A Storm Coming"
3.	"Can't Find My Way Home"
4.	"Night Calls"
5.	"Don't Let The Sun Go Down on Me"
6.	"Five Women"
7.	"Please No More"
8.	"Out of the Rain"
9.	"You've Got To Hide Your Love Away"
10.	"Little Bit of Love"

== Personnel ==
Credits according to US release track listing.

- Joe Cocker – vocals
- Chris Stainton – acoustic piano (1, 12), keyboards (2, 4, 7, 9, 11)
- John Miles – organ (1, 3, 12), tambourine (1), backing vocals (1, 3), keyboards (3), lead guitar (3)
- Rory Kaplan – keyboards (2, 4, 9, 10)
- Greg Phillinganes – keyboards (2, 8, 9)
- Jeff Lynne – multi instruments (5)
- Benmont Tench – Hammond organ (6)
- Ian McLagan – Hammond organ (9)
- David Paich – keyboards (11)
- Phil Grande – guitars (1–4, 6–12)
- Mike Campbell – guitars (5)
- Danny Kortchmar – guitars (7, 11)
- Neil Stubenhaus – bass guitar (1, 3, 12)
- T. M. Stevens – bass guitar (2, 4–11)
- Mike Baird – drums (1, 3, 12)
- Steve Holley – drums (2, 4, 6–11), percussion (4, 6, 9–11), claves (4), tambourine (10)
- Jim Keltner – drums (5)
- Alex Acuña – percussion (2, 4, 6, 9, 10)
- Jim Brock – timbales (2)
- Deric Dyer – saxophone (12)
- Marti Jones – backing vocals (2)
- Girls Talk (Debra Lewis-Brown, Michelle Cross and Geraldine Reid) – backing vocals (2, 4, 6–9)
- Cydney Davis – backing vocals (5, 12)
- Maxine Sharp – backing vocals (5, 12)
- The Waters Sisters (Julia Tillman Waters, Maxine Waters Willard and Myrna Waters) – backing vocals (7)
- New Life Community Choir – choir (11)
- John P. Kee – choir director (11)

== Production ==
- Roger Davies – executive producer (1, 3, 12), management
- Chris Lord-Alge – producer (1, 3, 12)
- David Tickle – producer (2, 4, 6, 8–10)
- Jeff Lynne – producer (5)
- Danny Kortchmar – producer (7, 11)
- Ray Neapolitan – production assistant, personal manager

European album design

- Tommy Steele – art direction
- Johnny Lee – design
- Ana Juan – cover painting
- Allan Titmuss – photography

US album design

- Gary Kelley – cover painting
- Tim Smith – album artwork
- Herb Ritts – photography

Technical credits

- Stephen Marcussen – mastering at Precision Lacquer (Hollywood, California)
- Chris Lord-Alge – engineer (1, 3, 12), mixing (1, 3, 12)
- David Tickle – recording (2, 4, 6, 8–10), additional recording (7, 11)
- Ron Jacobs – mixing (2, 4–11)
- Shelly Yakus – mixing (2, 4–11)
- Richard Dodd – recording (5)
- Marc DeSisto – recording (7, 11)
- Mark Williams – choir recording (11)
- Rob Hart – assistant engineer (1, 3, 12)
- Talley Sherwood – assistant mix engineer (1, 3, 12)
- Greg Goldman – assistant engineer (2, 4, 6, 8, 9)
- Rick Plank – assistant engineer (2, 4, 6, 8, 9)
- Efren Herrera – assistant engineer (7)
- Brian Schueble – assistant engineer (7)

== Charts ==
=== Weekly charts ===
Chart (1991)	Peak position
Austrian Albums (Ö3 Austria)	4
Dutch Albums (Album Top 100)	18
German Albums (Offizielle Top 100)	6
Norwegian Albums (VG-lista)	12
Swedish Albums (Sverigetopplistan)	27
Swiss Albums (Schweizer Hitparade)	5

Chart (1992)	Peak position
Australian Albums (ARIA)	23
Canadian Albums (RPM)	60
French Albums (SNEP)	19
Hungarian Albums (MAHASZ)	16
New Zealand Albums (RMNZ)	3
UK Albums (OCC)	25
US Billboard 200	111

=== Year-end charts ===
Chart (1992)	Position
German Albums (Offizielle Top 100)	36
New Zealand Albums (RMNZ)	27
Swiss Albums (Schweizer Hitparade)	35

== Certifications and sales ==
Region	Certification	Certified units/sales
Australia (ARIA)	Gold	35,000^{^}
Austria (IFPI Austria)	Gold	25,000^{*}
Denmark	—	35,000
France (SNEP)	2× Gold	200,000^{*}
Germany (BVMI)	Platinum	500,000^{^}
New Zealand (RMNZ)	Gold	7,500^{^}
Spain (Promusicae)	Gold	50,000^{^}
Switzerland (IFPI Switzerland)	Platinum	50,000^{^}
United Kingdom (BPI)	Silver	60,000^{^}
Summaries
Worldwide	—	1,000,000
^{*} Sales figures based on certification alone.^{^} Shipments figures based on certification alone.
