= Live in New York (Joe Cocker album) =

Live album by Joe Cocker
- Released: 1981
- Recorded: 12 July 1980
- Venue: Central Park, New York City
- Label: Liberation, Mushroom
- Producer: Robert Deitsch

Joe Cocker chronology
| Luxury You Can Afford (1978) | Live in New York (1981) | Sheffield Steel (1982) |

Professional ratings
Review scores
| Source | Rating |
|---|---|
| AllMusic | 2/5 stars |

Live in New York is a live album from English singer Joe Cocker, recorded in New York's Central Park on July 12, 1980, to an audience of 20,000 people. Originally the album was released in Australia and Japan only (in Japan as Spirit of Live Concert). It was reissued on CD in Australia by Mushroom Records in 1999.

== Track listing ==
| No. | Title | Writer(s) | Length |
|---|---|---|---|
| 1. | "Intro" | | 0:30 |
| 2. | "Put Out The Light" | Daniel Moore | 3:40 |
| 3. | "Look What You’ve Done" | C.C. Hill | 3:38 |
| 4. | "So Blue" | B. Linebeck | 4:32 |
| 5. | "Guilty" | Randy Newman | 3:02 |
| 6. | "Jealous Kind" | Robert Guidry | 3:45 |
| 7. | "Hitchcock Railway" | Don Dunn, Tony McCashen | 4:06 |
| 8. | "Sweet Forgiveness" | Moore | 4:02 |
| 9. | "You Are So Beautiful" | Billy Preston, Bruce Fisher | 3:40 |
| 10. | "The Letter" | Wayne Carson Thompson | 3:53 |
| 11. | "With a Little Help from My Friends" | John Lennon, Paul McCartney | 6:42 |

== Personnel ==
- Joe Cocker – vocals
- Mitch Chakour – music director, piano, guitar, background vocals
- Cliff Goodwin – guitar
- Howie Hersh – bass guitar
- B. J. Wilson – drums
- Bob Leinbach – keyboards
- Maxine Green – background vocals
- Ann Lang – background vocals
- Beth Anderson – background vocals

== Production notes ==
- Executive producer: Michael Lang
- Producer: Robert Deitsch
- Engineering crew: George Thomas Musgrave, James P. McGuire, Gene Maxwell, Frank D'Ella
