= The Best of Joe Cocker (1992 album) =

Greatest hits album by Joe Cocker
- Released: 26 October 1992
- Genre: Rock
- Length: 55:52
- Label: Capitol

Joe Cocker chronology
Night Calls (1991)	The Best of Joe Cocker (1992)	Have a Little Faith (1994)

Professional ratings
Review scores
Source	Rating
AllMusic	4.5/5 stars

The Best of Joe Cocker is a compilation album by English singer Joe Cocker, released as a 16-track release in UK, Germany and the rest of the Europe in 1992 and as a 12-track release in the United States and Canada in 1993.

== Track listing (1992) ==
1. "Unchain My Heart" (90's Version) – 5:06 (Bobby Sharp, Teddy Powell) (1992)
2. "You Can Leave Your Hat On" – 4:14 (Randy Newman) (1986)
3. "When the Night Comes" – 3:56 (Bryan Adams, Jim Vallance, Diane Warren) (1989)
4. "Up Where We Belong" (Duet with Jennifer Warnes) – 3:55 (Jack Nitzsche, Buffy Sainte-Marie, Will Jennings) (1982)
5. "Now That the Magic Has Gone" – 3:56 (John Miles) (1992)
6. "Don't You Love Me Anymore" – 4:09 (Albert Hammond, Diane Warren) (1986)
7. "I Can Hear the River" – 3:41 (Don Dixon) (1991)
8. "Sorry Seems to Be the Hardest Word" – 3:57 (Elton John, Bernie Taupin) (1991)
9. "Shelter Me" – 4:20 (Nick Di Stefano) (1985)
10. "Feels Like Forever" – 4:46 (Bryan Adams, Diane Warren) (1992)
11. "Night Calls" – 3:25 (Jeff Lynne) (1991)
12. "Don't Let the Sun Go Down on Me" – 5:28 (Elton John, Bernie Taupin) (1991)
13. "Now That You're Gone" – 4:15 (Klaus Lage, Diether Dehm, Tony Carey, Joe Cocker) (1986)
14. "Civilized Man" – 3:56 (Richard Feldman, Pat Robinson) (1984)
15. "When a Woman Cries" – 4:20 (Joshua Kadison) (1992)
16. "With a Little Help from My Friends" (Live at Memorial Auditorium, Lowell, Mass., 5 October 1989.) – 9:27 (John Lennon, Paul McCartney) (Previously released on Joe Cocker Live, 1990)

== Track listing (1993) ==
1. "Unchain My Heart" (90's Version) – 5:06 (Bobby Sharp, Teddy Powell) (1992)
2. "You Can Leave Your Hat On" – 4:14 (Randy Newman) (1986)
3. "When the Night Comes" – 3:56 (Bryan Adams, Jim Vallance, Diane Warren) (1989)
4. "Up Where We Belong" (Duet with Jennifer Warnes) – 3:55 (Jack Nitzsche, Buffy Sainte-Marie, Will Jennings) (1982)
5. "Now That the Magic Has Gone" – 3:56 (John Miles) (1992)
6. "Don't You Love Me Anymore" – 4:09 (Albert Hammond, Diane Warren) (1986)
7. "Shelter Me" – 4:20 (Nick Di Stefano) (1985)
8. "Feels Like Forever" – 4:46 (Bryan Adams, Diane Warren) (1992)
9. "Night Calls" – 3:25 (Jeff Lynne) (1991)
10. "Sorry Seems to Be the Hardest Word" – 3:57 (Elton John, Bernie Taupin) (1991)
11. "Civilized Man" – 3:56 (Richard Feldman, Pat Robinson) (1984)
12. "With a Little Help from My Friends" (Live at Memorial Auditorium, Lowell, Mass., 5 October 1989.) – 9:27 (John Lennon, Paul McCartney) (Previously released on Joe Cocker Live, 1990)

== Personnel ==
- Joe Cocker – lead vocals
- Jennifer Warnes – lead vocals (track 4)
- Stewart Levine – producer
- Abraham Laboriel – bass (track 4)
- Leon "Ndugu" Chancler – drums (track 4)
- Louis Shelton – guitar (track 4)
- Bobby Lyle – keyboards (track 4)
- Robbie Buchanan – keyboards (track 4)
- Paulinho da Costa – percussion (track 4)

== Charts ==
Chart (1992)	Peak position
German Albums (Offizielle Top 100)	7
Swedish Albums (Sverigetopplistan)	9
Swiss Albums (Schweizer Hitparade)	13

Chart (1993)	Peak position
Austrian Albums (Ö3 Austria)	11
Dutch Albums (Album Top 100)	12
Norwegian Albums (VG-lista)	4

Chart (1997)	Peak position
Belgian Albums (Ultratop Flanders)	37

Chart (1998)	Peak position
Belgian Albums (Ultratop Wallonia)	40
New Zealand Albums (RMNZ)	10

Chart (2015)	Peak position
Australian Albums (ARIA)	70

== Certifications ==
Region	Certification	Certified units/sales
Australia (ARIA)	2× Platinum	140,000^{^}
Austria (IFPI Austria)	Platinum	50,000^{*}
Belgium (BRMA)	Gold	25,000^{*}
Brazil (Pro-Música Brasil)	Gold	100,000^{*}
France (SNEP)	3× Platinum	900,000^{*}
Germany (BVMI)	Platinum	500,000^{^}
Netherlands (NVPI)	Platinum	100,000^{^}
New Zealand (RMNZ)	Gold	7,500^{^}
Poland (ZPAV)	Gold	50,000^{*}
Sweden (GLF)	Gold	50,000^{^}
Switzerland (IFPI Switzerland)	Platinum	50,000^{^}
^{*} Sales figures based on certification alone.^{^} Shipments figures based on certification alone.
