= T. M. Stevens =

American bass guitarist (1951–2024)

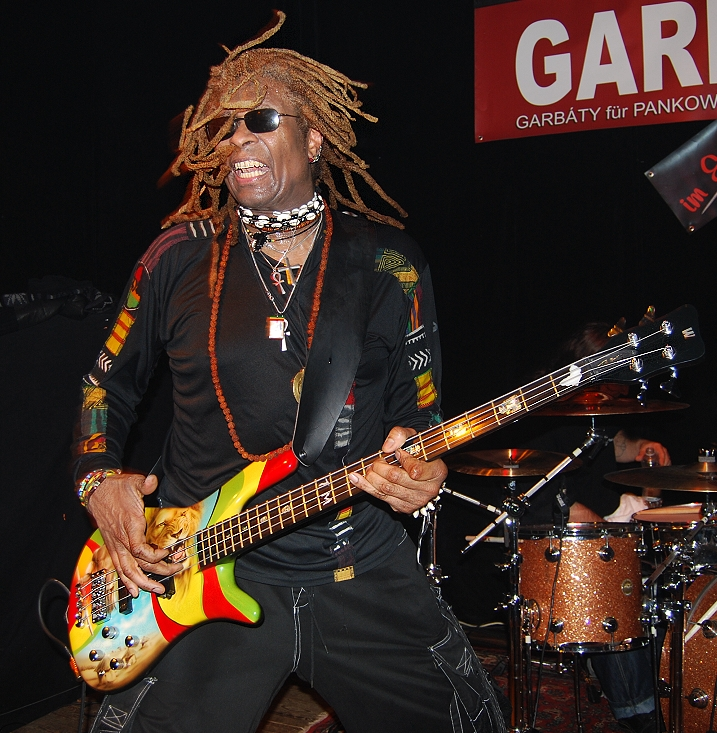
- T.M. Stevens performing with Stevie Salas in 2010

Background information
- Also known as: Shaka Zulu
- Born: Thomas Michael Stevens; July 28, 1951; New York City, U.S.
- Died: March 10, 2024 (aged 72)
- Occupation: Musician
- Instrument: Bass guitar
- Formerly of: Space Cadets; the Pretenders; Vai; Out of Control; Illegal Aliens; The Boombasstics; Temple of Soul

Thomas Michael Stevens (July 28, 1951 – March 10, 2024) was an American bass guitarist from New York City. He recorded and toured with an array of rock, R&B, and pop acts as a session musician and also worked as a solo performer.

== Career ==
=== Early recordings and solo work ===
Stevens, who sometimes went by the name Shaka Zulu, began his career playing bass in the group Space Cadets, with whom he released a self-titled album in 1981. Between 1986 and 1987, he was a member of the Pretenders, recording the album Get Close with them in 1986. In 1993, he joined Vai, a short-lived group formed by Steve Vai to record and promote his third studio album, Sex & Religion. The group also included Devin Townsend on vocals and Terry Bozzio on drums. In 1995, Stevens began recording his own material with the backing band Out of Control and released two albums, Boom (1995) and Sticky Wicked (1996). In 1997, he produced and arranged the album Black Night – Deep Purple Tribute According to New York, performing on seven of its eleven tracks. In 2000, Stevens recorded the album International Telephone with German drummer Marco Minnemann's group Illegal Aliens. The same year, he released Boomparty 2000 with the Boombasstics and in 2008, he issued Brothers in Arms with the group Temple of Soul.

=== Session work and touring ===
Stevens has recorded and toured with many artists, including Yoshiaki Masuo, James Brown, Nona Hendryx, Joe Cocker, Cyndi Lauper, Little Steven, Tina Turner, Narada Michael Walden, Taylor Dayne, Stevie Salas, and Billy Joel.

== Personal life and death ==
On September 16, 2017, Stevens' fellow musician and friend Ronny Drayton announced on his Facebook page that Stevens had advanced dementia and was living in a nursing home. Stevens died March 10, 2024, at the age of 72.

== Discography ==
=== Solo ===
Albums

- Boom (with Out of Control, 1995)
- Sticky Wicked (with Out of Control, 1996)
- Black Night – Deep Purple Tribute According to New York (1997)
- Radioactive (1999)
- Shocka Zooloo (2001)
- Limousine Drive (Original Soundtrack) (2001)
- Africans in the Snow (2007)

=== with Space Cadets ===
- Space Cadets (1981)

=== with the Pretenders ===
- Get Close (1986)

=== with Vai ===
- Sex & Religion (1993)

=== with Illegal Aliens ===
- International Telephone (2000)

=== with the Boombasstics ===
- Boomparty 2000 (2000)

=== with Temple of Soul ===
- Brothers in Arms (2008)

=== Other ===
- Sherry Winston featuring Eric Gale, Buddy Williams & T.M. Stevens – Do It for Love (1986)
- Travers & Appice featuring: T.M. Stevens – Live (2005)

== Selected recordings with other artists ==
- Yoshiaki Masuo – Good Morning (1979)
- Yoshiaki Masuo – Sunshine Avenue (1979)
- Narada Michael Walden – Dance of Life (1979)
- Yoshiaki Masuo – Masuo Live (1980)
- David Sancious – Just As I Thought (1980)
- Yoshiaki Masuo – Mellow Focus (1982)
- Lovebug Starski – House Rocker (1986)
- Billy Squier – Enough Is Enough (1986)
- Gregory Abbott – Shake You Down (1986)
- James Brown – Gravity (1986)
- Nona Hendryx – Female Trouble (1987)
- Joe Cocker – Unchain My Heart (1987)
- Little Steven – Freedom – No Compromise (1987)
- Darlene Love – Paint Another Picture (1988)
- Taylor Dayne – Can't Fight Fate (1989)
- Cyndi Lauper – Night to Remember (1989)
- Joe Cocker – One Night of Sin (1989)
- Tina Turner – Foreign Affair (1989)
- Joe Cocker – Joe Cocker Live (1990)
- Riot – The Privilege of Power (1990)
- Joe Cocker – Night Calls (1991)
- Curtis Stigers – Curtis Stigers (1991)
- Taylor Dayne – Soul Dancing (1993)
- Billy Joel – River of Dreams (1993)
- Stevie Salas – Stevie Salas Presents: The Electric Pow Wow (1993)
- hide – Hide Your Face (1994)
- The Uptown Horns – The Uptown Horns Revue (1994)
- Curtis Stigers – Time Was (1995)
- Joe Grushecky and the Houserockers – American Babylon (1995)
- Jean-Paul Bourelly – Tribute to Jimi (1995)
- Cissy Houston – He Leadeth Me (1997)
- Nicklebag – Mas Feedback (1997)
- Stacy Lattisaw – The Very Best of Stacy Lattisaw (1998)
- Space Cadets – Da Bomb (1999)
- 2Pac – The Rose That Grew from Concrete (2000)
- Aina – Days of Rising Doom: The Metal Opera (2003)
- Victor Wooten – Soul Circus (2005)
- Travers & Appice – It Takes a Lot of Balls (2004)
- Trystette – The Deepest Part of My Soul (2006)
- The Headhunters – On Top: Live in Europe (2008)
