= Joe Cocker Live =

Live album by Joe Cocker
- Released: May 1990
- Recorded: 5 October 1989
- Venue: Memorial Auditorium (Lowell, Massachusetts)
- Studios: A&M Studios and The Grey Room (Hollywood, California) Sound Design (Santa Barbara, California) Bearsville Studios (Bearsville, New York) The Hit Factory (New York City, New York)
- Genre: Rock
- Length: 72:51
- Label: Capitol
- Producers: Michael Barbiero; Michael Lang; Steve Thompson

Joe Cocker chronology
One Night of Sin (1989)	Joe Cocker Live (1990)	Night Calls (1991)

Professional ratings
Review scores
Source	Rating
AllMusic	3/5 stars

Joe Cocker Live is a live album by English singer Joe Cocker, released in 1990. It was recorded live 5 October 1989 at Memorial Auditorium in Lowell, Massachusetts with the exception of the last two tracks which were recorded in the studio. The album was re-released in 2011 under the title Joe Cocker's Greatest Hits Live.

== Track listing ==
1. "Feelin' Alright" (Dave Mason) – 4:43
2. "Shelter Me" (Nick Di Stefano) – 4:26
3. "Hitchcock Railway" (Donald Lewis Dunn, Tony McCashen) – 3:58
4. "Up Where We Belong" (Jack Nitzsche, Buffy Sainte-Marie, Will Jennings) – 4:35
5. "Guilty" (Randy Newman) – 2:40
6. "You Can Leave Your Hat On" (Randy Newman) – 4:20
7. "When the Night Comes" (Bryan Adams, Jim Vallance, Diane Warren) – 4:52
8. "Unchain My Heart" (Robert W. "Bobby" Sharp Jr.) – 5:50
9. "With a Little Help from My Friends" (John Lennon, Paul McCartney) – 9:13
10. "You Are So Beautiful" (Billy Preston, Bruce Fisher) – 4:23
11. "The Letter" (Wayne Carson Thompson) – 4:31
12. "She Came In Through the Bathroom Window" (Paul McCartney) – 2:30
13. "High Time We Went" (Joe Cocker, Chris Stainton) – 7:58
14. "What Are You Doing With a Fool Like Me" (Diane Warren) – 4:51 – Studio bonus track
15. "Living in the Promiseland" (David Lynn Jones) – 3:55 – Studio bonus track

== Personnel ==
The band

- Joe Cocker – lead vocals
- Jeff Levine – keyboards
- Chris Stainton – keyboards
- Deric Dyer – keyboards, percussion, tenor saxophone (including solos), horn arrangements
- Phil Grande – lead guitar
- Keith Mack – rhythm guitar, guitar solo on "The Letter"
- T.M. Stevens – bass, backing vocals
- Steve Holley – drums
- Crystal Taliefero – percussion, backing vocals
- Doreen Chanter – backing vocals
- Maxine Green – backing vocals, duet on "Up Where We Belong"

The Memphis Horns (Tracks 6, 8, 9 & 11-13)

- Andrew Love – tenor saxophone
- Gary Buho Gazaway – trombone, trumpet
- Wayne Jackson – trombone, trumpet, trumpet solo on "The Letter"

Studio Tracks (14 & 15):

- Joe Cocker – vocals
- Earl Slick – guitars
- Kenny Richards – drums
- Bashiri Johnson – percussion
- Tawatha Agee – backing vocals
- Vaneese Thomas – backing vocals
- Fonzi Thornton – backing vocals

== Production ==
Live recordings

- Michael Lang – producer
- LeMobile – audio recording unit
- Guy Charbonneau – engineer
- David Gallo – assistant engineer
- David Roberts – assistant engineer
- Chris Lord-Alge – mixing
- Mark Harder – assistant mix engineer
- Maicajah Ryan – assistant mix engineer

Studio recordings

- Michael Barbiero – producer, engineer, mixing
- Steve Thompson – producer, mixing
- Ed Goodreau – assistant engineer
- Chris Lord-Alge – additional engineer

Album credits

- Howie Weinberg – album mastering at Masterdisk (New York, NY)
- Jeffrey Fey – art direction
- Tommy Steele – art direction
- Peter Nomura – design
- Herb Ritts – photography
- Henry Diltz – concert photography
- Better Music – management

== Charts ==
=== Weekly charts ===
Chart (1990)	Peak position
Australian Albums (ARIA)	17
Austrian Albums (Ö3 Austria)	2
Canadian Albums (RPM)	46
Dutch Albums (Album Top 100)	21
German Albums (Offizielle Top 100)	5
Hungarian Albums (MAHASZ)	22
New Zealand Albums (RMNZ)	2
Norwegian Albums (VG-lista)	11
Swedish Albums (Sverigetopplistan)	33
Swiss Albums (Schweizer Hitparade)	4
US Billboard 200	95

=== Year-end charts ===
Chart (1990)	Position
Austrian Albums (Ö3 Austria)	15
German Albums (Offizielle Top 100)	29
New Zealand Albums (RMNZ)	15
Swiss Albums (Schweizer Hitparade)	9

== Certifications ==
Region	Certification	Certified units/sales
Australia (ARIA)	Gold	35,000^{^}
Austria (IFPI Austria)	Platinum	50,000^{*}
France (SNEP)	Gold	100,000^{*}
Germany (BVMI)	Platinum	500,000^{^}
Netherlands (NVPI)	Platinum	100,000^{^}
New Zealand (RMNZ)	Platinum	15,000^{^}
Spain (Promusicae)	Platinum	100,000^{^}
Switzerland (IFPI Switzerland)	Platinum	50,000^{^}
^{*} Sales figures based on certification alone.^{^} Shipments figures based on certification alone.
