= No Ordinary World =

Studio album by Joe Cocker
- Released: 8 October 1999
- Recorded: 1998−1999
- Studio: Metropolis Studio, Battery Studios, Area21, Brittania Row Studios, Olympic Studio 1 and Nomis Studios (London, UK); Studio Twin (Paris, France); Record Plant (Los Angeles, California, USA)
- Length: 1:01:15 (US release); 52:11 (European release)
- Label: Parlophone (Europe); Eagle (US)
- Producer: Steve Power; Pete Smith; Peter-John Vettese; Jean-Jacques Goldman

Joe Cocker chronology
The Anthology (1999)	No Ordinary World (1999)	Respect Yourself (2002)

Alternative cover

Professional ratings
Review scores
Source	Rating
AllMusic	2.5/5 stars

No Ordinary World is the seventeenth studio album by English singer Joe Cocker, released on 8 October 1999 in Europe and on 22 August 2000 in USA. The US edition of the album features two bonus tracks and has different cover artwork. Notable songs on the album include a cover of Leonard Cohen's "First We Take Manhattan" and "She Believes in Me" co-written by Bryan Adams, who had also provided backing vocals for the song.

== Track listing ==
1. "First We Take Manhattan" – 3:44 (Leonard Cohen)
2. "Different Roads" – 4:58 (Stephen Allen Davis, Steve DuBerry)
3. "My Father's Son" – 4:29 (Graham Lyle, Conner Reeves)
4. "While You See a Chance" – 3:51 (Will Jennings, Steve Winwood)
5. "She Believes in Me" – 4:44 (Bryan Adams, Eliot Kennedy)
6. "No Ordinary World" – 3:52 (Lars Anderson, Stephen Allen Davis)
7. "Where Would I Be Now" – 5:27 (Michael McDonald, Tony Joe White)
8. "Ain't Gonna Cry Again" – 4:06 (Peter Cox, Peter-John Vettese)
9. "Soul Rising" – 3:57 (Peter Cox, Graham Gouldman, Peter-John Vettese)
10. "Naked Without You" – 4:31 (Rick Nowels, Andrew Roachford, Billy Steinberg)
11. "Love to Lean On" – 4:17 (Steve Diamond, Wayne Kirkpatrick)
12. "On My Way Home" – 4:13 (Jean-Jacques Goldman, Michael Jones)
13. "Lie to Me" – 4:01 (J. McCabe, David Z)
14. "Love Made a Promise" – 5:03 (Paul Brady, Mark Nevin)

Tracks 13 & 14 available only on US edition of the album. In Europe both songs were only released as B-sides to different singles.

== Personnel ==
- Joe Cocker – vocals
- Spike Edney – synthesizers (1, 10)
- Chris Elliot – acoustic piano (1, 2), Rhodes electric piano (2), clavinet (3), Wurlitzer electric piano (3)
- John Savannah – Hammond organ (1–3, 7, 10), electric piano (2), acoustic piano (6)
- Jason Rebello – acoustic piano (3, 7, 10), clavinet (3), electric piano (7)
- Peter-John Vettese – keyboards (4, 8, 9), acoustic piano (4, 8, 9), Hammond organ (4, 8, 9), melodica (4, 9), programming (4, 8, 9)
- Mark Evans – additional programming (4)
- Peter Gordeno – keyboards (5, 11)
- C. J. Vanston – keyboards (5, 11), Rhodes electric piano (5), synth strings (5, 7), synth percussion (5), synth vibes (10), clavinet (11), Hammond organ (11)
- David Clayton – synthesizers (6)
- Jean-Jacques Goldman – keyboards (12), acoustic guitar (12), backing vocals (12)
- Tim Pierce – electric guitar (1, 3, 10)
- Steve McEwan – electric guitar (1, 3, 6, 7), acoustic guitar (2, 7)
- Steve Power – electric guitar (1)
- Melvin Duffy – pedal steel guitar (1, 6, 7)
- Billy Lang – electric guitar (2), acoustic guitar (6)
- Adam Seymour – electric guitar (2, 3, 10), acoustic guitar (10)
- Robbie McIntosh – guitars (4, 8, 9), electric guitar (6)
- Michael Thompson – guitars (5, 11)
- Patrice Tison – guitars (12)
- Dave Catlin-Birch – bass (1, 2, 7)
- Neil Stubenhaus – bass (1–3, 5, 10, 11)
- Neil Harland – bass (4, 9)
- Mark Smith – bass (6)
- Guy Delacroix – bass (12)
- Jeremy Stacey – drums (1–4, 6–10)
- John Robinson – drums (5, 11)
- Christopher Deschamps – drums (12)
- Andy Duncan – percussion (1, 2, 7, 10), drum programming (6)
- Chris Cameron – string arrangements (2, 6, 10)
- Richard Niles – string arrangements (4, 9)
- Gavyn Wright – string conductor (2, 6, 10)
- Mary Carewe – backing vocals (1–3, 6, 7, 10)
- Helen Hampton – backing vocals (1–3, 6, 7, 10)
- Katie Kissoon – backing vocals (1–3, 6, 7, 10)
- Bryan Adams – backing vocals (5)
- Natalie Jackson – backing vocals (5, 11)
- Mortonette Jenkins – backing vocals (5, 11)
- Marlena Jeter – backing vocals (5, 11)
- Tommy Blaize – backing vocals (8, 9)
- Lance Ellington – backing vocals (8, 9)
- Keith Murrell – backing vocals (8, 9)
- Michael Jones – backing vocals (12)
- Horn section on "My Father's Son":
  - Steve Sidwell – trumpet
  - Neil Sidwell – trombone
  - Chris White – tenor and baritone saxes

== Production ==
- Joe Cocker – executive producer
- Roger Davies – executive producer, management
- Steve Power – producer (1–3, 6, 7, 10, 13, 14)
- Peter-John Vettese – producer (4, 8, 9)
- Pete Smith – producer (5, 11)
- Jean-Jacques Goldman – producer (12)
- Norman Moore – art direction, design
- Greg Gorman – photography
- Craig Logan – management
- Ray Neapolitan – management
- Fran Peters – management
- Gillian Zali – management

Technical credits

- Matt Tait – engineer (1–3, 6, 7, 10, 13, 14)
- Andy Haller – overdub engineer (1–3, 10), engineer (5, 11)
- James Brumby – Pro Tools engineer (1–3, 6, 7, 10, 13, 14)
- Richard Flack – Pro Tools engineer (1–3, 6, 7, 10, 13, 14)
- Steve Power – mixing (1–3, 6, 7, 10, 13, 14)
- Mark Evans – engineer (4, 8, 9)
- Mike Bigwood – string recording (4, 9)
- Peter-John Vettese – mixing (4, 8, 9)
- Chris Potter – vocal recording for Bryan Adams (5)
- Pete Smith – mixing (5, 11)
- Andy Scott – engineer (12)
- Matt Lawrence – assistant engineer (1–4, 6, 7, 10)
- Andy Hasegawa – assistant overdub engineer (1–3, 10), assistant engineer (5, 11)
- Matt White – mix assistant (1–3, 6, 7, 10)
- Mike Beckett – vocal recording assistant (5)
- Antoine Gaillet – assistant engineer (12)

== Charts ==
=== Weekly charts ===
Chart (1999)	Peak position
Austrian Albums (Ö3 Austria)	5
Belgian Albums (Ultratop Flanders)	7
Belgian Albums (Ultratop Wallonia)	11
Dutch Albums (Album Top 100)	30
French Albums (SNEP)	12
German Albums (Offizielle Top 100)	3
Norwegian Albums (VG-lista)	2
Scottish Albums (OCC)	93
Swedish Albums (Sverigetopplistan)	50
Swiss Albums (Schweizer Hitparade)	4
UK Albums (OCC)	63

=== Year-end charts ===
Chart (1999)	Position
Belgian Albums (Ultratop Flanders)	66
German Albums (Offizielle Top 100)	59

== Certifications ==
Region	Certification	Certified units/sales
Belgium (BRMA)	Gold	25,000^{*}
France (SNEP)	Gold	100,000^{*}
Germany (BVMI)	Platinum	500,000^{^}
Switzerland (IFPI Switzerland)	Gold	25,000^{^}
^{*} Sales figures based on certification alone.^{^} Shipments figures based on certification alone.
