= Hard Knocks (album) =

Studio album by Joe Cocker
- Released: 1 October 2010
- Recorded: 2009–2010
- Studios: Tracks 1–9 recorded at Emblem Studios (Calabasas, California); Track 10 recorded at Sound Stage Studios (Nashville, Tennessee)
- Genres: Rock, blues
- Length: 39:08
- Labels: Columbia (Europe); Savoy Label Group (USA)
- Producers: Matt Serletic; Tony Brown

Joe Cocker chronology
Hymn for My Soul (2007)	Hard Knocks (2010)	Icon (2011)

Singles from Hard Knocks
- 1. "Unforgiven" Released: 19 November 2010; 2. "Hard Knocks" Released: 4 October 2011

Professional ratings
Review scores
Source	Rating
AllMusic	3/5 stars
Record Collector	1/5 stars
Uncut	3/5 stars

Hard Knocks is the twenty-first and penultimate studio album by English singer Joe Cocker, released on 1 October 2010 by Columbia Records in Europe and 24 January 2012 in the US. It features nine new songs produced by Matt Serletic plus Cocker's version of the Dixie Chicks number "I Hope", which was produced by Tony Brown. Apart from a regular CD release, the album was also released on vinyl.

The album reached number 1 on Billboard's Independent Albums chart and number 2 on the same magazine's European Albums chart.

A Limited Live Edition (CD/DVD) version of the album was released in December 2010 in Europe with live tracks off the album recorded at Le Zenith in Paris in 2010.

== Track listing ==
1. "Hard Knocks" (Marc Broussard, Maxwell Aaron Ramsey, Shannon Sanders) – 3:24
2. "Get On" (Matt Serletic, Danny Myrick, Stephanie Bentley) – 3:28
3. "Unforgiven" (Mitch Allan, Kara DioGuardi, Nick Lachey, Dave Hodges) – 4:14
4. "The Fall" (Matt Serletic, Danny Myrick, Aimée Proal) – 3:49
5. "So It Goes" (Matt Serletic, Jeffrey Steele, Danny Myrick) – 3:21
6. "Runaway Train" (Ollie Marland) – 3:27
7. "Stay The Same" (Matt Serletic, Danny Myrick, Stephanie Bentley) – 4:39
8. "Thankful" (Matt Serletic, Kara DioGuardi) – 3:59
9. "So" (Chantal Kreviazuk, Thomas "Tawgs" Salter) – 3:56
10. "I Hope" (Keb' Mo', Martie Maguire, Natalie Maines, Emily Robison) – 4:46
11. "Forever Changed" – 3:51 – iTunes bonus track

Limited Live Edition additional tracks

1. "Hard Knocks" (Marc Broussard, Maxwell Aaron Ramsey, Shannon Sanders)
2. "Get On" (Matt Serletic, Danny Myrick, Stephanie Bentley)
3. "Unforgiven" (Mitch Allan, Kara DioGuardi, Nick Lachey, Dave Hodges)
4. "Thankful" (Matt Serletic, Kara DioGuardi)
5. "You Are So Beautiful" (Billy Preston, Bruce Fisher)
6. "With a Little Help from My Friends" (John Lennon, Paul McCartney)

== Personnel ==
- Joe Cocker – lead vocals
- Jamie Muhoberac – keyboards (1–9)
- Matt Serletic – keyboards (1–9), programming (1–9)
- Steve Nathan – Wurlitzer electric piano (10), synthesizers (10)
- Reese Wynans – acoustic piano (10)
- Ray Parker Jr. – guitars (1–9)
- Tim Pierce – guitars (1, 3, 4, 6, 8, 9)
- Joel Sherear – guitars (2, 5, 7)
- Tom Bukovac – electric guitar (10)
- Kenny Greenberg – electric guitar (10)
- Chris Chaney – bass (1–9)
- Glenn Worf – bass (10)
- Josh Freese – drums (1–3, 5, 7)
- Matt Chamberlain – drums (4, 9)
- Dorian Crozier – drums (6, 8)
- Greg Morrow – drums (10)
- Stevie Blacke – strings [violin, viola, and cello] (3, 4)
- Sheree Brown – backing vocals (1–4, 7, 9)
- Mabvuto Carpenter – backing vocals (1–4, 7, 9)
- Robyn Troup – backing vocals (1–4, 7, 9)
- Stephanie Bentley – backing vocals (7)
- Ashley Cleveland – backing vocals (10)
- Kim Keyes – backing vocals (10)
- Judson Spence – backing vocals (10)

Horn section on "Hard Knocks" and "Get On"

- Ron King – trumpet
- Jeff Babko – trombone
- Cleto Escobedo III – saxophones

Nine-person choir on "Thankful"

- Mabvuto Carpenter and Dorian Ford — male
- Jennifer Bailey, Kara DioGuardi, Erica Dowd, Nomisha Jackson, Renee Jackson, Robyn Troup and Niomisha Wilson — female

== Production ==
- Matt Serletic – producer (1–9)
- Tony Brown – producer (10)
- Mark Dobson – recording (1–9), Pro Tools editing (1–9)
- Doug Trantow – recording (1–9), Pro Tools editing (1–9)
- Jeff Balding – engineer (10)
- Alex Arias – additional engineer (1–9), assistant engineer (1–9), Pro Tools assistant (1–9)
- Mike Leisz – assistant engineer (1–9)
- Chris Lord-Alge – mixing at Mix LA (Los Angeles, California)
- Andrew Schubert – additional mixing
- Brad Townsend – additional mixing
- Keith Armstrong – mix assistant
- Nik Karpen – mix assistant
- Bob Ludwig – mastering at Gateway Mastering (Portland, Maine)
- Ryan Corey – art direction, design
- Jeri Heiden – art direction, design
- Olaf Heine – photography
- Miles Siggins – photography styling
- Roger Davies – management
- Ray Neapolitan – management
- Lisa Garrett – management
- Steven Manzano – management
- Irene Taylor – management

== Charts ==
Chart performance for Hard Knocks
Chart (2010–2012)	Peak position
Australian Albums	71
Austrian Albums (Ö3 Austria)	4
Belgian Albums (Ultratop Flanders)	32
Belgian Albums (Ultratop Wallonia)	41
Danish Albums (Hitlisten)	21
Dutch Albums (Album Top 100)	41
French Albums (SNEP)	34
German Albums (Offizielle Top 100)	1
Greek Albums (IFPI)	42
Hungarian Albums (MAHASZ)	20
Italian Albums (FIMI)	34
Polish Albums (ZPAV)	14
Portuguese Albums (AFP)	13
Spanish Albums (Promusicae)	86
Swedish Albums (Sverigetopplistan)	52
Swiss Albums (Schweizer Hitparade)	2
UK Albums (Official Charts)	61
US Independent Albums (Billboard)	48

=== Year-end charts ===
Chart (2010)	Position
German Albums Chart	31

== Certifications ==
Region	Certification	Certified units/sales
Germany (BVMI)	Platinum	200,000^{^}
Poland (ZPAV)	Gold	10,000^{*}
^{*} Sales figures based on certification alone.^{^} Shipments figures based on certification alone.

== Personnel ==
- Joe Cocker – vocals
- Ray Parker Jr., Tim Pierce, Joel Shearer, Tom Bukovac, Kenny Greenberg – guitar
- Chris Chaney, Glenn Worf – bass guitar
- Josh Freese, Dorian Crozier, Matt Chamberlain, Greg Morrow – drums
- Jamie Muhoberac – keyboards
- Matt Serletic – keyboards, programming
- Steve Nathan – synthesizer, Hammond organ, piano
- Jeff Babko – trombone
- Cleto Escobedo III – saxophone
- Ron King – trumpet
- Robyn Troup, Sherree Brown, Rich King, Mabvuto Carpenter, Stephanie Bentley, Kim Keys, Ashley Cleveland, Judson Spence – backing vocals
- Stevie Blacke – cello, violin, viola
