= Have a Little Faith (Joe Cocker album) =

- North American and Australian album cover

Studio album by Joe Cocker
- Released: 5 September 1994
- Studio: A&M Studios (Hollywood, California); Record Plant and Image Recording Studios (Los Angeles, California)
- Genre: Rock, pop
- Length: 56:58
- Label: 550; Capitol
- Producer: Roger Davies; Chris Lord-Alge

Joe Cocker chronology
The Best of Joe Cocker (1992)	Have a Little Faith (1994)	The Long Voyage Home (1995)

Alternative cover
- European and rest of the world album cover

Professional ratings
Review scores
Source	Rating
AllMusic	3/5 stars

Have a Little Faith is the fourteenth studio album by English singer Joe Cocker, released in 1994 in North America by 550 Music, a former unit of Sony Music Entertainment, and in the rest of the world by Capitol Records. The album peaked at number 9 on the UK Albums Chart. Music videos were released for "Let the Healing Begin", "Have a Little Faith in Me", "The Simple Things", "Summer in the City" and "Take Me Home", a duet with American singer Bekka Bramlett.

== Track listing ==
No.	Title	Writer(s)	Length
1.	"Let the Healing Begin"	Tony Joe White	5:12
2.	"Have a Little Faith in Me"	John Hiatt	4:40
3.	"The Simple Things"	Rick Neigher; Phil Roy; John Shanks	4:54
4.	"Summer in the City"	Steve Boone; Mark Sebastian; John Sebastian	4:10
5.	"The Great Divide"	Dillon O'Brian; JD Souther	3:33
6.	"Highway Highway"	Stephen Allen Davis	4:31
7.	"Too Cool"	Kye Fleming; Greg Sutton	4:45
8.	"Soul Time"	Will Jennings; Frankie Miller	4:35
9.	"Out of the Blue"	Robbie Robertson	3:45
10.	"Angeline"	Joe Cocker; Tony Joe White	4:30
11.	"Hell and Highwater"	John Miles; Michael Scanlon-Pratt	4:12
12.	"Standing Knee Deep in a River"	Bucky Jones; Dickey Lee; Bob McDill	4:09
13.	"Take Me Home" (duet with Bekka Bramlett)	John Capek; Marc Jordan; Steve Kipner	4:21

Note

- Track 11 not on North American versions of the album.

== Personnel ==
- Joe Cocker – vocals
- C. J. Vanston – acoustic piano (1, 8, 9, 13), organ (1, 2, 4, 5, 7, 8, 10–12), synthesizers (1, 2, 4–6, 9, 12, 13), string arrangements (1, 4, 6), keyboards (3), synth harmonica solo (3), percussion (3), horn arrangements (4, 7), vibraphone (7), synth horns (8, 11)
- Chris Stainton – Wurlitzer electronic piano (1, 4), acoustic piano (2, 5–7, 11, 12), organ (9), Rhodes electric piano (10)
- Tony Joe White – guitars (1, 10)
- Tim Pierce – guitar solo (1, 10), guitars (2–7, 9–12), dobro (11)
- Michael Thompson – guitars (8, 13)
- Bob Feit – bass (1, 2, 4–13)
- Abraham Laboriel – bass (3)
- Jack Bruno – drums
- Lenny Castro – percussion (1, 2, 4, 7, 10, 11)
- Don Shelton – saxophone (4, 7)
- Ernie Watts – alto sax solo (5, 13)
- Alexander Iles – trombone (4, 7)
- Rick Baptist – trumpet (4, 7)
- Wayne Bergeron – trumpet (4, 7)
- Dick Marx – orchestrations and conductor (1, 4, 6)
- Israel Baker – concertmaster (1, 4, 6)
- Alexandra Brown – backing vocals (1, 2)
- Mortonette Jenkins – backing vocals (1, 2)
- Marlena Jeter – backing vocals (1, 2)
- Joey Diggs – backing vocals (3, 8, 12, 13)
- Lamont Van Hook – backing vocals (3, 8, 12, 13)
- Fred White – backing vocals (3, 8, 12, 13)
- Carmen Twillie – backing vocals (4)
- Maxine Waters Willard – backing vocals (4, 11)
- Julie Tillman Waters – backing vocals (4, 11)
- Steve Kipner – backing vocals (13)
- Bekka Bramlett – vocals (13)

== Production ==
- Joe Cocker – executive producer
- Roger Davies – producer, management
- Chris Lord-Alge – producer, recording, mixing
- Craig Brock – engineer
- Ken Villeneuve – engineer
- Ben Wallach – engineer
- Randy Wine – engineer
- Doug Sax – mastering at The Mastering Lab (Hollywood, California)
- Ray Neapolitan – production coordinator
- Norman Moore – art direction, design
- Greg Gorman – cover photography
- Frank W. Ockenfels 3 – inlay photography

== Charts ==
=== Weekly charts ===
Chart (1994)	Peak position
Austrian Albums (Ö3 Austria)	2
Dutch Albums (Album Top 100)	2
German Albums (Offizielle Top 100)	3
New Zealand Albums (RMNZ)	15
Norwegian Albums (VG-lista)	11
Swedish Albums (Sverigetopplistan)	7
Swiss Albums (Schweizer Hitparade)	2
UK Albums (Official Charts)	9

Chart (1995)	Peak position
Australian Albums (ARIA)	23

=== Year-end charts ===
Chart (1994)	Position
Austrian Albums (Ö3 Austria)	30
Dutch Albums (Album Top 100)	27
German Albums (Offizielle Top 100)	30
Swiss Albums (Schweizer Hitparade)	24

Chart (1995)	Position
German Albums (Offizielle Top 100)	76

== Certifications ==
Region	Certification	Certified units/sales
Austria (IFPI Austria)	Gold	25,000^{*}
France (SNEP)	2× Gold	200,000^{*}
Germany (BVMI)	Platinum	500,000^{^}
Netherlands (NVPI)	Platinum	100,000^{^}
New Zealand (RMNZ)	Gold	7,500^{^}
Poland (ZPAV)	Gold	50,000^{*}
Switzerland (IFPI Switzerland)	Platinum	50,000^{^}
United Kingdom (BPI)	Gold	100,000^{^}
^{*} Sales figures based on certification alone.^{^} Shipments figures based on certification alone.
