= Vance Arnold & The Avengers =

Vance Arnold and the Avengers - Live at the Esquire Club

Live album by Joe Cocker
- Released: 1999
- Recorded: 1963 at The Esquire Club, Sheffield
- Genre: Rock
- Label: Voiceprint
- Producer: Don Hale

Vance Arnold and the Avengers - Live at the Esquire Club Recorded live in Sheffield, England, 1963.

A live recording that lay dormant for over 30 years sheds light on Joe Cocker's early career when he was an apprentice gas-fitter, at the time performing as Vance Arnold & The Avengers. The recording was made live on stage with a reel to reel tape by his first manager (The Mad Hatter) Terry Thornton, owner of the Esquire Club, Leadmill Road, Sheffield.

== Track listing ==
1. "Sixteen Tons" (Merle Travis)- 2:57
2. "Money (That's What I Want)" (Barrett Strong)
3. "Georgia on My Mind" (Hoagy Carmichael, Stuart Gorrell)
4. "You Win Again" (Hank Williams)
5. "Ride On Josephine" (Bo Diddley)
6. "You'd Better Move On" (Arthur Alexander)
7. "I'm Free" (Unknown)
