= With a Little Help from My Friends (Joe Cocker album) =

- UK vinyl variant of standard artwork

Studio album by Joe Cocker
- Released: 23 April 1969
- Recorded: Early 1968
- Studios: Olympic Studios and Trident Studios, London
- Genres: Blues rock; soul
- Length: 40:40
- Labels: Regal Zonophone (UK); A&M (US)
- Producer: Denny Cordell

Joe Cocker chronology
With a Little Help from My Friends (1969)	Joe Cocker! (1969)

With a Little Help from My Friends is the debut studio album by the English singer-songwriter Joe Cocker, released in late April 1969. It was certified gold in the US by the RIAA and peaked at number 35 on the Billboard 200. In the UK, the album charted in May 1972 at number 29 on the UK Albums Chart when it was re-released as a double pack with Cocker's second LP Joe Cocker!.

The title track was written by John Lennon and Paul McCartney and originally performed by the Beatles on the 1967 album Sgt. Pepper's Lonely Hearts Club Band; it has been inducted into the Grammy Award Hall of Fame. Cocker's version was the theme song to the television series The Wonder Years from 1988 to 1993.

In 2015, the Audio Fidelity Company released a limited reissue of the album in hybrid SACD format as a tribute to Cocker.

== Reception ==
Professional ratings
Review scores
Source	Rating
Allmusic	4/5 stars
Rolling Stone	(favourable)

With a Little Help from My Friends met with a favourable review from Rolling Stone's John Mendelsohn. Mendelsohn stated that "[Joe] Cocker has assimilated the [Ray] Charles influence to the point where his feeling for what he is singing cannot really be questioned. And, in answer to the question of why someone should listen to Cocker when there is Charles to listen to – how many times in recent years has the latter applied himself to such exceptional modern material [...] or such contemporary [Bob] Dylan... ?" He also stated that "[Denny] Cordell's success in fusing a consistently marvelous backing unit out of America's premier studio soul singers and England's most famous rock musicians and delicate egos cannot be exaggerated." He concluded that "it's a triumph all around. And the thought of Cocker's next album [...] is an exceptionally pleasant one." In The New York Times, Robert Christgau wrote:

With a Little Help From My Friends is the major triumph of rock interpretation thus far. Cocker's material leans to the conventional ... but his conception and performance, as well as Denny Cordell's production, are always audacious. His transformation of "Bye Bye Blackbird" and "A Little Help from My Friends" from light-hearted ditties into wails of human need succeeds perfectly, and his version of "Feelin' Alright" is not only better than Three Dog Night's but better than the original, by Dave Mason and Traffic. If that means Cocker is the best singer in England, well—overlook Mick Jagger and it's possible, even likely. His voice is very strong, influenced by Ray Charles, and he has no inhibitions about using it. All of his inhibitions came before the fact, in the immense care that went into each track ... Cocker's affection for rock is uniquely personalized. He is gruff and vulgar, perhaps a touch too self-involved, but his steady strength rectifies his excesses. He is the best of the male rock interpreters, as good in his way as Janis Joplin is in hers.

A retrospective review from AllMusic's Bruce Eder was fairly positive. Eder stated that the album "holds up extraordinarily well across four decades, the singer's performance bolstered by some very sharp playing, [...] It's Cocker's voice, a soulful rasp of an instrument [...] that carries this album and makes "Change in Louise", "Feeling Alright", "Just Like a Woman", "I Shall Be Released", and even "Bye Bye Blackbird" into profound listening experiences." He concluded that "the surprises in the arrangements, tempo, and approaches taken help make this an exceptional album. Tracks like "Just Like a Woman," with its soaring gospel organ above a lean textured acoustic and light electric accompaniment, and the guitar-dominated rendition of "Don't Let Me Be Misunderstood" [...] all help make this an exceptional listening experience."

== Track listing ==
Side one
No.	Title	Writer(s)	Length
1.	"Feeling Alright"	Dave Mason	4:12
2.	"Bye Bye Blackbird"	Ray Henderson, Mort Dixon	3:28
3.	"Change in Louise"	Joe Cocker, Chris Stainton	3:22
4.	"Marjorine"	Cocker, Stainton	2:38
5.	"Just Like a Woman"	Bob Dylan	5:18

Side two
No.	Title	Writer(s)	Length
6.	"Do I Still Figure in Your Life?"	Pete Dello	3:59
7.	"Sandpaper Cadillac"	Cocker, Stainton	3:18
8.	"Don't Let Me Be Misunderstood"	Gloria Caldwell, Sol Marcus, Bennie Benjamin	4:41
9.	"With a Little Help from My Friends"	Lennon–McCartney	5:08
10.	"I Shall Be Released"	Dylan	4:36
Total length:			40:40

Outtakes released as B-sides
No.	Title	Writer(s)	Length
1.	"The New Age of the Lily"	Cocker, Stainton	2:15
2.	"Something's Coming On"	Cocker, Stainton	2:15

- Note: the timings on the album sleeve (and reissues) have 3 tracks incorrect by about 1 minute: Marjorine (3:38), With a Little Help from My Friends (4:05) and I Shall Be Released (3:38). The above timings are correct.

== Personnel ==
- Joe Cocker – vocals
- David Cohen – guitar (track 1)
- Tony Visconti – guitar (track 2)
- Jimmy Page – guitar (tracks 2, 4, 5, 7 & 9)
- Henry McCullough – guitar (tracks 3, 6, 8 & 10)
- Albert Lee – guitar (track 4)
- Chris Stainton – piano (tracks 2, 3, 4 & 7), organ (tracks 2 & 7), bass guitar (tracks 2–10)
- Tommy Eyre – piano (track 5), organ (tracks 8 & 9)
- Artie Butler – piano (track 1)
- Matthew Fisher – organ (track 5)
- Steve Winwood – organ (tracks 6 & 10)
- Carol Kaye – bass guitar (track 1)
- Paul Humphrey – drums (track 1)
- Clem Cattini – drums (tracks 2, 4 & 7)
- Mike Kellie – drums (tracks 3, 6 & 10)
- B. J. Wilson – drums (tracks 5 & 9)
- Kenny Slade – drums (track 8)
- Laudir de Oliveira – tumba, congas, maracas (track 1)
- Brenda Holloway – backing vocals (track 1)
- Patrice Holloway – backing vocals (track 1)
- Merry Clayton – backing vocals (track 1)
- Madeline Bell – backing vocals (tracks 2, 6 & 9)
- Rosetta Hightower – backing vocals (tracks 2 & 9)
- Sue Wheetman – backing vocals (tracks 3, 6, 9 & 10)
- Sunny Wheetman – backing vocals (tracks 3, 6, 9 & 10)
- Nick Harrison – string arrangement (track 10)

== Production ==
- Denny Cordell – producer
- Tony Visconti – mixing engineer
- Tom Wilkes – album design
- Martin Keeley – front cover photography
- Eric Hays – back cover photography
- Herb Greene – back cover photography

== Charts ==
Chart (1969)	Peak position
Canada Top Albums/CDs (RPM)	40
US Billboard 200	35

Chart (1972)	Peak position
UK Albums (Official Charts)	29

Chart (1992)	Peak position
German Albums (Offizielle Top 100)	82

== Certifications ==
Region	Certification	Certified units/sales
United States (RIAA)	Gold	500,000^{^}
^{^} Shipments figures based on certification alone.
