= Oren Waters =

American vocalist

Oren Waters is an American vocalist best known for his work with the backup singing group The Waters, his siblings: Luther, Maxine and Julia. As an ensemble, Waters has been a part of 260 gold and over 100 platinum albums with artists including Johnny Rivers, Dan Fogelberg, Neil Diamond, Patti La Belle, Paul Simon, Pet Shop Boys, Helen Reddy, Don Henley, Glenn Frey, John Fogerty, Janet and Michael Jackson. He has also provided the vocals for TV themes such as "Baretta's Theme", and "Movin' on Up" for The Jeffersons.

Waters has also contributed to movie soundtracks including Happy Feet, The Lion King, The Matrix, Saint Seiya: The Legend of Crimson Youth, Avatar and American Gangster. He currently teaches vocal performance at the California College of Music.

Waters lost his home in the Eaton Fire in January 2025, and so did his sister Maxine. The home of his sister Julia was not harmed.

== The Waters ==
In 2013, the group featured in the film 20 Feet from Stardom (Academy Award for Best Documentary Feature at the 86th Academy Awards). The movie is dedicated to the role of background vocalists from an R&B background.

== Filmography ==
- Brother Bear - Singer/Additional Voices
