= Luxury You Can Afford =

Studio album by Joe Cocker
- Released: August 1978
- Studios: Criteria, Miami, Florida; Sea-Saint, New Orleans, Louisiana; Muscle Shoals, Sheffield, Alabama; Elektra, Los Angeles, California
- Genres: Blues rock, soft rock, pop rock
- Label: Asylum
- Producer: Allen Toussaint

Joe Cocker chronology
Joe Cocker's Greatest Hits (1977)	Luxury You Can Afford (1978)	Sheffield Steel (1982)

Luxury You Can Afford is the seventh studio album by English singer Joe Cocker, released in 1978 on Asylum Records, his only release for that label.

== Critical reception ==
Professional ratings
Review scores
Source	Rating
AllMusic	3/5 stars
Christgau's Record Guide	C+
High Fidelity	(favourable)

In 1994, The Independent wrote that Cocker "reveals the self-disgust at ['A Whiter Shade of Pale']'s heart ... his rawness is thrown into stark relief by Allen Toussaint's too-slick production."

== Track listing ==
1. "Fun Time" (Allen Toussaint) – 2:39
2. "Watching the River Flow" (Bob Dylan) – 3:16
3. "Boogie Baby" (Phil Driscoll) – 3:51
4. "A Whiter Shade of Pale" (Gary Brooker, Keith Reid, Matthew Fisher) – 5:27
5. "I Can't Say No" (John Bettis, Daniel Moore) – 2:51
6. "Southern Lady" (Phil Driscoll) – 3:16
7. "I Know (You Don't Want Me No More)" (Barbara George) – 3:08
8. "What You Did to Me Last Night" (Bettye Crutcher) – 3:28
9. "Lady Put the Light Out" (Guy Fletcher, Doug Flett) – 4:46
10. "Wasted Years" (Phil Driscoll) – 4:49
11. "I Heard It Through the Grapevine" (Norman Whitfield, Barrett Strong) – 4:29

== Personnel ==
- Joe Cocker – lead vocals, harmonica (5)
- Barry Beckett – acoustic piano (1, 4, 7, 11), clavinet (1), Fender Rhodes (3), Minimoog (3, 4), ARP String Ensemble (3-4), Hammond organ (3)
- Richard Tee – acoustic piano (2, 5-6, 8-9), Fender Rhodes (10)
- Allen Toussaint – horn and string arrangements (1, 9), Fender Rhodes (2-3, 8), Hammond organ (5-6), clavinet (5)
- Randy McCormick – Fender Rhodes (4, 7), clavinet (11)
- Billy Preston – Hammond organ (4, 11)
- Dr. John – Fender Rhodes (6), Hammond organ (8)
- Donny Hathaway – Fender Rhodes (8), acoustic piano (10)
- Mitch Chakour – guitar (1), acoustic piano (3)
- Cliff Goodwin – guitar (1, 3)
- Pete Carr – lead guitar (2, 11), slide guitar (2), guitar (3)
- Cornell Dupree – guitar (2, 5-6, 8–10)
- Larry Byrom – lead guitar (4, 7)
- Jimmy Johnson – rhythm guitar (4, 7, 11)
- Joey Murcia – guitar (5, 10)
- George Terry – guitar (5)
- Howie Hersh – bass guitar (1, 3)
- Chuck Rainey – bass guitar (2, 5-6, 8–10)
- David Hood – bass guitar (4, 7)
- Rick Danko – bass guitar (11)
- John Riley – drums (1, 3)
- Steve Gadd – drums (2, 5, 8–10)
- Roger Hawkins – drums (4, 7, 11)
- Bernard Purdie – drums (6, 8)
- Hank Crawford – alto saxophone (1, 8)
- Leroy Cooper – baritone saxophone (1, 8)
- Ronald Eades – baritone saxophone (2, 5, 7-8, 11)
- Gary Brown – tenor sax solo (1)
- David "Fathead" Newman – tenor saxophone (1, 9)
- Harvey Thompson – tenor sax solo (2, 9), tenor saxophone (5, 7-8, 11)
- Bobby Keys – tenor sax solo (3)
- Charles Rose – trombone (2, 5, 7-8, 11)
- Marcus Belgrave – trumpet (1, 9)
- Phillip Guilbeau – trumpet (1, 9)
- Harrison Calloway Jr. – trumpet (2, 5, 7-8, 11), horn arrangements (2, 5, 7-8, 11)
- Wayne Jackson – trumpet (2, 5, 7-8, 11)
- Clyde Kerr Jr. – trumpet solo (7)
- Clydie King – backing vocals
- Ann Lang – backing vocals
- Mona Lisa Young – backing vocals

Production

- Producers – Barry Beckett and Allen Toussaint
- Engineers – Bill Gazecki, Skip Godwin, Gregg Hamm, Jerry Masters, Steve Melton and Alex Sadkin.
- Assistant Engineers – Bob Gore, Roberta Grace, Sheila Taylor and David Yates.
- Recorded at Criteria Studios (Miami, Florida); Sea-Saint Studios (New Orleans, Louisiana); Muscle Shoals Sound Studios (Sheffield, Alabama); Elektra Sound Recorders (Los Angeles, CA).
- Mixing on Tracks 2, 5, 6, 7 & 10 – Barry Beckett
- Mastered by Terry Dunavan
- Mixed and Mastered at Elektra Sound Recorders.
- Design – Johnny Lee
- Photography – Gary Heery

== Chart performance ==
Year	Chart	Position
1978	Australia	12
1978	New Zealand	25
1978	Netherlands	47
1978	Canada	61
1978	US Billboard	76
