= Woman to Woman (Joe Cocker song) =

1972 song by Joe Cocker and Chris Stainton

"Woman to Woman" is a soul and rock song written by British singer Joe Cocker and Christopher Stainton, billed as Joe Cocker with the Chris Stainton Band. The song was released on Cocker's 1972 album Joe Cocker, and was the B-side to the single "Midnight Rider". After "Midnight Rider" hit number 27 on the Billboard Hot 100 in October 1972, "Woman to Woman" entered the chart in December, reaching number 56 in January 1973.

The song's piano and horn riff was used by hip-hop artists as a musical break for breakdancing and rapping, and producer Dr. Dre interpolated it for the Tupac Shakur single "California Love", which crossed over to hit number 1 for two weeks on the Hot 100 in 1996.

It was featured on the soundtrack for Grand Theft Auto: San Andreas, used for the fiction radio station K-DST.
