= Bye Bye Blackbird =

1926 song by Ray Henderson and Mort Dixon

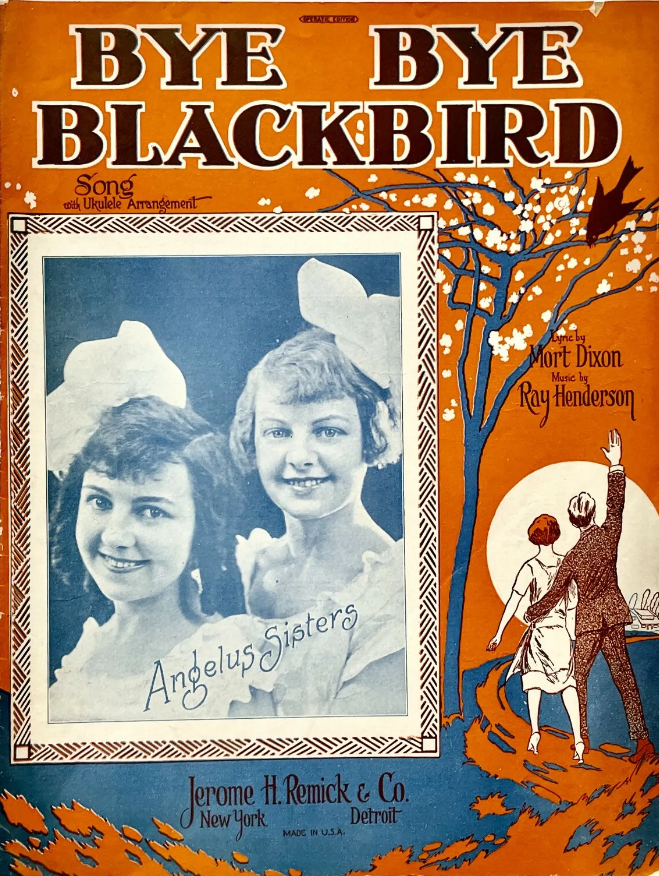
- Sheet music cover featuring the Angelus Sisters, 1926

Song
- Published: 1926
- Genre: Jazz
- Composer: Ray Henderson
- Lyricist: Mort Dixon

"Bye Bye Blackbird" is a 1926 song written by composer Ray Henderson and lyricist Mort Dixon and published by Jerome Remick. It is considered a popular standard and was first recorded by Sam Lanin's Dance Orchestra in March 1926.

== Song information ==
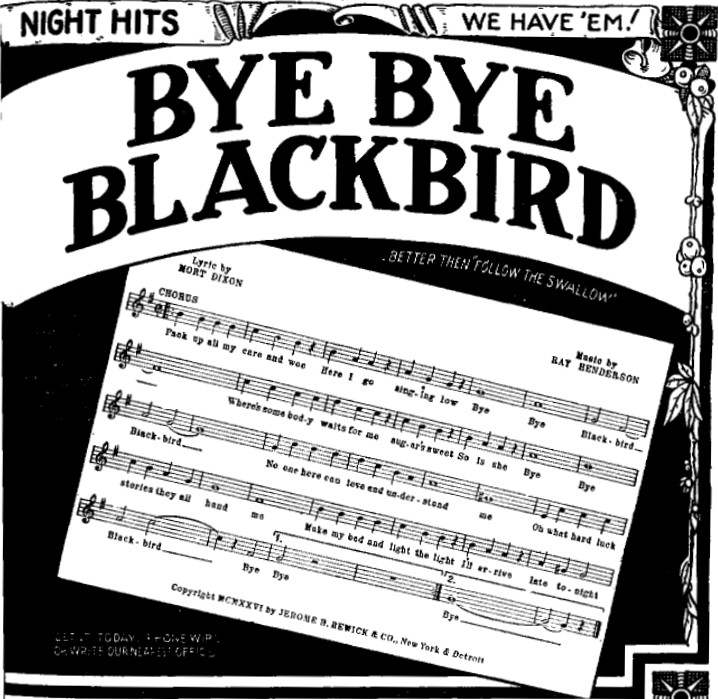
Advertisement in the May 5, 1926 Variety

Popular recordings in 1926 were by Nick Lucas, Gene Austin, Benny Krueger, and by Leo Reisman. It was the number 16 song of 1926 according to Pop Culture Madness.

Recordings of the song often include only the chorus; the verses are far less known.

== Recordings and performances ==
Julie London recorded it on her 1957 album Julie. The same year, Miles Davis recorded "Bye Bye Blackbird" for his album Round About Midnight.

Johnny Mathis made a beautiful recording of the song for his 1959 album Open Fire, Two Guitars for Columbia Records.

In 1968, Joe Cocker made a recording of "Bye Bye Blackbird" that was included on his 1969 album With a Little Help From My Friends. AllMusic reviewer Matthew Greenwald described it as a "classic pop gospel ballad".

Ringo Starr also included a version on his first solo album, Sentimental Journey, arranged by Maurice Gibb, released in 1970.

in the season 1 episode titled "Whatever Happened to the Old Songs?" of the TV series The Partridge Family (1970), Ray Bolger, guest starring as Shirley's father, performs the song when he temporarily joins the band.

In 1972, Liza Minnelli performed "Bye Bye Blackbird" (with choreography by director Bob Fosse) in her Emmy award-winning TV special Liza with a "Z".

In 1987, Sharon, Lois & Bram performed the song on their television series, Sharon, Lois & Bram's Elephant Show on the "Mother Goose" episode in 1987, and again in 1988 on the "Curio Shoppe" episode.

Tiny Tim recorded the song with Brave Combo on what would be his final recording, the 1996 album Girl.

In 2012, Paul McCartney covered "Bye Bye Blackbird" on his album Kisses on the Bottom.

In 2025, jazz pianist Francis Hon of New York University recorded an arrangement by American jazz composer Jeff Novotny.

== In popular culture ==
The song was featured in the 1955 movie musical Pete Kelly's Blues, sung by Peggy Lee in the role of alcoholic jazz singer Rose Hopkins.

In the 1957 Academy Award winning Looney Tunes cartoon Birds Anonymous, when Sylvester tries turning on the radio to have music take his mind off birds, the DJ announces that the previous song that they've just played was "Bye Bye Blackbird" and they would follow it with When the Red, Red Robin (Comes Bob, Bob, Bobbin' Along) (another bird themed song), making Sylvester turn off the radio instead.

In "Goodbye Nkrumah" (1966) Beat poet Diane Di Prima asks:

And yet, where would we be without the American culture
Bye bye blackbird, as Miles plays it, in the ’50s

Peter Falk sang the song in Anzio (1968).

Segregationists opposed to the American Civil Rights Movement, notably at the Selma to Montgomery marches, played the song over loudspeakers as a taunt.

In 1982, the Recording Industry Association of America (RIAA) posthumously awarded John Coltrane a Grammy Award for Best Jazz Solo Performance for the work on his album Bye Bye Blackbird at the 24th Annual Grammy Awards.

Joe Cocker's 1968 cover was featured in the 1993 romantic comedy Sleepless in Seattle.

In the 1993 Columbo episode “It’s All in the Game”, written by its series’ star Peter Falk, the song is performed at a party.

In 2005, Peggy Lee's version of "Bye Bye Blackbird" was used in Peter Jackson's remake of King Kong.

In 2006, the song features near the end of the British film The History Boys. It is sung by the main cast of young actors in front of a school assembly that is paying tribute to an eccentric but inspirational teacher who has just died.

In 2017, the song was featured in series 4 episode 3 of Peaky Blinders.

== See also ==
- List of 1920s jazz standards
- My Blue Heaven
