= Maxine Waters Willard =

American singer (born 1945)

- Born: Lorna Maxine Waters; July 14, 1945 (age 81); Texas, U.S.
- Origin: Los Angeles, California, U.S.
- Genres: R&B, soul, pop
- Labels: Blue Note, Warner Bros., Arista, Waterwheel

Lorna Maxine Waters (born July 14, 1945) is an American singer, best known for her backing vocals.

She is the sister of Oren Waters, Luther Waters, and Julia Waters Tillman. Waters and her sister have been referred to as the Waters Sisters. They are featured on Michael Jackson's 1982 album Thriller, and in the documentary film 20 Feet from Stardom.

== Biography ==
Waters was born Lorna Maxine Waters on July 14, 1945, in Texas to Lorena Waters. She was raised in Los Angeles by her mother with her 3 siblings.

Waters and her siblings formed the Waters in the mid-1970s. They recorded for labels including Blue Note, Warner Bros., Arista, and Waterwheel. They recorded two self-titled albums in 1975 and 1977, along with Watercolors, released in 1980, and Welcome Home, released in 1988. Waters appearaed in movies such as in Rock Prophecies, The Life and Tragic Death of James Byrd, Disney's The Kid, Wag the Dog, Spy Hard, and Vampire in Brooklyn.

Waters' session work included working with Adele, Barbra Streisand, Janet Jackson, Michael Jackson, and Whitney Houston, former members of The Beatles: Paul McCartney, George Harrison, and Ringo Starr, other musical artists, Anita Baker, Celine Dion, Helen Reddy, Christina Aguilera, Santana, Leonard Cohen, Dolly Parton, Donna Summer, Elton John, Patti LaBelle, David Ruffin, Lionel Richie, Rick James, B.B. King, Teena Marie, Smokey Robinson, Bruce Springsteen, Jon Bon Jovi, Rod Stewart, and Gino Vannelli.

Waters lost her home in the Eaton Fire in January 2025.
