= Julia Waters Tillman =

American singer (born 1943)

Julia Ardelia Waters Tillman (born June 8, 1943) is an American singer, best known for her backing vocals.

Julia is sister to Oren Waters, Luther Waters, and Maxine Waters Willard. Julia and Maxine Waters are sometimes referred to as "The Waters Sisters".

== Biography ==
Tillman was born on June 8, 1943 in Jefferson County, Texas, to Lorena Waters. She was raised in Los Angeles by her mother with her three siblings.

Tillman and her siblings formed the Waters in the mid-1970s and they recorded for labels including for Blue Note, Warner Brothers, Arista, and Waterwheel. They recorded albums such as with two self-titled albums in 1975 and 1977, with Watercolors, released in 1980, and Welcome Home, released in 1988. Tillman made appearances in movies such as in Rock Prophecies, The Life and Tragic Death of James Byrd, Disney's The Kid, Wag the Dog, Spy Hard, and Vampire in Brooklyn. Waters Tillman also appeared in the 2013 documentary 20 Feet From Stardom which won the Academy Award for Best Documentary Feature at the 86th Academy Awards.

Tillman's session work has included working with Adele, Barbra Streisand, Janet Jackson, Michael Jackson, and Whitney Houston, former members of The Beatles: Paul McCartney, George Harrison, and Ringo Starr, other musical artists such as:

- Anita Baker
- B.B. King
- Bruce Springsteen
- Celine Dion
- Christina Aguilera
- David Ruffin
- Dolly Parton
- Donna Summer
- Elton John
- Gino Vannelli
- Helen Reddy
- Jon Bon Jovi
- Leonard Cohen
- Lionel Richie
- Patti LaBelle
- Rick James
- Rod Stewart
- Smokey Robinson
- Tina Turner and
- Teena Marie among others.
