= Sheffield Steel =

1982 album by Joe Cocker

Studio album by Joe Cocker
- Released: May 1982
- Studio: Compass Point Studios (Nassau, Bahamas)
- Genre: Blues rock; soft rock
- Length: 38:19
- Label: Island
- Producer: Chris Blackwell; Alex Sadkin

Joe Cocker chronology
Luxury You Can Afford (1978)	Sheffield Steel (1982)	Civilized Man (1984)

Professional ratings
Review scores
Source	Rating
AllMusic	3.5/5 stars
Rolling Stone	4/5 stars

Sheffield Steel is the eighth studio album by English singer Joe Cocker, produced by Chris Blackwell and Alex Sadkin, with Sly and Robbie, Wally Badarou, Barry Reynolds, Mikey Chung and Uziah "Sticky" Thompson, a.k.a. the Compass Point Allstars, a studio band named after the legendary Compass Point Studios, Nassau, Bahamas, and released in 1982. This was Cocker's first album for Island Records and followed a four-year break (the longest between two albums in his career) in recording following his previous album, Luxury You Can Afford. It was re-released in 2002 with several bonus tracks.

== Track listing ==
1. "Look What You've Done" (Leo Nocentelli) - 4:14
2. "Shocked" (Ira Ingber, Gregg Sutton) - 3:13
3. "Sweet Little Woman" (Andy Fraser) - 4:01
4. "Seven Days" (Bob Dylan) - 5:23
5. "Marie" (Randy Newman) - 2:34
6. "Ruby Lee" (Bill Withers, Melvin Dunlap) - 4:24
7. "Many Rivers to Cross" (Jimmy Cliff) - 3:43
8. "So Good, So Right" (Brenda Russell) - 2:33
9. "Talking Back to the Night" (Steve Winwood, Will Jennings) - 4:49
10. "Just Like Always" (Jimmy Webb) - 3:25

=== Bonus tracks ===
1. "Sweet Little Woman" (Andy Fraser) [12" mix] - 5:59
2. "Look What You've Done" (Leo Nocentelli) [12" mix] - 8:40
3. "Right in the Middle (Of Falling in Love)" (Sam Dees) - 3:48
4. "Inner City Blues" (Marvin Gaye, James Nyx Jr.) - 5:20

== Personnel ==
- Joe Cocker – vocals
- Wally Badarou – keyboards
- Mikey Chung – guitars (1, 2, 4–10)
- Barry Reynolds – guitars (1, 2, 4–10), backing vocals (8)
- Adrian Belew – guitars (3)
- Robbie Shakespeare – bass, backing vocals (3)
- Sly Dunbar – drums
- Uziah "Sticky" Thompson – percussion
- Jimmy Cliff – backing vocals (3)
- Robert Palmer – backing vocals (8)

== Production ==
- Chris Blackwell – producer
- Alex Sadkin – producer, recording engineer
- Benjamin Armbrister – recording engineer
- Ted Jensen – mastering at Sterling Sound (New York City, New York)
- Paul Wexler – production associate
- David Oxtoby – cover painting
- Lynn Goldsmith – photography
- Michael Lang for Better Music, Inc. – management

== Chart performance ==
Year	Chart	Position
1982	Norway	9
1982	Australia	14
1982	New Zealand	14
1982	Denmark	15
1982	Canada	21
1982	Germany	46
1982	U.S. Billboard	105

== Certifications ==
Region	Certification	Certified units/sales
France (SNEP)	Gold	100,000^{*}
^{*} Sales figures based on certification alone.
