= Delta Lady =

Original song written and composed by Leon Russell

- Side A of the original UK single

Single by Joe Cocker

from the album Joe Cocker!
- B-side: "She's So Good To Me"
- Released: October 1969
- Recorded: 1969
- Genre: Rock
- Length: 2:51
- Label: Regal Zonophone (UK); A&M (US)
- Songwriter: Leon Russell
- Producers: Denny Cordell, Leon Russell

Joe Cocker singles chronology
"Feelin' Alright" (1968)	"Delta Lady" (1969)	"She Came In Through the Bathroom Window" (1969)

"Delta Lady" is a song written and composed by American rock singer and pianist Leon Russell. It was first recorded by British singer Joe Cocker for his 1969 album Joe Cocker! and also appeared on his 1970 concert album Mad Dogs & Englishmen. Cocker's single peaked at #10 on the UK singles chart and at #69 on the Billboard Hot 100. Russell went on to record his own version for his 1970 self-titled debut solo album and was released as a single the following year. Like "A Song for You" from the same album, Russell was inspired to write the song by vocalist Rita Coolidge. Coolidge named her autobiography after the song.

== Joe Cocker version ==
Russell co-produced Joe Cocker's second studio album Joe Cocker! in 1969, and wrote two songs for the album, "Delta Lady" and "Hello, Little Friend." As Rita Coolidge recalled in her 2016 autobiography Delta Lady: A Memoir, she was living with Russell at the time: "'Delta Lady' was about me: 'Woman of the country, now I've found you / longing in your soft and fertile delta... be all mine, Delta lady.' I was deeply honored, of course — no one had ever written a song about me." Russell also wrote "A Song for You" about Coolidge before they broke up later in 1969.

Cocker's studio version (which featured Coolidge on backing vocals along with others including Bonnie Bramlett) was released as the first single from the album and hit the top 10 on the UK singles chart. In 1970, the song closed out Cocker's live album Mad Dogs & Englishmen, recorded at Fillmore East in New York City.

Charts

Chart (1969)	Peak position
Australia	34
Canada RPM Top Singles	85
Netherlands	15
New Zealand (Listener)	18
UK Singles Chart	10
US Billboard Hot 100	69

== Leon Russell version ==
"Delta Lady"
- Side A of the UK single

Single by Leon Russell

from the album Leon Russell
- B-side: "Pisces Apple Lady"
- Released: February 5, 1971
- Recorded: 1969–1970
- Genre: Rock
- Length: 4:00
- Label: Shelter (US); A&M (UK)
- Songwriter: Leon Russell
- Producers: Denny Cordell, Leon Russell

Leon Russell singles chronology
"Roll Away the Stone" (1970)	"Delta Lady" (1971)	"The Ballad of Mad Dogs and Englishmen" (1971)

Russell recorded the song for his self-titled debut solo album, which was released in 1970 on Shelter Records. It led off side two of the album, while Russell's other song about Rita Coolidge, "A Song for You," led off side one. "Delta Lady" was released as a single on A&M Records in the UK, backed with "Pisces Apple Lady."
