= Feelin' Alright? =

1968 single by Traffic

- Dutch single picture sleeve

Single by Traffic

from the album Traffic
- B-side: "Withering Tree"
- Released: September 1968
- Recorded: Early–mid 1968
- Genre: Funk rock
- Length: 4:16
- Label: Island; United Artists
- Songwriter: Dave Mason
- Producer: Jimmy Miller

Traffic singles chronology
| "No Face, No Name, No Number" (1968) | "Feelin' Alright?" (1968) | "Medicated Goo" (1968) |

Audio
- "Feelin' Alright?" on YouTube

"Feelin' Alright?", also spelled "Feeling Alright", is a song written by Dave Mason of the English rock band Traffic for their eponymous 1968 album Traffic. It was also released as a single, and failed to chart on both the UK Singles Chart and the US Billboard Hot 100, but it did reach a bubbling under position of No. 123 on the Bubbling Under Hot 100. Joe Cocker performed a more popular rendition of the song on his 1969 album With a Little Help from My Friends which did chart in the U.S. Both Traffic's and Cocker's versions appear in the 2012 movie Flight. The song was also featured in the 2000 film Duets, sung by Huey Lewis.

== Background ==
Dave Mason wrote "Feelin' Alright?" in Greece after leaving Traffic for the first time. He explained, "I think I had the words first. The funny thing is, people seem to think that it’s a fun sort of song, but it’s really about unrequited love. There’s a question mark in the title. It asks, 'Are you feeling all right?' 'Actually, I’m not feeling very good at all.'"

The song features a simple two-chord composition. Mason explained, "I had been playing sitar, so I wanted a certain sitar-like quality. It's not one chord, like a James Brown song, but it's close. The good thing was that I didn't need to do demos. Two chords I could remember."

Mason rejoined Traffic for their second album. During the recording, producer Jimmy Miller encouraged Mason and praised the song as "fantastic."

== Traffic version credits ==
- Dave Mason – lead vocal, guitar
- Chris Wood – tenor saxophone, backing vocal
- Steve Winwood – piano, bass, backing vocal
- Jim Capaldi – drums, percussion, backing vocal

== Joe Cocker version ==
"Feelin' Alright"
- 1972 Dutch single sleeve

Single by Joe Cocker

from the album With a Little Help from My Friends
- B-side: "Sandpaper Cadillac" (original 1969 release) "Darlin' Be Home Soon" (1972 re-issue)
- Released: May 1969
- Recorded: Autumn 1968
- Genre: Blue-eyed soul
- Length: 4:10
- Label: Regal Zonophone; A&M; Polydor (re-issue)
- Songwriter: Dave Mason
- Producer: Denny Cordell

Joe Cocker singles chronology
| "With a Little Help from My Friends" (1968) | "Feelin' Alright" (1969) | "Delta Lady" (1969) |
| "High Time We Went" (1971) | "Feeling Alright (re-release)" (1972) | "Midnight Rider" (1972) |

Audio
- "Feelin' Alright" on YouTube

Joe Cocker recorded it to lead off his debut album With a Little Help from My Friends in 1969. He also amended the title of the original from "Feelin' Alright?" to "Feeling Alright". Released as a single in 1969, it reached No. 69 on the US singles chart, No. 49 in Canada, and the tip position in French Belgium. When it was re-released in early 1972 (with a new B-side, a cover of The Lovin' Spoonful's "Darling Be Home Soon"), it reached even higher to No. 33 on the same chart, No. 35 in Canada, and its highest position at No. 11 in the Netherlands. A live version was included in his double album Mad Dogs & Englishmen of 1970. Cocker performed a 'duet' of this song with John Belushi imitating Cocker on the third episode of Saturday Night Live's second season, which aired on 2 October 1976. Cocker also performed the song with Huey Lewis on Jimmy Kimmel Live!, which aired on 19 July 2012.

=== Joe Cocker version credits ===
- Joe Cocker – vocals
- Artie Butler – piano
- David Cohen – guitar
- Carol Kaye – bass
- Paul Humphrey – drums
- Laudir de Oliveira – percussion
- Merry Clayton, Brenda Holloway, Patrice Holloway – backing vocals

=== Certifications ===
| Region | Certification | Certified units/sales |
|---|---|---|
| New Zealand (RMNZ) | Gold | 15,000^{‡} |
^{‡} Sales+streaming figures based on certification alone.

== Other notable versions ==
- An early version by Traffic, featuring flute as well as saxophone, appears on the Dave Mason compilation Scrapbook.
- Mongo Santamaría released a cover from his album Feelin' Alright on Atlantic Records in November 1969; his version titled "Feeling Alright" was a minor hit, reaching number 95 on the US Billboard Hot 100.
- The Jackson 5 covered the song in 1971, first performing it in medley with "I'll Be There" on Diana Ross' TV special Diana! that March, and later again on their own TV special Goin' Back to Indiana in September. Jackson 5 lead singer Michael Jackson later featured on Mason's 1980 single "Save Me".
- Grand Funk Railroad released a version in May 1971 as "Feelin' Alright," which was a minor hit, reaching No. 54 on the Billboard Hot 100. It was included in the band's 1971 album Survival.
- Detroit-based rock/soul band Rare Earth of "I Just Want to Celebrate" fame covered “Feelin' Alright?” on their 1969 album Get Ready.
- Gladys Knight & the Pips included a version of "Feeling Alright" on their 1971 album If I Were Your Woman.
- A live version by Mason appears on his 1972 album Headkeeper and his 1973 live album Dave Mason Is Alive.
- Mason recorded another solo version on the soundtrack of the 1979 film Skatetown, U.S.A..
- John Goodman did a version of the song for his appearance in Muppets Tonight in 1996.
- Huey Lewis covered the song on the soundtrack of the 2000 film Duets. Lewis later peformed the song with Cocker on the American chat show Jimmy Kimmel Live! in 2012.
- Mason recorded yet another version in 2020 with "the Quarantines" in a COVID-19 pandemic release (featuring Mick Fleetwood, Sammy Hagar, Michael McDonald, Patrick Simmons, John McFee and Tom Johnston).
