= Mad Dogs & Englishmen: The Complete Fillmore East Concerts =

Live album by Joe Cocker
- Released: 2006
- Recorded: 27–28 March 1970 at Fillmore East, New York City
- Genre: Rock
- Label: Hip-O Select

Joe Cocker chronology
Gold (2006)	Mad Dogs & Englishmen: The Complete Fillmore East Concerts (2006)	Hymn for My Soul (2007)

Professional ratings
Review scores
Source	Rating
AllMusic	3.5/5 stars

Mad Dogs & Englishmen: The Complete Fillmore East Concerts is a live album by English singer Joe Cocker, recorded in New York City in 1970.

The album Mad Dogs & Englishmen turned 35 years old in 2005. Commemorating this birthday was the release of the limited edition Mad Dogs & Englishmen: The Complete Fillmore East Concerts, documenting the entire four shows (on six discs) performed on Friday, 27 March and Saturday, 28 March 1970 at New York City's Fillmore East.

== Track listing ==
Disc one

Friday March 27, 1970, early show:

1. "Honky Tonk Women"
2. "Let's Go Get Stoned"
3. "Sticks and Stones"
4. "Bird on a Wire"
5. "Cry Me a River"
6. "Superstar" performed by Rita Coolidge
7. "Delta Lady"
8. "Something"
9. "Feelin' Alright"
10. Blue medley:

- "I'll Drown in My Own Tears"
- "When Something Is Wrong with My Baby"
- "I've Been Loving You Too Long"

11. "Space Captain"
12. "The Letter"
13. "Girl from The North Country" performed by Joe Cocker and Leon Russell

Disc Two

Friday March 27, 1970, late show:

1. "Honky Tonk Women"
2. "She Came In Through the Bathroom Window"
3. "Let's Go Get Stoned"
4. "Bird on a Wire"
5. "Cry Me a River"
6. "Superstar" performed by Rita Coolidge
7. "Feelin' Alright"
8. "Something"
9. "Sticks and Stones"
10. Blue medley:

- "I'll Drown in My Own Tears"
- "When Something Is Wrong with My Baby"
- "I've Been Loving You Too Long"

Disc Three

Friday March 27, 1970, late show, continued:

1. "Space Captain"
2. "Hummingbird" performed by Leon Russell
3. "Dixie Lullaby" performed by Leon Russell
4. "Delta Lady"
5. "The Letter"
6. "With a Little Help from My Friends"

Disc Four

Saturday March 28, 1970, early show:

1. "Honky Tonk Women"
2. "She Came In Through the Bathroom Window"
3. "Sticks and Stones"
4. "Bird on a Wire"
5. "Cry Me a River"
6. "Superstar" performed by Rita Coolidge
7. "Feelin' Alright"
8. "Something"
9. "Space Captain"
10. "Let It Be" performed by Claudia Lennear
11. "Delta Lady"
12. "The Letter"
13. Blue medley:

- "I'll Drown in My Own Tears"
- "When Something Is Wrong with My Baby"
- "I've Been Loving You Too Long"

14. "Give Peace a Chance"

Disc Five

Saturday March 28, 1970, late show:

1. "Honky Tonk Women"
2. "She Came In Through the Bathroom Window"
3. "The Weight"
4. "Cry Me a River"
5. "Further On Up the Road" Performed By Don Preston
6. "Darling Be Home Soon"
7. "Space Captain"
8. "Superstar" performed by Rita Coolidge
9. "Delta Lady"
10. "Let's Go Get Stoned"
11. "Sticks and Stones"
12. "Let It Be" performed by Claudia Lennear

Disc Six

Saturday March 28, 1970, late show, continued:

1. "Feelin' Alright"
2. "Something"
3. "The Letter"
4. "Give peace a Chance"
5. Blue Medley:

- "I'll Drown in My Own Tears"
- "When Something Is Wrong with My Baby"
- "I've Been Loving You Too Long"

6. "With a Little Help from My Friends"

== Personnel ==
- Joe Cocker, Rita Coolidge, Donna Washburn, Claudia Lennear, Denny Cordell, Daniel Moore, Pamela Polland, Matthew Moore, Nicole Barclay, Bobby Jones - vocals
- Leon Russell - lead guitar, piano, vocals, backing vocals
- Don Preston - guitar, vocals, backing vocals
- Chris Stainton - organ, piano
- Carl Radle - bass guitar
- Jim Gordon, Jim Keltner, Chuck Blackwell - drums
- Chuck Blackwell, Sandy Konikoff, Bobby Torres - percussion
- Jim Horn, Bobby Keys - saxophone
- Jim Price - trumpet

Technical

- Album cover photography: Jim McCrary
- Tour photographers: Andee Cohen, Linda Wolf
