= Mad Dogs & Englishmen (film) =

- Theatrical release poster
- Directed by: Pierre Adidge
- Produced by: Robert Abel; Pierre Adidge; Harry Marks
- Starring: Joe Cocker; Leon Russell
- Cinematography: David Myers
- Edited by: Sidney Levin
- Production companies: A&M Films; Creative Film Associates
- Distributed by: Metro-Goldwyn-Mayer
- Release date: March 29, 1971
- Running time: 117 minutes
- Country: United States
- Language: English

Mad Dogs & Englishmen is a 1971 American documentary film of British singer Joe Cocker's 1970 U.S. tour, directed by Pierre Adidge, starring Cocker and Leon Russell. The film was released on March 29, 1971, by Metro-Goldwyn-Mayer.

== Cast ==
- Joe Cocker
- Leon Russell
- Chris Stainton
- Jim Price
- Bobby Keys
- Jim Gordon
- Jim Keltner
- Carl Radle
- Don Preston
- Sandy Konikoff
- Chuck Blackwell
- Bobby Torres
- Jim Horn
- Rita Coolidge
- Claudia Lennear
- Donna Washburn
- Donna Weiss
- Pamela Polland
- Matthew Moore
- Daniel Moore
- Bobby Jones
- Nicole Barclay
- Denny Cordell
- Barney Cordell
- Tarka Cordell
- Sherman Jones
- Emily Smith
- Connie Di Nardo
- Gail Stainton
- Linda Wolf
- Andrea Cohen
- Carol Hughsby
- Carla Brown
- Sean Brown
- Mark Brown
- Kay Poorboy
- Francine Brockey
- Judy Keys
- Sallay Clear
- Darlene Coy
- Canina - the dog

== Reception ==
Roger Ebert of the Chicago Sun-Times gave the film three stars out of four and wrote that "the musical scenes are the best rock coverage since 'Woodstock.' The sound is first rate, for one thing, and director Pierre Adidge has some idea of why Cocker electrifies a crowd." Vincent Canby of The New York Times called the film a "most satisfying, record-album of a movie" which "patronizes neither its audience nor its stars ... It is uncluttered, one of the best concert films so far." A review in Variety said, "Considerable technical expertise has gone into this production, and though the objective may be clear, it just hasn't turned out to be another 'Woodstock,' possibly because Joe Cocker's personality isn't all that endearing." Gene Siskel of the Chicago Tribune rated the film three stars out of four and wrote, "'Mad Dogs' is distinguishable from other 'rockumentaries' because it deals almost exclusively with the musician and his music. There are few side trips to cultural comments." Robert Hilburn of the Los Angeles Times stated, "As a film, 'Mad Dogs and Englishmen' is a good concert. For much of the picture's 114 minutes, the camera is on Joe Cocker, by most standards the best and most exciting singer in rock music ... But 'Mad Dogs and Englishmen,' unfortunately, fails in the end to rise above this interesting, but clearly limited historical summary of the Cocker tour. As a film, it doesn't establish its own importance." A negative review by Tom Zito of The Washington Post advised readers to "Forget the film and try the record," explaining, "What emerges from all this is roughly two hours of footage that looks terrible on the screen and sounds almost as bad. The film is projected in an annoying square format, except for the moments when the screen area is broken up into some poorly coordinated split-screen effects. The camerawork is often sloppy ... the whole thing winds up looking and sounding like a cheap, imitation (indoor) 'Woodstock.'" James D. White of The Monthly Film Bulletin declared that "The music itself is excellent," but "The film's information content is minimal; and one's heart sinks as the screen is split into a double image for the first number and as the mandatory shots—of excited fans, of joint-rolling in a hotel bedroom, of an interview with a vacuous groupie—are inevitably wheeled out."

== See also ==
- List of American films of 1971
