= Chris Stainton =

English musician (born 1944)

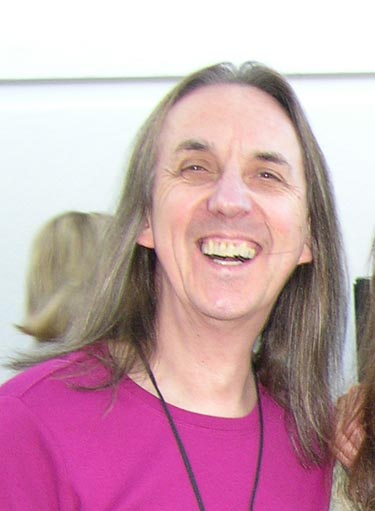
- Stainton in 2009

Background information
- Born: Christopher Robert Stainton; 22 March 1944 (age 82); Sheffield, West Riding of Yorkshire, England
- Genres: Rock; blues
- Occupations: Session musician; songwriter
- Instruments: Keyboards; bass guitar
- Years active: 1959–present
- Formerly of: The Grease Band; Spooky Tooth; Boxer; The Who

Christopher Robert Stainton (born 22 March 1944) is an English session musician, keyboard player, bassist and songwriter, who first gained recognition with Joe Cocker in the late 1960s. In addition to his collaboration with Cocker, Stainton is best known for his work with Eric Clapton, The Who, Andy Fairweather Low, Roger Waters and Bryan Ferry.

== Career ==
Stainton was born in Woodseats, Sheffield. After passing his eleven-plus examination, Stainton attended Rowlinson Technical School, Norton, Sheffield. Stainton's musical career began in 1960, when he played bass guitar with a local Sheffield band, 'Johnny Tempest and the Mariners'. The Mariners became 'The Cadillacs', before Stainton joined Joe Cocker in The Grease Band during 1966. Stainton co-wrote "Marjorine", Cocker's first UK Singles Chart hit in 1968. Chris played bass guitar on Joe Cocker's subsequent number one hit With a Little Help from My Friends.

His time as a Cocker backing musician came to a zenith on the Mad Dogs & Englishmen tour, in the United States and Canada in 1970. His initial involvement with Cocker lasted until the end of 1972. Throughout that decade Chris Stainton appeared with musicians such as Spooky Tooth (1970), The Chris Stainton Band (1972–73), Tundra (1974), Bryn Haworth Band (1976–77), Boxer (1977), Maddy Prior Band (1978), Rocks (1978) and Elkie Brooks (1978).

By 1979, he teamed up with Eric Clapton for the first time, beginning an intermittent working relationship that has lasted to the present time. He joined Clapton on Roger Waters's The Pros and Cons of Hitch Hiking tour during 1984, and also toured again with Joe Cocker on and off from 1988 until 2000.

In 1985, Stainton and Clapton both appeared in the George Harrison-produced film Water in a mock 'charity concert' – the Concert for Cascara.

In November 2002, Chris appeared at the Concert for George, and has more recently appeared as one of Bill Wyman's Rhythm Kings.

Stainton has been a member of the Eric Clapton band virtually full-time since 2002, touring worldwide almost every year until the present time. He toured with Clapton on his 2008 North American and European tour, which included a three-night collaboration with Steve Winwood at Madison Square Garden in February 2008, and toured with Winwood and Clapton in 2009 and 2010.

In July 2012, Stainton was announced as a keyboardist for The Who's 2012–2013 Quadrophenia & More Tour (he played piano on three songs on the original Quadrophenia album, "The Dirty Jobs", "5:15", and "Drowned"). He performed with the band at the closing ceremony of the London Olympics. However, he subsequently withdrew prior to the start of the tour, to join Clapton on his tour of the US and Europe, that ultimately ended at O2 Arena Prague on 19 June 2013.

Stainton toured with Clapton in Japan, the Middle East and Europe in 2014. On 11 September 2015, he was honoured and performed with the Tedeschi Trucks Band in a tribute/reunion concert for Joe Cocker, at the Lockn' Festival in Arrington, Virginia. The concert honoured Joe and the Mad Dogs and Englishmen Tour. Alumni included from the 1970 Tour included Leon Russell, Rita Coolidge, Claudia Lennear, Bobby Jones, Pamela Polland, Matthew Moore, Daniel Moore, Chuck Blackwell and Bobby Torres and original Tour photographer Linda Wolf. Wolf's iconic photographs from the 1970 Tour introduced the concert to the audience. A documentary movie of the reunion and concert was released in 2016, directed by Jojo Pennebaker, son of D. A. Pennebaker and Jesse Lauter.

Chris Stainton played on Eric Clapton's 2016 album I Still Do and subsequently joined Clapton for a brief tour of Japan in April 2016. As of October 2024, he is still regularly touring with Eric Clapton.

== Discography ==
- Joe Cocker
  - With a Little Help from My Friends (1969, A&M)
  - Joe Cocker! (1969, A&M)
  - Mad Dogs and Englishmen (1970, A&M)
  - Joe Cocker (1972, A&M)
  - One Night of Sin (1989, Capitol)
  - Night Calls (1991, Capitol)
  - Have a Little Faith (1994, 550 Music)
  - The Long Voyage Home (1995, A&M) (compilation box set)
  - Organic (1996, 550 Music)
  - Across from Midnight (1997, CMC International)
- Leon Russell
  - Leon Russell (1970, Shelter)
  - Leon Russell and The Shelter People (1971, Shelter)
- Spooky Tooth
  - The Last Puff (1970, Island)
  - The Best of Spooky Tooth (1970, Island) (compilation album)
- Don Nix
  - Living By the Days (1971, Elektra)
- The Who
  - Quadrophenia (1973, Track) (2-LP)
  - Tommy (1975, Polydor) (2-LP)
- Bryn Haworth
  - Sunny Side of the Street (1974, Island)
  - Keep the Ball Rolling (1979, A&M)
- Jim Capaldi
  - Whale Meat Again (1974, Island)
- The Grease Band
  - Amazing Grease (1975, Goodear)
- Ian Hunter
  - All-American Alien Boy (1976, CBS)
  - Once Bitten Twice Shy (2000)
- Maddy Prior
  - Changing Winds (1978, Chrysalis)
  - Memento: the Best of Maddy Prior (1995)
- Stephen Bishop
  - Red Cab to Manhattan (1980, Warner)
- Eric Clapton
  - Just One Night (1980)
  - Another Ticket (1981)
  - Money and Cigarettes (1983)
  - Behind the Sun (1985)
  - From The Cradle (1994)
  - Live in Hyde Park (1997)
  - Pilgrim (1998)
  - Sessions for Robert J (2004)
  - Back Home (2005)
  - Old Sock (2013)
  - I Still Do (2016)
  - Live in San Diego (2016)
- Marianne Faithfull
  - Dangerous Acquaintances (1981, Island)
  - A Perfect Stranger: The Island Anthology (1998)
- Alvin Lee Band
  - RX5 (1981, Avatar)
- Gary Brooker
  - Lead Me to the Water (1982, Mercury)
- Pete Townshend
  - All the Best Cowboys Have Chinese Eyes (1982, Atlantic)
- Ringo Starr
  - Old Wave (1983)
  - Starr Struck: Best of Ringo Starr, Vol. 2 (1989)
- Simon Townshend (the younger brother of Pete Townshend)
  - Sweet Sound (1983 and 1984, Polydor)
- Bryan Ferry
  - Taxi (1993)
- B. B. King
  - Deuces Wild (1997, MCA)
  - Here and There: the Uncollected B. B. King (2001)
- Eros Ramazzotti
  - Eros Live (1998)
- The Alarm
  - Best of the Alarm & Mike Peters (1998)
  - Eye of the Hurricane (expanded) (2002)
- Jimmy Smith
  - Dot Com Blues (2001)
- David Gilmour
  - On an Island (2006)
- Andy Fairweather Low
  - The Very Best of Andy Fairweather Low (2008)

== See also ==
- List of keyboardists
