= Mad Dogs & Englishmen (album) =

Live album by Joe Cocker
- Released: August 1970
- Recorded: 27–28 March 1970
- Venues: Fillmore East, New York City
- Genres: Rock; soul; blues
- Length: 78:44; 136:30 (2005 Deluxe Edition)
- Label: A&M
- Producers: Denny Cordell, Leon Russell

Joe Cocker chronology
| Joe Cocker! (1969) | Mad Dogs & Englishmen (1970) | Joe Cocker (1972) |

Mad Dogs & Englishmen is a live album by English singer Joe Cocker, released in 1970. The album's title is drawn from the 1931 Noël Coward song of the same name and Leon Russell's "Ballad of Mad Dogs and Englishmen". Only four songs of the 16 on the original album were drawn from his first two studio albums. Besides the contributions of bandmate and musical director Leon Russell, it draws equally from rock (the Rolling Stones, Traffic, Bob Dylan, the Beatles) and soul (Ray Charles, Sam & Dave, Otis Redding, The Box Tops). Accompanying Cocker is a choir, a three-piece horn section and several drummers.

The single "The Letter"/"Space Captain", recorded during rehearsals, was released to coincide with the tour. The album yielded the single "Cry Me a River"/"Give Peace a Chance." "Ballad of Mad Dogs and Englishmen"/"Let It Be" was a single from the movie soundtrack that featured Leon Russell and Claudia Lennear. The Leon Russell song was also released on his album Leon Russell and the Shelter People.

In 2005, Mad Dogs & Englishmen was released as a two-disc deluxe edition set through Universal Records to commemorate the album's 35th anniversary.

In 2006, Mad Dogs & Englishmen was released as a six-disc box set under the title Mad Dogs & Englishmen: The Complete Fillmore East Concerts by Hip-O Select. Both early and late shows from 27 and 28 March 1970, were released in their entirety.

== Background ==
According to the liner notes, Cocker needed to put together a band quickly for a U.S. tour that his management had organized. He was informed only on 12 March 1970 about the tour which would start on 20 March. Russell recruited the musicians, many from his prior association with Delaney & Bonnie (Rita Coolidge, Carl Radle, Jim Price, Jim Horn, Jim Keltner and Jim Gordon). Chris Stainton was held over from Cocker's Grease Band and Cocker's producer Denny Cordell was part of the backing vocalists, as was Nicole Barclay of the band Fanny, and Claudia Lennear, the supposed subject of the Rolling Stones' hit, "Brown Sugar".

The tour was filmed, resulting in the theatrically released concert film of the same name.

== Reception ==
Professional ratings
Review scores
| Source | Rating |
|---|---|
| AllMusic | 4.5/5 stars |
| Christgau's Record Guide | B+ |
| Rolling Stone | 4/5 stars |
| Uncut | 4/5 stars |

Initially, Pete Nartez's review in Rolling Stone was generally negative, assessing that the album was "formed on a few days' notice to meet contractual obligations, and sounds like, well, like a group that was formed on a few days' notice to meet contractual obligations." He praised the tracks "Feelin' Alright," "Give Peace a Chance" and "Delta Lady," but criticized the majority of the arrangements and said the album lacks stylistic variety.

A more recent review of the box set in the same magazine was more positive, calling the band "a pickup orchestra with saloon-soul swagger."

In a retrospective review for AllMusic, Bruce Eder praised the album for the unique sound created by the unconventionally large rock band. He noted that Cocker's creative presence on the album was drowned out by that of Russell, but held that this was not a bad thing. Kevin Perry, writing Cocker's obituary in the NME, described the album as a classic and one of two things (the other his cover of "With a Little Help from My Friends") that first brought Cocker his fame.

In 1971 at the 13th Annual Grammy Awards, Mad Dogs & Englishmen was nominated for the Grammy for Best Contemporary Vocal Performance, Male. "Everything is Beautiful" by Ray Stevens won the Grammy in that category. In 2021, Mad Dogs & Englishmen was inducted into the Grammy Hall of Fame.

In 2015, the Tedeschi Trucks Band and Leon Russell covered the album in its entirety at Lockn' Festival, reuniting with many of the musicians from Cocker's original 1970 Mad Dogs & Englishmen Tour including Russell, Chris Stainton, Rita Coolidge, Pamela Polland, and Claudia Lennear. They were also joined by Chris Robinson, Doyle Bramhall II, Anders Osborne, John Bell, Dave Mason, and Warren Haynes. A live album of the concert was released on September 12, 2025.

== Track listing ==
Side one
| No. | Title | Writer(s) | Length |
|---|---|---|---|
| 1. | "Introduction (uncredited: "Turn on Your Love Light")" | | 0:44 |
| 2. | "Honky Tonk Women" | Mick Jagger, Keith Richards | 3:47 |
| 3. | "Introduction" | | 0:17 |
| 4. | "Sticks and Stones" | Titus Turner, Henry Glover | 2:37 |
| 5. | "Cry Me a River" | Arthur Hamilton | 4:00 |
| 6. | "Bird on the Wire" | Leonard Cohen | 6:37 |

Side two
| No. | Title | Writer(s) | Length |
|---|---|---|---|
| 7. | "Feelin' Alright" | Dave Mason | 5:47 |
| 8. | "Superstar" (lead vocal by Rita Coolidge) | Leon Russell, Delaney Bramlett (though credited to Bonnie Bramlett for contractual reasons) | 5:02 |
| 9. | "Introduction" | | 0:16 |
| 10. | "Let's Go Get Stoned" | Nickolas Ashford, Valerie Simpson, Josephine Armstead | 7:30 |

Side three
| No. | Title | Writer(s) | Length |
|---|---|---|---|
| 11. | "Blue Medley": a. "I'll Drown in My Own Tears"; b. "When Something Is Wrong with My Baby" (co-lead vocal by Bobby Jones); c. "I've Been Loving You Too Long" | Henry Glover; Isaac Hayes, David Porter; Otis Redding, Jerry Butler | 12:46 |
| 12. | "Introduction" | | 0:21 |
| 13. | "Girl from the North Country" (lead vocals by Cocker and Russell) | Bob Dylan | 2:32 |
| 14. | "Give Peace a Chance" | Leon Russell, Bonnie Bramlett | 4:14 |

Side four
| No. | Title | Writer(s) | Length |
|---|---|---|---|
| 15. | "Introduction" | | 0:41 |
| 16. | "She Came In Through the Bathroom Window" | John Lennon, Paul McCartney | 3:01 |
| 17. | "Space Captain" | Matthew Moore | 5:15 |
| 18. | "The Letter" | Wayne Carson Thompson | 4:46 |
| 19. | "Delta Lady" | Leon Russell | 5:40 |
| Total length: | | | 78:44 |

== 2005 deluxe edition ==
The two-disc deluxe edition expanded and re-sequenced the order of the original album more closely to reflect the actual order of the songs' presentation in concert. Introductions from the original album were matched with their corresponding songs, with about an hour of additional content, including songs with lead vocals performed by Leon Russell, Don Preston and Claudia Lennear as noted above. The new edition also added previously released Cocker covers such as "Darling Be Home Soon", "Something" and "With a Little Help from My Friends".

Four bonus tracks that were not recorded in concert were included. One was a rehearsal jam. The single ("The Letter/"Space Captain"), recorded during rehearsals on a sound stage, that was released to coincide with the tour was also included. "The Ballad of Mad Dogs and Englishmen" was recorded by Russell later in 1970 and released on his Leon Russell and the Shelter People album in 1971.

Disc one
| No. | Title | Writer(s) | Length |
|---|---|---|---|
| 1. | "Honky Tonk Women" | | 4:57 |
| 2. | "She Came in Through the Bathroom Window" | | 3:18 |
| 3. | "The Weight" | Robbie Robertson | 5:57 |
| 4. | "Sticks and Stones" | | 2:46 |
| 5. | "Bird on the Wire" | | 6:31 |
| 6. | "Cry Me a River" | | 4:05 |
| 7. | "Superstar" | | 4:59 |
| 8. | "Feelin' Alright" | | 5:47 |
| 9. | "Something" | George Harrison | 5:33 |
| 10. | "Darling Be Home Soon" | John Sebastian | 5:47 |
| 11. | "Let It Be" (lead vocal by Claudia Lennear) | Lennon, McCartney | 3:40 |
| 12. | "Farther Up the Road" (lead vocal by Don Preston) | Joe Medwick, Don Robey | 4:00 |

Disc two
| No. | Title | Writer(s) | Length |
|---|---|---|---|
| 13. | "Let's Go Get Stoned" | | 8:05 |
| 14. | "Space Captain" | | 5:20 |
| 15. | "Hummingbird" (lead vocal by Russell) | Russell | 4:08 |
| 16. | "Dixie Lullaby" (lead vocal by Russell) | Russell, Chris Stainton | 2:58 |
| 17. | "The Letter" | | 4:33 |
| 18. | "Delta Lady" | | 7:03 |
| 19. | "Give Peace a Chance" | | 4:46 |
| 20. | "Blue Medley": a. "I'll Drown in My Own Tears"; b. "When Something Is Wrong with My Baby"; c. "I've Been Loving You Too Long" | | 12:37 |
| 21. | "With a Little Help from My Friends" | Lennon, McCartney | 8:40 |
| 22. | "Girl from the North Country" | | 2:45 |
| 23. | "Warm Up Jam Including "Under My Thumb"" | Jagger, Richards | 5:45 |
| 24. | "The Letter" (single version) | | 4:10 |
| 25. | "Space Captain" (single version) | | 4:29 |
| 26. | "The Ballad of Mad Dogs and Englishmen" (lead vocal by Russell; studio recording) | Russell | 3:59 |

== Personnel ==
- Joe Cocker, Rita Coolidge, Donna Weiss, Donna Washburn, Claudia Lennear, Denny Cordell, Daniel Moore, Pamela Polland, Matthew Moore, Nicole Barclay, Bobby Jones – vocals
- Leon Russell – lead guitar, piano, vocals, backing vocals
- Don Preston – guitar, vocals, backing vocals
- Chris Stainton – organ, piano
- Carl Radle – bass guitar
- Jim Gordon, Jim Keltner, Chuck Blackwell – drums
- Chuck Blackwell, Sandy Konikoff, Bobby Torres – percussion
- Jim Horn, Bobby Keys – saxophone
- Jim Price – trumpet

Technical

- Album cover photography: Jim McCrary
- Tour photographers: Andee Cohen, Linda Wolf

== Charts ==
=== Weekly charts ===
Weekly chart performance for Mad Dogs & Englishmen
| Chart (1970–1971) | Peak position |
|---|---|
| Australian Albums (Kent Music Report) | 1 |
| Canada Top Albums/CDs (RPM) | 2 |
| Dutch Albums (Album Top 100) | 9 |
| Norwegian Albums (VG-lista) | 20 |
| UK Albums (OCC) | 16 |
| US Billboard Top LPs | 2 |
| US Best Selling Soul LP's (Billboard) | 23 |
| US Cashbox Top 100 Albums | 2 |
| US Record World Top 100 LP's | 1 |

Weekly chart performance for Mad Dogs & Englishmen Revisited
| Chart (2026) | Peak position |
|---|---|
| Greek Albums (IFPI) | 35 |

=== Year-end charts ===
1970 year-end chart performance for Mad Dogs & Englishmen
| Chart (1970) | Position |
|---|---|
| US Cashbox Top 100 Albums | 58 |
| US Record World Top 100 LP's | 15 |

1971 year-end chart performance for Mad Dogs & Englishmen
| Chart (1971) | Position |
|---|---|
| Dutch Albums (Album Top 100) | 69 |
| US Billboard 200 | 95 |

== Certifications ==
| Region | Certification | Certified units/sales |
|---|---|---|
| United States (RIAA) | Gold | 500,000^{^} |
^{^} Shipments figures based on certification alone.
