= Linda Wolf =

American photographer and author (born 1950)

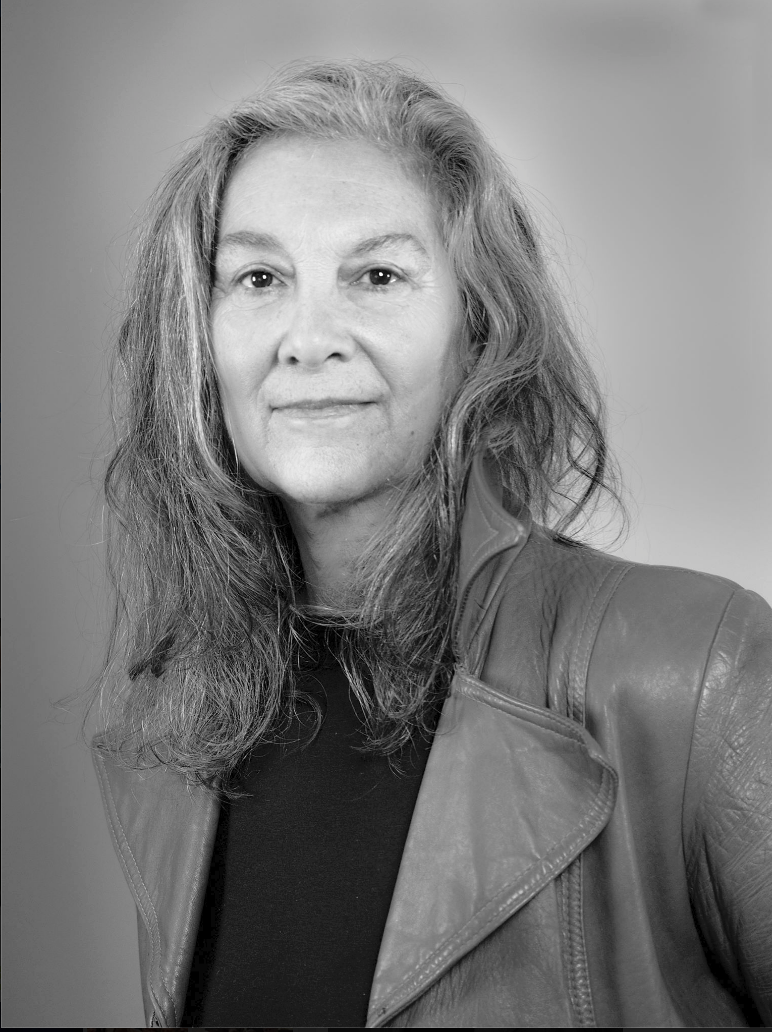
- Wolf in 2016
- Born: Linda Ann Wolf; 1950 (age 75–76); Los Angeles, California, U.S.
- Education: Institute for American Universities; L'Ecole Experimental Photographic; Evergreen State College
- Occupations: Photographer; writer
- Spouse: Eric Kuhner
- Children: 3
- Website: lindawolf.net

Linda Ann Wolf (born 1950) is an American photographer and writer. She was one of the first female rock and roll photographers. She does fine art photography with an emphasis on women, street photography, and global, ethnographic photojournalism.

== Early life and education ==
Wolf was born in Los Angeles in 1950 and grew up in Sherman Oaks, California. She is the mother of musician, Heather Wolf, and Genevieve Herrickwolf. Her mother, Barbara Wolf (née Friedman), was a poet, a fashion model, and an English literature teacher at Beverly Hills High School. Her father, Joseph Wolf, was a businessman and avid photographer. Linda's interest in photography was born out of her father's passion for photography. He bought her first camera for her when she was a teenager.

Linda Wolf graduated from Hollywood High School in 1968. In 1969, she began dating Sandy Konikoff, the drummer for the Gentle Soul, Bob Dylan, and Jackson Browne. Konikoff invited her to live at the legendary music commune, Paxton Lodge, the brainchild Frazier Mohawk where Elektra Records set up an experimental studio to record one of Browne's first albums. There was a darkroom at the studio where she saw photos being printed for the first time. Inspired by the experience, she made the decision to pursue photography professionally.

Wolf's grandfather, Jules Wolf, managed the historic Lincoln Theater, often called the Apollo of the West. From 1970 to 1975, she lived and studied in Provence, France, attending the Institute for American Universities and L'Ecole Experimental Photographic.

Her early photographic work in France focused on people and village life in the Vaucluse Mountains. Next, Wolf attended Evergreen State College in Olympia, Washington. She taught photography through the University of California at Los Angeles Extension and worked as a staff photographer for the Los Angeles Citywide Mural Project.

== Rock and roll photography ==
=== 1969 – Fanny ===
In 1969, Wolf began working at Warner Bros./Reprise Records, where she met the first all-girl rock band to sign with a major record label, Fanny. She became friends with the band and she moved in with the group at Fanny Hill, a mansion on Marmont Lane in Hollywood, where she lived for a year and a half as the band's documentary photographer. Over 80 of Wolf's archival photos of Fanny are presented in the documentary of the band, Fanny: The Right to Rock During her stay, she met Lowell George who started Little Feat and the band members from Little Feat. She photographed them as well.

=== 1970 – Joe Cocker: Mad Dogs & Englishmen tour ===
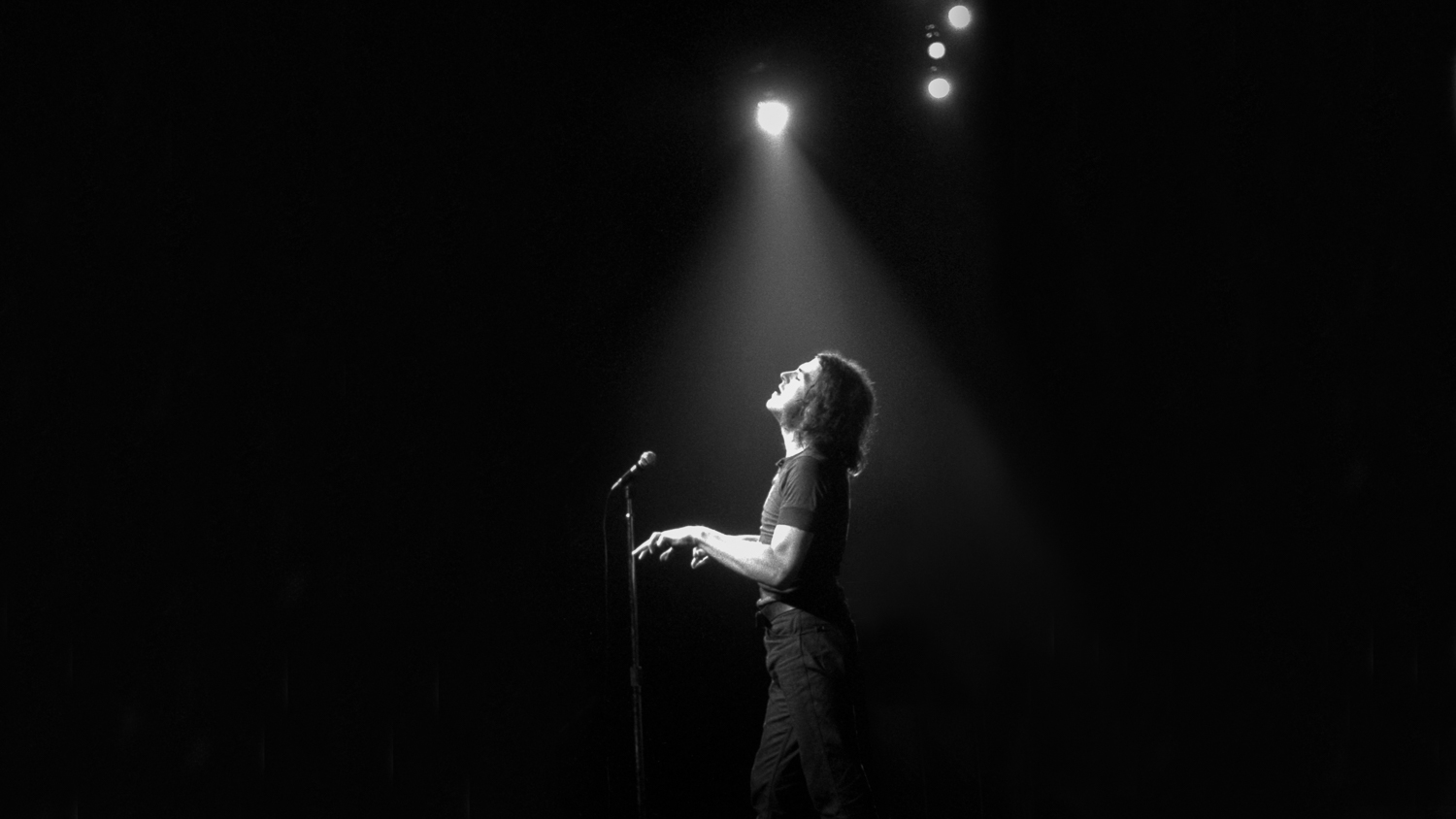
Joe Cocker, photographed by Wolf in 1970

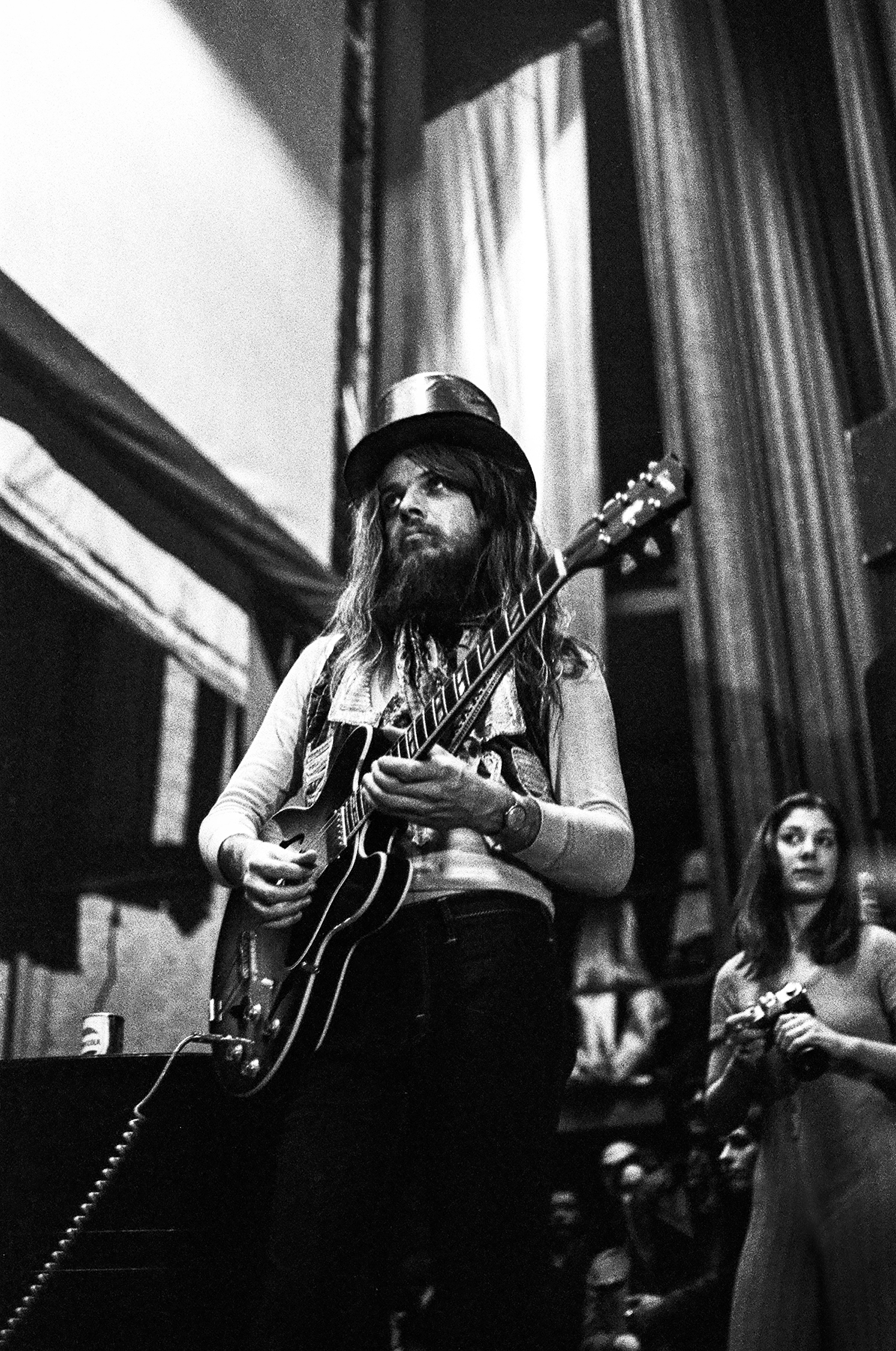
Leon Russell and Wolf, on tour in 1970

Wolf met Joe Cocker a week before the Joe Cocker: Mad Dogs & Englishmen tour began. He had just arrived in the U.S. and was staying with his roadie and keyboard player at Leon Russell's house. His record label informed him that he was to start a U.S. tour in six days, but he had just recently left his band, The Grease Band. Russell offered to quickly assemble a touring band and recruited over 40 of his friends. Denny Cordell, who produced the tour, invited Wolf along after seeing her photography. She and Andee Nathanson were the two official photographers for the two-month U.S. concert tour which included Russell, Rita Coolidge, Chris Stainton, Claudia Lennear, Bobby Keys, Pamela Polland, Matthew Moore, and musicians representing the Tulsa Sound including Carl Radle, Jim Keltner, and Chuck Blackwell.

The music documentary Joe Cocker: Mad Dogs & Englishmen was released in 1971 and credited Wolf for her tour photography. She wrote Joe Cocker: Mad Dogs & Englishmen: A Memory Book, which included over 150 new photographs, quotes and stories from alumni. It was released in 2015 at the Lockn' Festival.

On September 11, 2015, Wolf joined the Tedeschi Trucks Band & Friends and alumni from the 1970 Mad Dogs & Englishmen Tour, as the official photographer, and sang in the encore with the Space Choir, for a tribute concert to honor Joe Cocker and the Mad Dogs and Englishmen music. Participating alumni included Leon Russell, Rita Coolidge, Claudia Lennear, Chris Stainton, and Pamela Polland.

Cocker died on December 22, 2014, and Wolf's photographs were used in Associated Press articles written about his life and music legacy.

=== 2020 – Tribute: Cocker Power ===
On April 28, 2020, Insight Editions released Tribute: Cocker Power, a 335-page coffee table book featuring Wolf's documentary photos, tour alumni stories, and vignettes from the Joe Cocker: Mad Dogs & Englishmen Tour and the 2015 tribute concert at the Lockn' Festival led by the Tedeschi Trucks Band with Leon Russell and original tour alumni. The book, which received favorable reviews, was released on the 50th anniversary of the tour. It includes contributions from over one hundred musicians and crew members, including Denny Cordell, Leon Russell, Chris Stainton, Rita Coolidge, Claudia Lennear, Derek Trucks, Susan Tedeschi, and Warren Haynes.

== Public art projects ==
In the late 1970s and early 1980s, Wolf created a public art project of murals consisting of photos of ordinary people sitting on bus benches. The photographs were placed on the sides of buses and the backs of bus benches in Los Angeles, San Diego, and Oakland, California in the U.S., and in Arles, France. The benches were conceived as a response to the dehumanizing effects of advertising; they were exhibited in numerous venues including the Los Angeles Municipal Art Gallery and the Rencontres International Festival of Photography in Arles. One of the benches sits in the courtyard of Musée Réattu as part of their permanent collection in Arles.

Wolf then developed the project L.A. Welcomes the World, a series of large-scale multicultural portraits of people presented on billboards throughout Los Angeles, for the 1984 Summer Olympics, which was sponsored by Eastman Kodak.

== Organizations ==
- 1981 – Co-founder of Women in Photography International, which is archived in Yale University's Beinecke Rare Book and Manuscript Library, Peter E. Palmquist Collection
- 1993 – Co-founder of The Daughters Sisters Project, now called Teen Talking Circles, a non-profit organization supporting girl's empowerment, gender relationships, and youth activism

== Publications ==
=== Books by Wolf ===
- Tribute: Cocker Power (Insight Editions, 2000)
- Daughters of the Moon, Sisters of the Sun: Young Women and Mentors on the Transition to Womanhood (New Society, 1997)
- Global Uprising: Confronting the Tyrannies of the 21st Century: Stories from a New Generation of Activists (New Society, 2001)
- Speaking and Listening From the Heart, The Art of Facilitating Teen Talking Circles (2005)–with Neva Welton

=== Films by Wolf ===
- Bridge of Glass: My mother and me: the relationship with my mother, poet, Barbara Wolf (2012)

=== Books with contributions by Wolf ===
- Twenty-Four Hours in the Life of LA - Alfred van der Marck (1984)
- Leon Russell - Tulsa Area Music Archives (2010)
- Rock and Roll Hall of Fame Induction Video: Joe Cocker, Mad Dogs and Englishmen (film, 1970) (2011)
- Making Wet: The Magazine of Gourmet Bathing - Imperfect (2012)
- Willin': The Story of Little Feat - Da Capo (2013)
- Land of a Thousand Bridges: The June Millington Autobiography (2015)
- Delta Lady: the Autobiography of Rita Coolidge (2016)
- Intensa Levedad: Pury Estalayo (2017)

== Films ==
=== Documentary shorts featuring Wolf's photography ===
- SOLA Spotlight Video (2024)
- I Am A Full Woman (2014)
- Joe Cocker Mad Dogs & Englishmen Memory Book (2015)
- The Caravan: Seeking Asylum in the United States (2018)
- Tribute: Cocker Power (2020)

=== Films with contributions by Wolf ===
- Twenty Feet From Stardom: Leon Russell Montage (2012)
- Joe Cocker: Mad Dog with Soul (2017)
- Learning to Live Together: The Return of Mad Dogs & Englishmen (2021)
- Leon Russell: The Master of Space and Time (2023)
- Fanny: The Right to Rock (2023)
- Little Feat: The Documentary (2026)

== Awards ==
- 2023 recipient of a SOLA Award. SOLA's mission is "to award cash grants to female visual artists over 60 who are currently living in Washington State and have created a body of work spanning at least 25 years."

== Collections ==
Wolf's photographs are held in the following permanent collections:

- Musee Reattu, Arles, France
- Musee Cantini, Marseille, France
- Musee Het Sterkshof, Antwerp, Belgium
- Bibliothèque Nationale de France, Paris
- Rock & Roll Hall of Fame, Cleveland, Ohio
- Norton Museum of Art, Palm Beach, California
- Women's Building, Los Angeles
- Photographic Center of the Tokyo Fuji Art Museum, Tokyo
- Harborview Medical Center Hand Wing Gallery, Seattle

== Exhibitions ==
=== Solo exhibitions ===
- La Chapelle des Penitents Bleus, Aix-en-Provence, France, 1972
- Le Chateau de Goult, Aix-en-Provence, France, 1973
- L'Ancienne Poste, Goult, France, 1973
- Grace Church; Global Portraits, Bainbridge Island, Washington, 2013

=== Group exhibitions: 1980–2021 ===
- USC Fisher Galley Museum of Art, Sight Specific: LACPS and the Politics of Community, Los Angeles
- National Museum of Women in the Arts: Women who Rock, Washington, D.C.
- L.A.C.E., Los Angeles Contemporary Exhibitions, Los Angeles
- Rencontres Photographique de la photographie, arles France
- Sala San José de Caracciolos de la Universidad de Alcalá, Madrid, Spain
- Bainbridge Island Museum of Art: "Women in Photography", Bainbridge Island, Washington
- Bainbridge Island Museum of Art: "Breathe" Bainbridge Island, Washington
- Bus Bench Mural Project, Rencontres d'Arles, Arles, France, 1981
- Multicultural Focus, Los Angeles Municipal Art Gallery, Barnsdall Park.
- The 12 artists from the original Los Angeles Municipal Art Gallery were brought back together to show new work in Refocus: Multicultural Focus: an initiative of the J.Paul Getty's Pacific Standard Time, Arena 1 Gallery, 2012

=== Exhibitions curated by Wolf ===
- Women in Photography, conceived and co-curated by Wolf, Bainbridge Island Museum of Art, 2017. Included many of her own photographs.
