= I Can Stand a Little Rain =

Studio album by Joe Cocker
- Released: 7 August 1974
- Recorded: 1973−1974 in Los Angeles
- Genre: Rock
- Length: 34:29
- Label: A&M
- Producer: Jim Price

Joe Cocker chronology
Joe Cocker (1972)	I Can Stand a Little Rain (1974)	Jamaica Say You Will (1975)

Singles from I Can Stand a Little Rain
- 1. "Put Out the Light" Released: June 1974; 2. "I Can Stand a Little Rain" Released: October 1974; 3. "You Are So Beautiful" Released: 2 November 1974

Professional ratings
Review scores
Source	Rating
AllMusic	3/5 stars
Christgau's Record Guide	C
Džuboks	(Favorable)

I Can Stand a Little Rain is the fourth studio album by English singer Joe Cocker, released in August 1974, and occasionally considered to be the singer's finest album in that decade.

== Background ==
In 1973, in the midst of uncertainty career-wise, Joe Cocker teamed up with Jim Price, a trumpet player turned producer, who had previously been member of Cocker's touring band.

"Jim rekindled my interest," Cocker said in an interview for "Blank Space" in 1979. "Jim called and played me 'You Are So Beautiful', he just came round the house and said, 'What's wrong?' And he played me 'I Can Stand a Little Rain,' which turned out to be the title of the album. The two things that kind of re-fired me into work again, and consequently drove me insane in the process."

I Can Stand a Little Rain found the singer working with top songwriters and session players, including Chuck Rainey, Cornell Dupree and Bernard Purdie, as well as future Toto founder members David Paich and Jeff Porcaro. Some of the writers, like Randy Newman and Jimmy Webb, ended up performing on Cocker's covers of their songs. The album is, however, particularly noticeable for the song "You Are So Beautiful", originally released on Billy Preston's The Kids & Me album. Ultimately, it went on to become one of Cocker's bigger hits, reaching No. 5 on the Billboard Hot 100, proving this album to eventually become a hit.

The original idea was that of a double album but A&M did not approve of it. The rest of the songs recorded during the sessions were released in April 1975 on Cocker's next album Jamaica Say You Will, which was not equally successful.

In 2013, "The Moon's a Harsh Mistress" was re-recorded by Jimmy Webb in a duet with Joe Cocker. It turned out to be Cocker's final recorded performance.

== Track listing ==
Side one

No.	Title	Writer(s)	Length
1.	"Put Out the Light"	Daniel Moore	4:11
2.	"I Can Stand a Little Rain"	Jim Price	3:33
3.	"I Get Mad"	Joe Cocker, Jim Price	3:38
4.	"Sing Me a Song"	Henry McCullough	2:25
5.	"The Moon Is a Harsh Mistress"	Jimmy Webb	3:31

Side two

No.	Title	Writer(s)	Length
6.	"Don't Forget Me"	Harry Nilsson	3:19
7.	"You Are So Beautiful"	Billy Preston, Bruce Fisher	2:39
8.	"It's a Sin (When You Love Somebody)"	Jimmy Webb	3:49
9.	"Performance"	Allen Toussaint	4:39
10.	"Guilty"	Randy Newman	2:46

== Personnel ==
- Joe Cocker – lead vocals
- David Paich – acoustic piano (1, 8)
- Nicky Hopkins – acoustic piano (2, 6-7)
- Richard Tee – acoustic piano (3), organ (3)
- Jimmy Webb – acoustic piano (5)
- Peggy Sandvig – organ (6)
- Greg Mathieson – acoustic piano (9)
- Randy Newman – acoustic piano (10)
- Ralph Hammer – guitar (1)
- Ray Parker Jr. – guitar (1, 8-9)
- Jay Graydon – guitar (2, 4, 8-9)
- Henry McCullough – guitar (2, 6)
- Cornell Dupree – guitar (3)
- Dave McDaniel – bass guitar (1-2, 7–9)
- Chuck Rainey – bass guitar (3)
- Chris Stewart – bass guitar (4, 6)
- Ollie E. Brown – drums (1, 8-9)
- Jeff Porcaro – drums (2, 6)
- Bernard Purdie – drums (3)
- Jimmy Karstein – drums (4)
- Jim Horn – alto saxophone (1, 3)
- Trevor Lawrence – tenor saxophone (1, 3)
- Jim Price – trombone (1, 3), acoustic piano (4), organ (4)
- Mayo Tiana – trombone (1, 3)
- Stuart Blumberg – trumpet (1, 3)
- Steve Madaio – trumpet (1, 3)
- Daniel Moore – backing vocals (1)
- Merry Clayton – backing vocals (2)
- Venetta Fields – backing vocals (2, 4, 8-9)
- Clydie King – backing vocals (2, 4, 8-9)
- Sherlie Matthews – backing vocals (2, 4, 8-9)

== Production ==
- Producer and Arrangements – Jim Price
- Mostly recorded at The Village Recorder, West Los Angeles, 1973 (Tracks 1 & 7–10) / 1974 (Tracks 2–6).
- Engineers – Mario Aglietti, Rob Fraboni, Rick Heenan, J.J. Jansen, Nat Jeffrey, Carlton Lee, Ken Klinger, Joe Tuzen and Zak Zenor.
- Mixing – Rob Fraboni
- Mastered by Kent Duncan at Kendun Recorders (Burbank, CA).
- Art Direction – Roland Young
- Design – Chuck Beeson
- Photography – Steve Vaughan

== Charts ==
Chart (1974)	Peak position
Australian Albums (Kent Music Report)	11
Canada Top Albums/CDs (RPM)	9
Italian Albums (Musica e Dischi)	12
US Billboard 200	11
