= Joe Cocker! =

Studio album by Joe Cocker
- Released: 5 November 1969
- Recorded: 1969
- Studios: A&M (Hollywood); Sunset Sound (Hollywood)
- Genres: Blues rock, soul
- Length: 35:26
- Labels: Regal Zonophone (UK); A&M (US); Stateside (France); Cube (Germany)
- Producers: Denny Cordell, Leon Russell

Joe Cocker chronology
With a Little Help from My Friends (1969)	Joe Cocker! (1969)	Mad Dogs and Englishmen (1970)

Singles from Joe Cocker!
- 1. "Delta Lady" Released: October 1969; 2. "She Came In Through the Bathroom Window" Released: December 1969

Professional ratings
Review scores
Source	Rating
AllMusic	4/5 stars
Rolling Stone	(favourable)
The Rolling Stone Record Guide	5/5 stars
The Village Voice	A

Joe Cocker! is the second studio album by English singer Joe Cocker, released in November 1969. Following the template of his first LP, the album features numerous covers of songs originally performed by Bob Dylan ("Dear Landlord"), the Beatles ("She Came in Through the Bathroom Window" and "Something" – both released almost simultaneously with original versions; "Let It Be" was also recorded and released as a B-side), Leonard Cohen ("Bird on the Wire"), and future touring partner Leon Russell ("Delta Lady" and “Hello Little Friend”). Cocker also co-wrote one song, "That's Your Business Now", with Chris Stainton, who was a frequent songwriting partner.

Cocker is backed by the Grease Band, two of whom, Chris Stainton and Henry McCullough, appeared on his first album. The Grease Band backed the singer at the Woodstock Festival in August 1969. However, Cocker would part ways with the group following the release of this record, citing a reluctance to tour; when they needed to meet live commitments in America, Cocker decided to organise a new band (the Mad Dogs and Englishmen) with the help of keyboardist Leon Russell, heralding a new musical direction for the singer on his subsequent studio releases.

The album charted in the UK in May 1972 at number 29 when it was re-released as a double pack with Cocker's first LP With a Little Help from My Friends. On its release, the album also charted at number 11 on the Billboard 200 in America, propelled by Cocker's well-received appearance with the Grease Band at Woodstock earlier in the year.

"Delta Lady" was released as a single and reached No. 10 in the UK singles chart.

== Track listing ==
Side one
No.	Title	Writer(s)	Length
1.	"Dear Landlord"	Bob Dylan	3:23
2.	"Bird on the Wire"	Leonard Cohen	4:30
3.	"Lawdy Miss Clawdy"	Lloyd Price	2:15
4.	"She Came In Through the Bathroom Window"	John Lennon, Paul McCartney	2:37
5.	"Hitchcock Railway"	Don Dunn, Tony McCashen	4:41

Side two
No.	Title	Writer(s)	Length
6.	"That's Your Business Now"	Joe Cocker, Chris Stainton	2:56
7.	"Something"	George Harrison	3:32
8.	"Delta Lady"	Leon Russell	2:51
9.	"Hello, Little Friend"	Leon Russell	3:52
10.	"Darling Be Home Soon"	John Sebastian	4:49
Total length:			35:26

Outtakes released as B-sides
No.	Title	Writer(s)	Length
1.	"She's So Good to Me"	Joe Cocker, Chris Stainton	2:56
2.	"Let It Be"	John Lennon, Paul McCartney	5:05

== Personnel ==
- Joe Cocker – vocals
- Chris Stainton – piano, organ, guitar, arrangements
- Leon Russell – piano, organ, guitar, arrangements
- Henry McCullough, Clarence White – guitar
- Sneaky Pete Kleinow – pedal steel guitar
- Alan Spenner – bass guitar
- Bruce Rowland, Paul Humphrey (miscredited as "Paul Humphries") – drums
- Milt Holland – percussion
- Merry Clayton, Bonnie Bramlett, Rita Coolidge, Patrice Holloway, Sherlie Matthews – backing vocals
- Jimmy Page – pedal steel guitar on "She Came In Through The Bathroom Window"

== Production notes ==
- Recorded at A&M Studios, Hollywood, CA, and Sunset Sound Studios, Hollywood, CA, 1969
- Produced by Denny Cordell and Leon Russell
- Engineered by Henry Lewy, Brian Ingoldsby
- Remixed and remastered by Glyn Johns

== Charts ==
Chart (1969-79)	Peak position
Canada Top Albums/CDs (RPM)	10
US Billboard 200	11

Chart (1972)	Peak position
UK Albums (Official Charts)	29

== Certifications ==
Region	Certification	Certified units/sales
United States (RIAA)	Gold	500,000^{^}
^{^} Shipments figures based on certification alone.
