= Jamaica Say You Will =

Studio album by Joe Cocker
- Released: 22 April 1975
- Recorded: 1974
- Studios: The Village Recorder, Los Angeles, California
- Genre: Rock
- Length: 39:14
- Labels: Cube (UK & Europe); A&M (USA)
- Producer: Jim Price

Joe Cocker chronology
I Can Stand a Little Rain (1974)	Jamaica Say You Will (1975)	The Best of the Early Joe Cocker (1976)

Professional ratings
Review scores
Source	Rating
Christgau's Record Guide	C

Jamaica Say You Will is the fifth studio album by English singer Joe Cocker, released in April 1975. The songs from the album come from the same sessions that produced the highly acclaimed LP I Can Stand A Little Rain (1974). Jamaica Say You Will wasn't, however, as successful as its predecessor. It reached number 42 on the US album charts.

It includes participation by Randy Newman; rhythm section on most of the songs is played by the Kingpins, formerly known for being saxophonist King Curtis' backing band, including Bernard "Pretty" Purdie on drums. "(That's What I Like) In My Woman" is a fast-driven song with horns, "Where Am I Now" and "I Think It's Going to Rain Today" are segued and complementary - the sentiment of each song reflected in the other. "Oh Mama" is pure vocal blues, accompanied by a saxophone. The over-all influence is soul and blues. The album winds up acoustically, with a simply arranged, folk-flavoured tune, "Jack-a-Diamonds".

== Track listing ==
1. "(That's What I Like) In My Woman" (Matthew Moore) – 3:24
2. "Where Am I Now" (Jesse Ed Davis) – 4:14
3. "I Think It's Going to Rain Today" (Randy Newman) – 3:59
4. "Forgive Me Now" (Matthew Moore) – 3:24
5. "Oh Mama" (Jim Price) – 4:10
6. "Lucinda" (Randy Newman) – 3:53
7. "If I Love You" (Daniel Moore) – 3:55
8. "Jamaica, Say You Will" (Jackson Browne) – 4:15
9. "It's All Over But the Shoutin'" (Joe Hinton, Johnny Bristol, James Dean) – 3:54
10. "Jack-a-Diamonds" (Daniel Moore) – 3:35

== Personnel ==
- Joe Cocker – lead vocals
- Richard Tee – acoustic piano (1, 4-5, 7–9), organ (1, 5, 7–9), arrangements (1)
- Nicky Hopkins – acoustic piano (2)
- Jean Roussel – organ (2)
- Peggy Sandvig – acoustic piano (3, 6), additional orchestration (3)
- Cornell Dupree – guitar (1, 4-5, 8-9)
- Ben Benay – guitar (2, 3), harmonica (6)
- Dan Sawyer – guitar (3)
- Henry McCullough – guitar (6)
- Chuck Rainey – bass guitar (1, 4-5, 7–9)
- Chrissy Stewart – bass guitar (2)
- Dave McDaniel – bass guitar (3, 6)
- Bernard Purdie – drums (1, 4-5, 7–9)
- Jimmy Karstein – drums (2, 6)
- Joe Correro – drums (3)
- Don Poncher – percussion (9)
- Jim Horn – alto saxophone (1, 5, 8)
- Bobby Keys – tenor saxophone (9)
- Trevor Lawrence – tenor saxophone (9)
- Jim Price – arrangements, trombone (1), backing vocals (1, 3, 5-6, 8-9), brass (3), organ (6)
- Steve Madaio – trumpet (9)
- The Sid Sharp Strings – strings (3-4)
- Buzz Clifford – backing vocals (1, 2, 9)
- Daniel Moore – backing vocals (1–9), additional choral arrangements (1, 9), guitar (10), foot stomping (10)
- Matthew Moore – backing vocals (1, 3–6, 8-9)
- Carol Stallings – backing vocals (1-2, 9)
- Venetta Fields – backing vocals (2)
- Clydie King – backing vocals (2)
- Sherlie Matthews – backing vocals (2)
- Jim Moore – backing vocals (4)
- Cynthia Barclay – backing vocals (6)
- Joanne Bell – backing vocals (6)

== Production ==
- Producer – Jim Price
- Recorded and mixed at The Village Recorder (Los Angeles, CA), 1973/1974.
- Engineers – Mark Aglietti, Terry Becker, Rob Fraboni, Rick Hennan, J.J, Jansen, Nat Jeffrey, Ken Klinger, Tim Kramer, Carlton Lee, Ed Lever, Jim Price, Joe Tuzen and Zak Zenor.
- Mixing – Zak Zenor (Tracks 1, 4, 6, 8, 9 & 10); Rob Fraboni (Tracks 2, 3 & 7); Rob Fraboni and Joe Tuzen (Track 5).
- Mastered by Allen Zentz at Allen Zentz Mastering (Hollywood, CA).
- Art Direction – Roland Young
- Design – Chuck Beeson
- Front Cover Photo – Steve Silverstein
- Inner Sleeve Photos – Gail Mezey

== Chart performance ==
Year	Chart	Position
1975	US Billboard	42
