= Joe Cocker (album) =

Studio album by Joe Cocker
- Released: November 1972
- Recorded: 1971–1972
- Genres: Blues rock, Southern rock
- Length: 42:28
- Labels: A&M; SP 4368
- Producers: Denny Cordell and Nigel Thomas

Joe Cocker chronology
Mad Dogs & Englishmen (1970)	Joe Cocker (1972)	I Can Stand a Little Rain (1974)

Singles from Joe Cocker
- 1. "High Time We Went" b/w "Black-Eyed Blues A&M 1258"; 2. "Midnight Rider" b/w "Woman to Woman A&M 1370"

Professional ratings
Review scores
Source	Rating
Allmusic	3/5 stars
Christgau's Record Guide	B+

Joe Cocker is the self-titled third studio album by the English singer Joe Cocker, released in 1972 in Europe as Something to Say on Cube Records, and in the US as Joe Cocker on A&M Records. It contains the hit single "High Time We Went", that was released in the summer of 1971. Joe Cocker signalled Cocker's change of direction into a more jazzy, blues style. The album reached no. 30 in the US album charts. However, although it received a positive response from the press, it made no impression on the British and European charts.

One of the album tracks, "Woman to Woman", was the basis for Tupac Shakur's successful hit single "California Love".

The album, re-titled as Something to Say, was originally released on CD in 1990 by Castle Communications and in 1998 a remastered edition of the album was released worldwide on A&M Records. Alan White, soon to be Yes' drummer, played on this album alongside Jim Keltner, after he was featured on George Harrison's All Things Must Pass and John Lennon's Live Peace in Toronto, Imagine and Sometime in New-York City albums. Conrad Isidore played with Steve Stills and Hummingbird, among others. Percussionist Rebop Kwaku Baah was known for his work with Traffic and the German band Can.

== Track listing ==
All tracks composed by Joe Cocker and Chris Stainton, except where indicated.

Side one

1. "Pardon Me Sir" – 3:17
2. "High Time We Went" – 4:25
3. "She Don't Mind" – 3:13
4. "Black-Eyed Blues" – 4:37
5. "Something to Say" (Joe Cocker, Peter Nicholls) – 5:00

Side two

1. "Midnight Rider" (Gregg Allman, Robert Payne) – 4:00
2. "Do Right Woman" (live) (Dan Penn, Chips Moman) – 7:00
3. "Woman to Woman" – 4:26
4. "St. James Infirmary" (live) (Traditional, Frank Assunto; arranged by Chris Stainton and Joe Cocker) – 6:10

The cover version of Gregg Allman's "Midnight Rider" charted on the Billboard Hot 100, peaking at number 27. The b-side of that single, "Woman to Woman" also charted (peaking at number 56), as did the follow-up single, "Pardon Me Sir", which peaked at number 51. "High Time We Went" and "Black-Eyed Blues" had been released as a single in May 1971, peaking at number 22 on the Billboard chart.

In 1996, the horn-and-piano riff from "Woman to Woman" was sampled by Tupac Shakur in his song "California Love"; it was a smash hit for Tupac, reaching No. 1 on the Billboard Hot 100.

== Personnel ==
- Joe Cocker – lead vocals, arrangements (9)
- Chris Stainton – acoustic piano, Hammond organ, arrangements (9)
- Neil Hubbard – guitars
- Alan Spenner – bass
- Jim Keltner – drums
- Alan White – drums
- Conrad Isidore – drums (7, 9)
- Felix "Flaco" Falcon – assorted percussion
- Rebop Kwaku Baah – congas (7)
- Fred Scerbo – saxophone
- Milton Sloan – saxophone
- Jim Horn – saxophone (7)
- Rick Alfonso (incorrectly spelled Alphonso on the album cover) – trumpet
- Virginia Ayers – backing vocals
- Beverly Gardner – backing vocals
- Gloria Jones – backing vocals
- Viola Wills – backing vocals, lead vocals (7)

(A sticker placed on original issue albums read "Featuring the Chris Stainton Band and the Sanctified Sisters")

== Production notes ==
- All songs recorded in 1972, except "High Time We Went" and "Black-Eyed Blues", which were recorded August 1970, and first released on a single in May 1971; "Do Right Woman" and "St. James Infirmary" were recorded live.
- Denny Cordell – producer (1–6, 9)
- Nigel Thomas – producer (6–9)
- Roland Young – art direction
- John Cabalka – design
- Peter Smith – photography

== Charts ==
Chart (1972–1973)	Peak position
Australian Albums (Kent Music Report)	11
Canada Top Albums/CDs (RPM)	28
German Albums (Offizielle Top 100)	50
Italian Albums (Musica e Dischi)	4
US Billboard 200	30
