= New York City (You're a Woman) =

Studio album by Al Kooper
- Released: June 1971
- Recorded: 1971
- Studio: Trident Studios, London; Columbia Studios, Hollywood, California
- Genre: Rock
- Length: 42:53
- Label: Columbia
- Producer: Al Kooper

Al Kooper chronology
Easy Does It (1970)	New York City (You're a Woman) (1971)	A Possible Projection of the Future / Childhood's End (1972)

Singles from New York City (You're a Woman)
- 1. "New York City (You're a Woman)" Released: July 1971; 2. "Medley: Oo Wee Baby, I Love You / Love Is A Man's Best Friend" Released: November 1971

Professional ratings
Review scores
Source	Rating
AllMusic	4.5/5 stars

New York City (You're a Woman) is the fourth album by American singer-songwriter Al Kooper for Columbia Records, recorded and released in 1971.

== Background ==
The album was recorded with two separate groups, one in Los Angeles, California (which produced eight tracks) and the other in London, England (which produced three). It was inspired by the likes of Elton John (whose "Come Down in Time" is covered), The Beatles and Neil Young. Kooper trotted out a more subdued sound than on his previous albums, recorded without the horns and orchestrations. He kept to his normal format of original compositions interspersed with covers, including the traditional folk-song "500 Miles". Among the best-known tracks from the album is the title track, the only released portion of the presumably unfinished New York City: 6 A.M. to Midnight project.

== Track listing ==
1. "New York City (You're a Woman)" (Al Kooper) – 5:20
2. "John the Baptist (Holy John)" (Kooper, Phyllis Major) – 3:34
3. "Can You Hear It Now (500 Miles)" (Traditional, arranged by Kooper) – 3:27
4. "The Ballad of the Hard Rock Kid" (Kooper) – 4:19
5. "Going Quietly Mad" (Kooper) – 3:54
6. Medley
  "Oo Wee Baby, I Love You" (Richard Parker) – 1:59
  "Love Is A Man's Best Friend" (Irwin Levine, Kooper) – 2:24
7. "Back on My Feet" (Kooper) – 3:22
8. "Come Down in Time" (Bernie Taupin, Elton John) – 4:39
9. "Dearest Darling" (Bo Diddley) – 3:55
10. "Nightmare #5" (Kooper) – 3:00
11. "The Warning (Someone's on the Cross Again)" (Kooper, Phyllis Major) – 3:00

== Personnel ==
=== Musicians ===
- Al Kooper – piano, organ, guitar, mellotron, harmonium, vocals
- Paul Humphrey – drums (tracks 2–4, 6–9, 11)
- Bobbye Hall Porter – percussion (tracks 2–4, 6–9, 11)
- Louis Shelton – guitar (tracks 2–4, 6–8, 11)
- Terry Kath – guitar solo (track 3)
- Carol Kaye – electric bass (tracks 2, 4, 7, 9, 11)
- Herbie Flowers – electric bass (tracks 1, 5, 8, 10)
- Bobby West – acoustic and electric bass (tracks 3, 6, 8)
- Roger Pope – drums (tracks 1, 5, 10)
- Sneaky Pete Kleinow – pedal steel (tracks 4, 11)
- Caleb Quaye – guitar (tracks 5, 10)
- Various combinations of Rita Coolidge, Venetta Fields, Clydie King, Donna Weiss, Julia Tillman Waters, Edna Wright, Maxine Willard Waters, Lorna Willard, Edna Woods, Claudia Lennear, Dorothy Morrison, Robbie Montgomery, Jessie Smith, Robert John, Michael Gately and Jay Siegel – backing vocals (tracks 2–3, 6–9, 11)

=== Technical ===
- Al Kooper – producer
- Doug Pomeroy, Frank Laico, Ken Scott, Mark Friedman, Sy Mitchell – engineers
- Richard Avedon – cover photography
- John Berg – design
