= A Possible Projection of the Future / Childhood's End =

Studio album by Al Kooper
- Released: April 1972
- Recorded: January–March 1972
- Studio: AIR Studios, London; Trident Studios, London
- Genre: Rock
- Length: 40:19
- Label: Columbia
- Producer: Al Kooper

Al Kooper chronology
New York City (You're a Woman) (1971)	A Possible Projection of the Future / Childhood's End (1972)	Naked Songs (1973)

Singles from A Possible Projection of the Future / Childhood's End
- 1. "The Monkey Time" Released: February 25, 1972

Professional ratings
Review scores
Source	Rating
AllMusic	3/5 stars
Newsday	B+

A Possible Projection of the Future / Childhood's End is American musician Al Kooper's fifth album, recorded for and released by Columbia Records in 1972.

Begun with a vague storyline that failed to survive beyond the two title tracks, the album was recorded in London, England at George Martin's AIR Studios with one outtake from New York City (You're A Woman). Six original tracks were surrounded by covers of Bob Dylan ("The Man in Me", which Kooper had originally produced), Smokey Robinson ("Swept For You Baby") and even Jimmy Cliff ("Please Tell Me Why").

The album cover showed Kooper as an eighty-year-old man, decrepit and clutching a Fender Jaguar guitar.

== Track listing ==
All tracks composed by Al Kooper; except where indicated

1. "A Possible Projection of the Future" – 6:29
2. "The Man in Me" (Bob Dylan) – 3:42
3. "Fly On" – 3:15
4. "Please Tell Me Why" (Guilly Bright, Jimmy Cliff) – 4:40
5. "The Monkey Time" (Curtis Mayfield) – 3:20
6. "Let Your Love Shine" – 4:04
7. "Swept for You Baby" (Smokey Robinson) – 3:32
8. "Bended Knees (Please Don't Leave Me Now)" – 3:40
9. "Love Trap" – 4:04
10. "Childhood's End" – 3:33

== Personnel ==
=== Musicians ===
- Al Kooper – acoustic and electric piano, organ, guitar, ARP, VCS3 and Moog synthesizer, Mellotron, tambourine, sitar, vocals
- Harvey Brooks – electric bass tracks recorded in America
- Herbie Flowers – electric bass tracks recorded in England
- Barry Morgan – drums
- Alan Parker – acoustic guitar
- Claudia Lennear, Linda Lewis, Michael Gately and Robert John – backing vocals
- Bobby West – electric bass (track 7)
- Paul Humphrey – drums (track 7)
- Bobbye Hall Porter – percussion on (track 7)
- Clydie King, Venetta Fields, Oma Drake and Edna Wright – backing vocals on (track 7)
- John Punter - spoken introduction (track 1)

=== Technical ===
- Al Kooper – producer
- John Punter – engineer
- Mark Levine – engineer
- Ron Coro – design
