= Leon Russell and the Shelter People =

Studio album by Leon Russell
- Released: May 3, 1971
- Recorded: August 23–26, September, December 23, 1970, and January 1971
- Studios: Island (London); A&M (Hollywood); Skyhill/Shelter (Hollywood); Muscle Shoals (Sheffield, Alabama)
- Genre: Rock and roll
- Length: 42:12
- Labels: Shelter (US); A&M (UK)
- Producers: Leon Russell, Denny Cordell

Leon Russell chronology
Leon Russell (1970)	Leon Russell and the Shelter People (1971)	Asylum Choir II (1971)

Singles from Leon Russell and the Shelter People
- 1. "The Ballad of Mad Dogs and Englishmen" Released: 1971; 2. "A Hard Rain's a-Gonna Fall" Released: 1971; 3. "Stranger in a Strange Land" Released: 1971

Leon Russell and the Shelter People is the second solo album by Leon Russell. Released in 1971, it peaked at number 17 on the Billboard Hot 200 in the United States. The album has gold certification for sales of over 500,000 albums in the US and Canada.

"The Ballad of Mad Dogs and Englishmen" is a song written by Russell from the soundtrack of the 1971 film Mad Dogs & Englishmen.

The Shelter People referenced in the album title are the session musicians for Shelter Records, the label founded by Russell and Denny Cordell in 1969. However, only five of the album's eleven tracks are credited to them. Of the remaining tracks, two are credited to the "Muscle Shoals Swampers", two to "Friends In England" and one to "Tulsa Tops". "The Ballad of Mad Dogs and Englishmen" features only Russell on vocals and piano with a string backing.

== Reception ==
Professional ratings
Review scores
Source	Rating
Allmusic	3.5/5 stars
Christgau's Record Guide	B

In a review for Allmusic, the critic Mike DeGagne called "The Ballad of Mad Dogs and Englishmen" the highlight of the album and wrote, "On the whole, Leon Russell and the Shelter People is an entertaining and more importantly, revealing exposition of Russell's music when he was in his prime. ... Carney is an introspective piece which holds up a little better from a songwriting standpoint, but this album does a better job at bearing his proficiency as a well-rounded musician."

== Track listing ==
All tracks composed by Leon Russell except where indicated

Side one

1. "Stranger in a Strange Land" (Russell, Don Preston) – 3:58
2. "Of Thee I Sing" (Russell, Don Preston) – 4:21
3. "A Hard Rain's a-Gonna Fall" (Bob Dylan) – 5:10
4. "Crystal Closet Queen" – 2:57
5. "Home Sweet Oklahoma" – 3:25
6. "Alcatraz" – 3:50

Side two

1. "The Ballad of Mad Dogs and Englishmen" – 3:55
2. "It Takes a Lot to Laugh, It Takes a Train to Cry" (Dylan) – 3:47
3. "She Smiles Like a River" – 2:56
4. "Sweet Emily" – 3:19
5. "Beware of Darkness" (George Harrison) – 4:34

The CD reissue contains the following 3 bonus tracks:

1. "It's All Over Now, Baby Blue" (Dylan) – 3:38
2. "Love Minus Zero/No Limit" (Dylan) – 3:19
3. "She Belongs to Me" (Dylan) – 3:26
- Home Sweet Oklahoma, Alcatraz, Beware Of Darkness - Recorded at Island Studios, London, August 23–26, 1970.
- It's A Hard Rain Gonna Fall, It's All Over Now, Baby Blue, Love Minus Zero/No Limit, She Belongs To Me, Sweet Emily, Crystal Closet Queen - Recorded at Muscle Shoals Studios, Sheffield, Alabama, September 1970.
- The Ballad Of Mad Dogs And Englishmen - Recorded at A&M Studios, Hollywood, December 23, 1970.
- Stranger In A Strange Land, Of Thee I Sing, It Takes A Lot To Laugh, It Takes A Train To Cry, She Smiles Like A River - Recorded at Skyhill/Shelter Studios, Hollywood, January, 1971
- Final mixes by John Fry made at Ardent Studios, Memphis, Tennessee, April 1971

== Charts ==
Chart (1971)	Peak position
Australia (Kent Music Report)	5
United Kingdom (Official Charts Company)	29
United States (Billboard 200)	17

== Personnel ==
- Leon Russell – lead vocals, piano, organ (1, 2, 4, 8, 10), guitar (1, 2, 4–6, 8, 10–11)
- Don Preston – guitar (1–4, 8, 10, 12–14), backing vocals (1, 2, 4, 8, 10)
- Joey Cooper – guitar (1, 2, 4, 8, 10), backing vocals (1, 2, 4, 8, 10)
- Eric Clapton – guitar (5, 6, 11)
- Jesse Ed Davis – guitar (3, 12–14)
- Jimmy Johnson – guitar (9)
- John Gallie – organ (1, 2, 4, 8, 10)
- Chris Stainton – organ (5, 6, 11)
- Barry Beckett – organ (9)
- Carl Radle – bass guitar (1–7, 10–14)
- David Hood – bass guitar (9)
- Chuck Blackwell – drums (1, 2, 4, 8, 10)
- Jim Gordon – drums (5, 6, 11)
- Jim Keltner – drums (3, 12–14)
- Roger Hawkins – drums (9)
- Claudia Lennear – backing vocals (1, 2, 4, 8, 10)
- Kathi McDonald – backing vocals (1, 2, 4, 8, 10)
- Nick DeCaro – string arrangements (7)

Production

- Leon Russell – producer
- Denny Cordell – producer
- Peter Nicholls – engineer (1, 2, 8, 9)
- Marlin Greene – engineer (3, 4, 10, 12–14)
- Andy Johns – engineer (5, 6, 11)
- Glyn Johns – engineer (7)
- John Fry – mixing

== Covers ==
- "Alcatraz" – was covered by Jesse Ed Davis on his 1972 album Ululu
- "Alcatraz" – was covered by Nazareth on their 1973 album Razamanaz
- "Stranger in a Strange Land" – was covered by Jack Grunsky on his 1972 album Jack Grunsky
