= Let's Go Get Stoned =

Single by Ray Charles

from the album Crying Time
- B-side: "The Train"
- Released: 1966
- Genre: R&B
- Length: 2:57
- Label: ABC
- Songwriters: Nickolas Ashford, Valerie Simpson, Josephine Armstead
- Producer: Joe Adams

Ray Charles singles chronology
"Together Again" (1966)	"Let's Go Get Stoned" (1966)	"I Don't Need No Doctor" (1966)

"Let's Go Get Stoned" is a song originally recorded by The Coasters in May 1965. It was written by Nickolas Ashford, Valerie Simpson, and Josephine Armstead. Ronnie Milsap recorded it in October 1965 as a B-side to the single, "Never Had It So Good.

== Ray Charles recording ==
It was a 1966 number one R&B hit for American recording artist Ray Charles. The single was released shortly after Charles was released from rehab after a 16-year heroin addiction. Charles heard a 1965 recording of the song by Ronnie Milsap. According to Milsap, Charles liked his version of the song so much that he decided to record it himself. It is notable for being one of Ashford & Simpson's first successful compositions together; the duo also penned Charles' "I Don't Need No Doctor".

== Chart positions ==
Chart (1966)	Peak position
U.S. Billboard Hot 100	31
U.S. Billboard Hot R&B Singles	1

== Other notable covers ==
- Manfred Mann recorded the song on their number one British EP, No Living Without Loving, which topped the UK EP chart in December 1965.
- James Brown released a recording of the song as a single.
- Big Mama Thornton recorded the song for her 1969 album Stronger Than Dirt.
- Joe Cocker performed the song at Woodstock in August 1969, and it was one of the tracks on his 1970 live double album, Mad Dogs & Englishmen.
