= Jim Price (musician) =

American session musician (1945–2023)

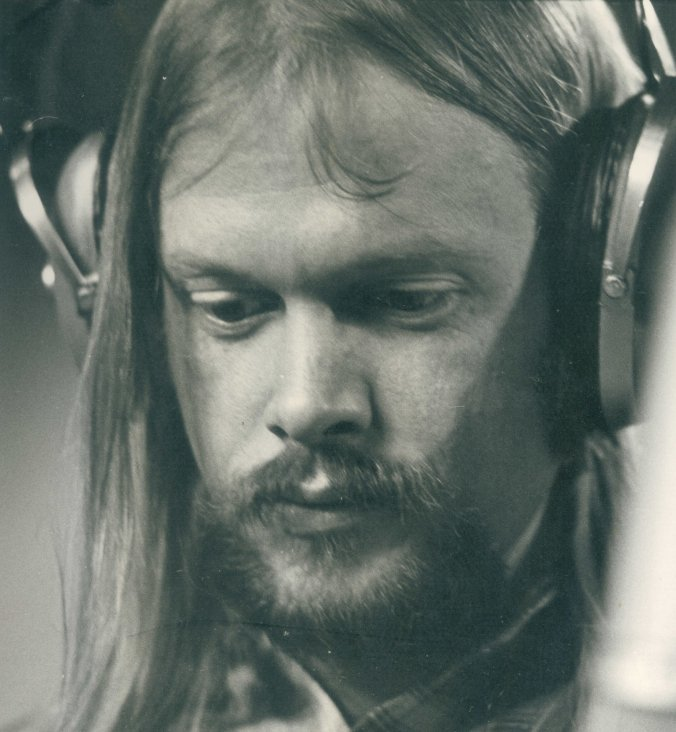

Background information
- Born: July 25, 1945; Fort Worth, Texas, U.S.
- Died: February 6, 2023 (aged 77)
- Genres: Rock
- Occupations: Session musician, composer, audio producer
- Instruments: Trumpet, trombone, piano
- Years active: 1960s–2010s

James William Price (July 25, 1945 – February 6, 2023) was an American session musician. He toured extensively with The Rolling Stones from 1970 until 1973, including their 1972 American Tour, and appears on the albums Sticky Fingers, Exile on Main St. and Goats Head Soup. From September 1968 to February 1969, Price played with New Buffalo Springfield. He also toured and recorded with Delaney & Bonnie and Friends, Joe Cocker's Mad Dogs and Englishmen and Eric Clapton. Price played on several songs on Harry Nilsson's Nilsson Schmilsson. Price produced Cocker's album I Can Stand a Little Rain, which includes the song "You Are So Beautiful" (originally written by Billy Preston but rearranged for Cocker by Price).

== Career ==
Price worked as a session musician, playing trombone and trumpet in the Los Angeles area. His work on the Delaney & Bonnie album Accept No Substitute (1969) led to touring with the band. He next appeared on Eric Clapton's debut solo album, Eric Clapton (1970). Also that year, he worked on All Things Must Pass with George Harrison and Mad Dogs and Englishmen with Joe Cocker. The next year he appeared on Barbra Streisand's album Barbra Joan Streisand. He also worked as a record producer in this period. During the 1980s and 1990s, Price composed music for numerous motion pictures, television programs and advertisements.

== Albums produced by Price ==
- Jim Price - Kids Nowadays Ain't Got No Shame (A&M)
- Genya Ravan - They Love Me, They Love Me Not (ABC/Dunhill)
- Jim Price - Sundego's Traveling Orchestra (ABC/Dunhill, CBS)
- All Occasion Brass Band - In The Presence Of The Lord (MCA)
- Joe Cocker - I Can Stand a Little Rain (A&M) (includes the single "You Are So Beautiful")
- Joe Cocker - Jamaica Say You Will (A&M)
- Wayne Shorter - Native Dancer (CBS), 1975
- Jennifer Warnes - Jennifer Warnes (Arista)
- KGB - KGB (MCA)
- David Bromberg - Reckless Abandon (Fantasy)
- Milton Nascimento - Journey to Dawn (A&M)

== Television and film scores ==
Price orchestrated the underscoring for ABC Children's Weekend Specials (Asselin Productions). He also arranged, conducted, and produced the music score for the SHO Films production City Limits.

Price composed, arranged, conducted, and produced the music score for the MHE production, Heated Vengeance. In addition he was the composer and music director for the ABC two-hour special All-Star Pro Sports Awards. Price also composed, arranged, and produced the music score for the MPCA feature film, Hangfire.

== Discography ==
=== Studio albums ===
- Kids Nowadays Ain't Got No Shame (A&M), 1971
- Sundego's Travelling Orchestra (ABC/Dunhill, CBS), 1972

=== Singles ===
- "Pick A Prize" (ABC/Dunhill, CBS), 1972 from Sundego's Travelling Orchestra
