= Sessions for Robert J =

Studio album / video by Eric Clapton
- Released: 7 December 2004
- Recorded: 14 March – 14 August 2004
- Genre: Blues; blues rock
- Length: 45:38
- Label: Reprise
- Director: Stephen Schible
- Producer: Eric Clapton; Simon Climie

Eric Clapton chronology
Me and Mr. Johnson (2004)	Sessions for Robert J (2004)	Back Home (2005)

Singles from Sessions for Robert J
- 1. "Sweet Home Chicago (Promotional)" Released: 30 November 2004

Sessions for Robert J is the sixteenth solo studio album by the British rock guitarist and singer-songwriter Eric Clapton, released on 7 December 2004 through Reprise Records. The release is a companion project to his previously released album Me and Mr. Johnson, and features Clapton recording alternate versions of the songs from that album along with additional tracks, also written by American blues pioneer Robert Johnson. A DVD shows Clapton and his band travelling around the United Kingdom and United States just before and after his appearance at the 2004 Crossroads Guitar Festival, recording some takes of Johnson's songs on video. Songs that were not included on the first album include: "From Four 'Til Late", "Terraplane Blues", "Ramblin' on My Mind", "Sweet Home Chicago", and "Stones in My Passway". Several songs are performed in duet by Clapton on steel-string acoustic guitar and Doyle Bramhall II on steel string acoustic and dobro guitars. Between sessions, Clapton discusses Johnson's profound influence on him and other musicians. One notable segment features Clapton performing in the 508 Park Avenue building in Dallas, Texas, that served as a makeshift studio in 1937 for Johnson to cut his recordings.

== Background ==
In his 2007 autobiography, Clapton wrote that he asked his long-time friend Hiroshi Fujiwara to direct a video which would accompany some tracks from his then-new studio release Me and Mr. Johnson for either TV or Internet broadcasting, (but not for commercials). Fujiwara agreed to work with Clapton on the project but also suggested that his friend Stephen Schible, the producer of the movie Lost in Translation, work with him and Clapton. When Schible got to the scene, he quickly decided to go beyond the idea of doing some short-form videos that Clapton had suggested and film a whole documentary about why Clapton loved Robert Johnson and how Johnson influenced him, as well as other musicians and the blues in general. When Clapton agreed and finished filming for the video release, he was amazed by the recordings and consented to release them. With Sessions for Robert J, Clapton felt he had paid his dues to Robert Johnson.

== Critical reception ==
Canadian music journalist Darryl Sterdan from Jam! magazine liked both the compact disc and DVD video release, noting that Clapton "picked up where he left off with last spring's Me and Mr. Johnson, covering more classics by Delta blues pioneer Robert Johnson in assorted settings". Sterdan awarded the release four out of five possible stars, especially enjoying the recordings from 508 Park Avenue, where several blues icons had recorded their music more than 60 years ago. AllMusic critic Thom Jurek liked Sessions for Robert J and awarded the release three out of possible five stars. For his review for the AllMusic website, Jurek notes:

It appears that Eric Clapton had more Robert Johnson in his blood than he thought – or perhaps it was planned this way. This DVD/CD set […], showcases Clapton mining the Robert Johnson vein ever more deeply in no less than four different settings. The DVD features 19 acoustic and electric performances recorded in rehearsal spaces in Dallas and in England, as well as in the 508 Park Avenue in Dallas, a studio Johnson himself recorded in, in 1937. There is one more segment, a recorded solo acoustic in a hotel room in California. The band that joins Clapton in the rehearsal studios is composed of guitar master Doyle Bramhall II, organist Billy Preston, Steve Gadd on drums, pianist Chris Stainton and Nathan East on bass. The electric performances, particularly 'Milkcow's Calf Blues', 'Stop Breakin' Down Blues', and especially 'I Wish I Had Possession Over Judgment Day', have some real life and stomp in them. Of the acoustic tracks, 'Terraplane Blues' works best. The DVD also contains a selection of behind-the-scenes footage that will be of interest only to those fans who need to see everything. The CD contains 11 cuts culled from the DVD and the sequencing is in some ways preferable.

— Thom Jurek, AllMusic

== Chart performance ==
Chart (2004–06)	Peak position
Austrian Albums (Ö3 Austria)	74
French Albums (SNEP)	120
Japanese Albums (Oricon)	189
US Billboard 200	172
US Top Blues Albums (Billboard)	1
US Top Music Videos (Billboard)	21

Sessions for Robert J was not very successful on the album charts, possibly due to its predecessor released earlier in Spring of 2004. However, the compact disc album peaked at number 74 on the official Austrian album charts where it stayed for one week on the chart in 2004. In France, the album reached number 120 on the album charts, compiled by the Syndicat National de l'Édition Phonographique and spent a total of six weeks on the chart, reaching even into the next year. In Japan, Sessions for Robert J sold about 6,000 units in its first week on the chart, peaking at number 189. By the end of 2011, however, the release sold 60,000 copies in the Asian country. In Canada, the album did not reach the music charts, but was a medium success, selling about 20,000 copies in the country. In the United Kingdom, the album also did not reach the official albums chart, however, it sold close to 25,000 copies. In the United States, both the album and the video release were most successful, reaching position 172 on the Billboard 200 albums chart, where the album stayed for two weeks. The release also topped the Billboard magazine's Blues albums chart, and spent a total of 49 weeks on the genre chart until 2006. The video DVD release reached number 21 on the American Top Music Video charts, also compiled by Billboard magazine. In the United States alone, the album sold more than 230,000 copies. In total, Sessions for Robert J has sold more than 400,000 copies worldwide. For the year-ending of 2005, Sessions for Robert J was the 3rd best-selling blues album in the United States.

=== Track listings ===
All tracks are written by Robert Johnson.

Compact disc track listing
No.	Title	Length
1.	"Sweet Home Chicago"	5:17
2.	"Milkcow's Calf Blues"	3:49
3.	"Terraplane Blues"	3:36
4.	"If I Had Possession Over Judgement Day"	3:23
5.	"Stop Breakin' Down Blues"	2:56
6.	"Little Queen of Spades"	5:27
7.	"Traveling Riverside Blues"	4:26
8.	"Me and the Devil Blues"	2:50
9.	"From Four Until Late"	3:01
10.	"Kind Hearted Woman Blues"	5:39
11.	"Ramblin' on My Mind"	2:42
Total length:		45:38

DVD track listing
No.	Title	Length
1.	"Kind Hearted Woman Blues" (Session 1 – recorded at 11:04am, on 14 March 2004 at Hook End Manor, Checkendon, England)	5:18
2.	"They're Red Hot" (Session 1 – recorded at 11:04am, on 14 March 2004 at Hook End Manor, Checkendon, England)	3:20
3.	"Hellhound on My Trail" (Session 1 – recorded at 11:04am, on 14 March 2004 at Hook End Manor, Checkendon, England)	4:49
4.	"Sweet Home Chicago" (Session 1 – recorded at 11:04am, on 14 March 2004 at Hook End Manor, Checkendon, England)	5:51
5.	"When You Got a Good Friend" (Session 1 – recorded at 11:04am, on 14 March 2004 at Hook End Manor, Checkendon, England)	5:01
6.	"Milkcow's Calf Blues" (Session 2 – recorded at 10:45am, on 2 June 2004 in Las Colinas, Irving, Texas)	3:42
7.	"If I Had Possession Over Judgement Day" (Session 2 – recorded at 10:45am, on 2 June 2004 in Las Colinas, Irving, Texas)	3:17
8.	"Stop Breakin' Down Blues" (Session 2 – recorded at 10:45am, on 2 June 2004 in Las Colinas, Irving, Texas)	2:52
9.	"Terraplane Blues" (Session 3 – recorded at 8:30pm, on 3 June 2004 in 508 Park Avenue, Dallas, Texas)	3:30
10.	"Hellhound on My Trail" (Session 3 – recorded at 8:30pm, on 3 June 2004 in 508 Park Avenue, Dallas, Texas)	3:20
11.	"Me and the Devil Blues" (Session 3 – recorded at 8:30pm, on 3 June 2004 in 508 Park Avenue, Dallas, Texas)	2:43
12.	"From Four Until Late" (Session 3 – recorded at 8:30pm, on 3 June 2004 in 508 Park Avenue, Dallas, Texas)	3:03
13.	"Love in Vain" (Session 3 – recorded at 8:30pm, on 3 June 2004 in 508 Park Avenue, Dallas, Texas)	3:19
14.	"Ramblin' on My Mind" (Session 4 – recorded at 10:16am, on 14 August 2004 at the Hotel Casa del Mar, Santa Monica, California)	2:46
15.	"Stones in My Passway" (Session 4 – recorded at 10:16am, on 14 August 2004 at the Hotel Casa del Mar, Santa Monica, California)	2:29
16.	"Love in Vain" (Session 4 – recorded at 10:16am, on 14 August 2004 at the Hotel Casa del Mar, Santa Monica, California)	2:53
17.	"Little Queen of Spades" (DVD Bonus)	5:53
18.	"Traveling Riverside Blues" (DVD Bonus)	4:23
19.	"Behind the Scenes Footage" (DVD Bonus)	5:04
20.	"Interviews" (DVD Bonus)	n/a
21.	"Credits" (DVD Bonus)	6:00
Total length:		96:54
