= Claudia Lennear =

American singer (born 1946)

- Also known as: Joy Lennear
- Born: Claudia Joy Offley; 1946 (age 79–80); Providence, Rhode Island, U.S.
- Genres: Soul; rock; pop
- Occupations: Singer; teacher
- Years active: 1968–present
- Label: Real Gone Music
- Website: claudialennear.com

Claudia Lennear (born Claudia Joy Offley; 1946) is an American soul singer and educator. Lennear began her performing with the Superbs before becoming an Ikette in the Ike & Tina Turner Revue. She was also a background vocalist for various acts, including Joe Cocker, Leon Russell, and Freddie King. She released her only solo album in 1973. Lennear was featured in the 2013 Oscar-winning documentary 20 Feet from Stardom. She was inducted in the Rhode Island Music Hall of Fame in 2019.

== Early life ==
Lennear was born Claudia Joy Offley at Providence Lying-In Hospital in Rhode Island. Her last name was changed after her mother married Leo V. Lennear, a Navy man stationed in Newport. She grew up in different neighborhoods in Providence. Although raised a Catholic, her grandmother taught her to sing gospel songs as a child.

In elementary school, Lennear studied music theory and took French at St. Charles Borromeo parochial school. Her career goal was to become a translator at the United Nations. She also took private piano lessons. In high school, she was in the chorale program. As a teenager she listened to Patti LaBelle & the Bluebelles, Gladys Knight & the Pips, Carla Thomas, and Ike & Tina Turner. During her senior year at Hope High School, her stepfather retired from the Navy and she moved to Pomona, California, with her family in 1964.

== Career ==
After graduating from high school, Lennear enrolled in college and began fronting the Los Angeles-based soul group The Superbs. They performed local gigs around Los Angeles. Lennear made her recording debut with the group on the single "One Bad Habit", released on Doré Records in 1968.

=== The Ikettes ===
Through her friend, singer Sherlie Matthews, Lennear landed an audition with bandleader Ike Turner in 1968. She passed the audition and left the Superbs to become an Ikette. She said: "He [Ike Turner] was a terrific business person, very disciplined, and he was a visionary." Lennear was with Ike & Tina Turner for a few years until she had a spat with Tina Turner. Nonetheless, Lennear recalled her time with the Turners fondly, telling The Providence Journal:

Without Ike and Tina, I'd probably be 20 miles from stardom, not 20 feet ... they taught me how to perform, how to work with other singers and musicians. Ike taught me how to support Tina on stage. And Tina taught me how to present myself... . During the three years I was an Ikette, I never witnessed any physical abuse.

=== Post-Ikette career ===
After leaving the Ikettes in 1970, Lennear worked with many acts including Humble Pie and Joe Cocker. She was part of a trio of backup singers for Delaney and Bonnie that also included Rita Coolidge.

Lennear was one of Leon Russell's Shelter People. She sang back-up vocals on Joe Cocker's 1970 Mad Dogs and Englishmen tour and live album, on Leon Russell and the Shelter People (1971), and on George Harrison's The Concert for Bangla Desh (1971). Her lead vocal live recording of "Let It Be" from the film Joe Cocker: Mad Dogs & Englishmen (1971) was the B-side of Leon Russell's "Mad Dogs and Englishmen" single on A&M Records in 1971.

In 1973, Lennear released her first and only solo album for Warner Bros. Records entitled Phew! She had a bit part in the film Thunderbolt and Lightfoot (1974), playing the secretary who asks Clint Eastwood's character for his Social Security number. Lennear appeared in the August 1974 issue of Playboy magazine in a pictorial entitled "Brown Sugar".

Lennear appeared in the Academy Award-winning documentary 20 Feet from Stardom (2013), which premiered at the Sundance Film Festival. After the success of the film, David Bowie contacted Lennear and offered to write songs for her next project.

Since 2014, Lennear has performed and recorded in Los Angeles with The New Ash Grove Players with S S Jones & Claudia Lennear. They have performed at the McCabes Guitar Shop, The Coffee Gallery, the Pasadena Pavilion for the Performing Arts, and The Improv.

At the Lockn' Festival on September 11, 2015, Lennear performed with the Tedeschi Trucks Band, Rita Coolidge, Leon Russell, and other alumni from the 1970 Joe Cocker Mad Dogs and Englishmen Tour in a memorial concert for Cocker.

=== Academic career ===
In 2006, Lennear received degrees in French literature and art history from Pitzer College.

Lennear began teaching first in high school and then at Mt. San Antonio College, where she has been teaching French, Spanish, English, and remedial math.

== Accolades ==
In 2019, Lennear was inducted into the Rhode Island Music Hall of Fame.

== Personal life ==
In 1969, Lennear dated Mick Jagger when Ike & Tina Turner were the opening act for the Rolling Stones on their American tour. Lennear's relationships with Mick Jagger and David Bowie are often cited as inspiration for The Rolling Stones' "Brown Sugar" (1971) and Bowie's "Lady Grinning Soul" (1973). NME editors Roy Carr and Charles Shaar Murray noted in 1981 that she was "yet to reply in song to either Mick or David." However, in a 1973 article in Rolling Stone, she was quoted as saying that she wrote the song "Not At All" "to inform Mick Jagger of his dispensability".

== Discography ==
=== Singles ===
Year	Title	Label
1971	"Let It be"	A&M Records
1973	"Two Trains" / "Not At All"	Warner Bros. Records

=== Albums ===
==== As a solo artist ====
Year	Album	Label
1973	Phew!	Warner Bros. Records

==== As an Ikette ====
Release date	Album	Label
June 1969	In Person	Minit Records
July 1969	So Fine	Pompeii Records
August 1969	Cussin', Cryin' & Carryin' On	Pompeii Records
October 1969	The Hunter	Blue Thumb Records
May 1970	Come Together	Liberty Records
November 1970	Workin' Together	Liberty Records

==== With other artists ====
Year	Album	Artist	Credits
	My Perfect List 60 Titres Soul 1	Various Artists	Primary Artist
1970	Stephen Stills	Stephen Stills	Vocals
1970	Mad Dogs & Englishmen	Joe Cocker	Main Personnel, Vocals, Vocals (Background), Choir/Chorus, Featured Artist, Primary Artist
1970	Alone Together	Dave Mason	Vocals
1971	Rock On	Humble Pie	Vocals
1971	New York City (You're a Woman)	Al Kooper	Vocals, Vocals (Background)
1971	Living by the Days	Don Nix	Vocals, Vocals (Background)
1971	Leon Russell and the Shelter People	Leon Russell	Vocals
1971	Klatu Berrada Nitku	Dependables	Vocals, Bass, Group Member
1971	Into the Purple Valley	Ry Cooder	Vocals
1971	Getting Ready...	Freddie King	Vocals, Vocals (Background)
1971	New York City (You're a Woman)	Al Kooper	Vocals (Background)
1972	Bring Me Back	Tony Kelly	Vocals
1972	A Possible Projection of the Future / Childhood's End	Al Kooper	Vocals
1973	U.F.O.	Ron Davies	Vocals (Background)
1973	Chris Jagger	Chris Jagger	Vocals
1973	Less Than the Song	Hoyt Axton	Main Personnel, Vocals (Background)
1974	No Other	Gene Clark	Main Personnel, Vocals, Vocals (Background)
1974	Mo' Roots	Taj Mahal	Vocals, Vocals (Background)
1974	Compartments	José Feliciano	Vocals (Background)
1975	Stills	Stephen Stills	Vocals
1976	The Best of Leon Russell [DCC/Shelter]	Leon Russell	Vocals
1976	Glass Heart	Allan Rich	Sound Effects
1976	Cry Tough	Nils Lofgren	Vocals, Vocals (Background)
1977	Brothers	Taj Mahal	Vocals, Vocals (Background)
1985	Takin' Care of Business	Freddie King	Choir/Chorus
1991	Key to the Highway [Del Rack]	Freddie King	Vocals, Vocals (Background)
1997	Soft Fun, Tough Tears	Nils Lofgren	Vocals (Background)
1997	Retrospective	Leon Russell	Vocals
1999	Ultimate Collection	Nils Lofgren	Vocals (Background)
1999	Ultimate Collection	Dave Mason	Vocals (Background)
2000	The Best of Freddie King: The Shelter Records Years	Freddie King	Vocals (Background)
2001	Ultimate Collection	Freddie King	Vocals (Background)
2001	Sing a Happy Song: The Warner Bros. Recordings	Taj Mahal	Vocals (Background)
2001	Right On, Vol. 3: Break Beats & Grooves from the Atlantic & Warner Vaults	Various Artists	Primary Artist
2001	Right On! Box Set	Various Artists	Primary Artist
2001	Rare + Well Done: The Greatest & Most Obscure Recordings	Al Kooper	Vocals
2005	The Essential Taj Mahal	Taj Mahal	Main Personnel, Vocals (Background)
2005	Mad Dogs & Englishmen [2005 DVD]	Joe Cocker	Performer
2006	What It is! Funky Soul and Rare Grooves: 1967–1977	Various Artists	Primary Artist
2006	The Definitive Collection	Dave Mason	Vocals (Background)
2006	The Definitive Collection	Humble Pie	Additional Personnel, Vocals (Background)
2006	The Complete Fillmore East Concerts	Joe Cocker	Vocals, Primary Artist
2006	Mad Dogs & Englishmen: Fillmore March 28, 1970	Joe Cocker	Vocals, Primary Artist
2008	All the Funk & Groove	Various Artists	Primary Artist
2010	Rarities Edition: Mad Dogs & Englishmen	Joe Cocker	Choir/Chorus, Primary Artist
2014	The Best of the Superbs	The Superbs	Photo Courtesy
2014	Face the Music	Nils Lofgren	Vocals
2015	Truckers, Kickers, Cowboy Angels: The Blissed-Out Birth of Country Rock, Vol. 6: 1973	Various Artists	Vocals (Background)
2016	Lost Studio Sessions 1964–1982	Gene Clark	Featured Artist
2025	Mad Dogs & Englishmen Revisited (Live at Lockn')	Tedeschi Trucks Band and Leon Russell	Featured artist, recorded live in 2015

== Filmography/TV appearances ==
Year	Title	Role
1968	The Hollywood Palace	Ikette
1969	Andy's Love Concert	Ikette
1969	The Smothers Brothers Comedy Hour	Ikette
1969	Playboy After Dark	Ikette
1970	The Ed Sullivan Show	Ikette
1974	Thunderbolt and Lightfoot	Secretary
2013	20 Feet from Stardom	Herself
