= Pamela Polland =

American singer-songwriter (born 1944)

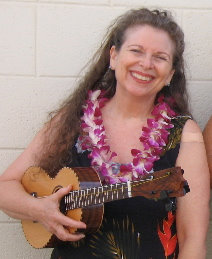
- Polland in 2010

Background information
- Born: Pamela Anna Polland; August 15, 1944 (age 81); California
- Genres: Pop, folk, jazz, blues, music of Hawaii
- Occupations: Singer-songwriter, teacher
- Instruments: Piano, guitar, dulcimer, ukulele
- Years active: 1965–present
- Labels: Epic Records; Columbia Records; Ivory Moon; Currently distributed by AWAL
- Website: pamelapolland.com

Pamela Anna Polland (born August 15, 1944) is an American singer-songwriter who made three albums for Epic and Columbia Records in the 1960s and 1970s and whose songs have been recorded by a number of popular artists. In the 1980s, she re-emerged as an independent recording artist and vocal coach, later working in film and TV scoring and Hawaiian music.

== Life and career ==
=== Early years ===
Polland's father was a woodwind player in the Santa Monica Symphony while her mother was a singer. She composed her first song at the age of nine and by her teens was playing folk clubs. During this period, she formed a two-year alliance with Ry Cooder who accompanied her for performances of blues material. Her recording career began a few years later, in 1966, when she and singer-songwriter Rick Stanley formed the Gentle Soul, a folk band with psychedelic influences and an emphasis on creative and elaborate vocal harmonies. They worked with a number of other musicians, most notably Riley Wildflower and Jackson Browne. Their self-titled album produced by Terry Melcher appeared on Epic Records, together with a number of non-LP singles.

Following the dissolution of the Gentle Soul, Polland set up home in Mill Valley, in Northern California and enlisted Diane Sward Rapaport for management. She joined Joe Cocker and Leon Russell on the Mad Dogs and Englishmen tour in 1970. She can be heard and seen in the ensuing double album and film documentary respectively.

=== Solo artist ===
Her emergence as a solo artist began with the self-titled album Pamela Polland, which appeared on Columbia Records in 1972. Her follow-up album, Have You Heard The One About The Gas Station Attendant? (1973) was recorded in London with producer Gus Dudgeon and featured guest appearances from Joan Armatrading, as well as several members of Elton John's band and his arranger Paul Buckmaster. After the dismissal of her A&R manager Clive Davis from Columbia, the album was shelved.

Her next solo album, Heart of the World, was released in 1995, and produced by Gary Malkin with contributions from Kenny Loggins, Bonnie Raitt, Chris Hillman, as well as Mike Marshall.

Public interest in the Epic/Columbia years was reawakened from 2003 onwards, when The Gentle Soul album was reissued on CD in America. This was followed by several re-issues as well as the unreleased 1973 Columbia album, which appeared in March 2019.

=== Melba Rounds ===
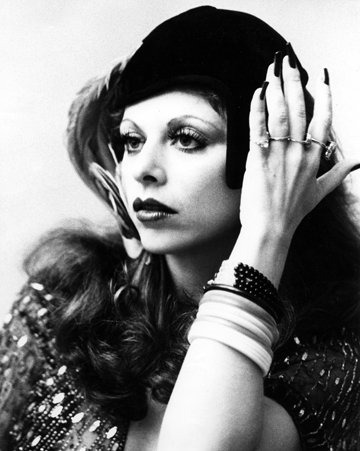
Polland as Melba Rounds

The events at Columbia Records which curtailed Polland's first solo career prompted a change of direction, and in the mid-1970s, she began to perform under the name Melba Rounds. Inspired by the blues and jazz repertoire from the 1920s to the 1940s, she performed around the San Francisco area with a vaudeville act. During the same period she featured as the principal vocalist with The Golden Age jazz band.

=== Hawaii ===
Following the release of Heart of The World, Polland's self-published third solo album, she moved to Maui, Hawaii, and threw herself into local culture and music. She took up the ukulele, studied local language, and became a hula dancer. Polland is currently band leader of Keaolani, a four-piece ‘ukulele band tutored by Hawaiian cultural experts Kahauanu Lake and Walter Kamuala‘i Kawai‘ae‘a. She is also the co-founder of Maui Film Music, through which she provides film and TV scores with Bobby Parrs. Polland's achievements as an artist and performer in Hawaiian music are such that she was requested to appear at Tony Curtis's 81st birthday party as well as a command performance for Anthony Hopkins.

In June 2010, Polland released "Hawaiianized", a five-track digital download EP available internationally via iTunes and other digital outlets. The mini-album, part one of an envisaged series, featured pop classics interpreted in Hawaiian style with new vocal arrangements and 'ukulele accompaniment from Polland. The collection was produced by John McFee of The Doobie Brothers, who had played on Polland's self-titled Columbia debut, and who also played a variety of acoustic and electric stringed instruments on the EP. The set's distinctive background vocals were sung by Sharon Celani, famous for her work with Stevie Nicks and others. "Hawaiianized" was bookended by two different versions of "Somewhere Over The Rainbow", prompting Sam Arlen, son of the song's composer Harold Arlen, to comment, "This version of my father's classic composition lifts the spirit while still tugging at the heartstrings to remind us that there is really no place like home. This disc deserves a home in your collection."

=== Songwriter and teacher ===
Polland's songs have been recorded by a considerable number of popular artists from the 1960s onward. These include Helen Reddy, who recorded "Music, Music" for her gold-selling album of the same name in 1976, and Linda Ronstadt, who recorded "I'd Like To Know". Among the most widely recorded of her songs is "Tulsa County", which has been interpreted by The Byrds, Bobby Bare, Anita Carter, Jesse Ed Davis, and Son Volt. More recently, singer-songwriter Alela Diane recorded Polland's "See My Love" when she guested as a vocalist for The Headless Heroes' 2008 covers album, The Silence of Love. The original version of "See My Love" appeared on The Gentle Soul.

By the 1980s, Polland had also established herself as a vocal coach, and she later released the instructional DVD Vocal Ease.

=== Personal life ===
Polland is married to designer Bill Ernst with whom she has settled in Hawaii on the island of Maui. She was previously married to Greg Copeland.

== Discography ==
=== Albums ===
- Gentle Soul – The Gentle Soul (Epic, BN 26374, 1968)

All tracks written by Pamela Polland/Rick Stanley except where noted.

Tracks

1. "Overture" – 4:35
2. "Marcus" (Pamela Polland) – 2:52
3. "Song For Eolia" – 2:12
4. "Young Man Blue" (Rick Stanley) – 2:30
5. "Renaissance" – 3:10
6. "See My Love (Song For Greg)" (Pamela Polland) – 3:55
7. "Love Is Always Real" – 2:55
8. "Empty Wine" – 2:35
9. "Through a Dream" – 3:54
10. "Reelin'" (Pamela Polland) – 3:17
11. "Dance" (Rick Stanley/N.Wynn) – 3:23

Bonus Tracks

1. "Tell Me Love" (mono, single A-side) (Rick Stanley) – 2:24
2. "Song for Three" (mono, single B-side) (Pamela Polland/G.Copeland) – 2:56
3. "2:10 Train" (mono) (T.Campbell/L.Albertano) – 2:52
4. "Flying Thing" (previously unissued) (Jackson Browne) – 3:15
5. "God Is Love" (previously unissued) – 2:19
6. "You Move Me" (single A-side) (Pamela Polland) – 2:12
7. "Our National Anthem" (single B-side) (Pamela Polland) – 2:28
8. "Tell Me Love" (alternate version, previously unissued) (Rick Stanley) – 2:22
9. "Love Is Always Real" (alternate version, previously unissued) – 3:02

Personnel

- Pamela Polland – female vocals, guitar
- Rick Stanley – vocals, guitar
- Tony Cohan – tabla
- Ry Cooder, Mike Deasy – guitar
- Van Dyke Parks – harpsichord
- Paul Horn – flute
- Ted Michel – cello
- Larry Knechtel – organ
- Bill Plummer – bass
- Gayle Levant – harp

+

- Riley Wyldflower – guitar
- Jerry Cole – guitar
- Joe Osborne – bass
- Sandy Konikoff – drums
- Hal Blaine – drums
- Terry Melcher – producer on Tracks 1 through 11
- Pamela Polland (Columbia, KC 31116, 1972)

Produced by George Daly

- Have You Heard The One About The Gas Station Attendant? (Columbia, 1973)

Unreleased album, completed and mastered, Produced by Gus Dudgeon

- Heart of the World (Ivory Moon, 6795, 1995)

Produced by Gary Malkin

- Hawaiianized (Off The Leash/AWAL, 2010)

Produced by John McFee
