= Matthew Moore (singer) =

American singer songwriter

Matthew Moore was an American singer and songwriter. His biggest commercial success is the song "Space Captain", which was recorded by Joe Cocker (1970) and Barbra Streisand (on Barbra Joan Streisand, 1971).

== Career ==
Moore played in the group The Moon from 1967 to 1969, with whom he recorded two albums. The following year, his brother Daniel managed to put him in touch with session musician Leon Russell. Russell liked his song "Space Captain" and invited Moore to join an upcoming US tour with Cocker, where he sang backing vocals. The tour was recorded and a version of the song was released on the live album Mad Dogs and Englishmen. A different recording of the song was released as the B-side of Cocker's hit single, "The Letter".

Later in the 1970s, Moore played in David Cassidy's band, and collaborated again with Russell.

One of the lines of "Space Captain" was the inspiration for the name Lonely Planet, a mishearing of "lovely planet" by the company's founder, Tony Wheeler.

== Discography ==
- The Moon • Without Earth (1968)
- The Moon • The Moon (1969)
- Mad Dogs and Englishmen (1970)
- Barbra Joan Streisand (1971)
- Winged Horses (1978)
- The Sport of Guessing (1979)
- The Imagine Project (2010)
