= Joe Cocker =

English singer (1944–2014)

Joe Cocker OBE
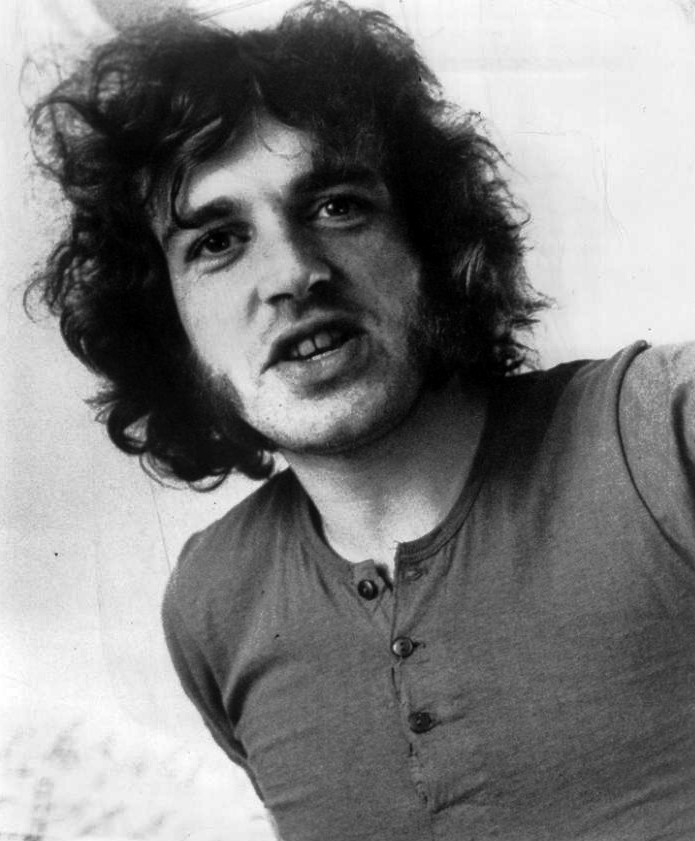
- Cocker in 1969, as pictured on the cover of his second album, Joe Cocker!

Background information
- Also known as: Vance Arnold; the Mad Dog
- Born: John Robert Cocker; 20 May 1944; Sheffield, West Yorkshire, England
- Died: 22 December 2014 (aged 70) Crawford, Colorado, U.S.
- Genres: Rock; blues; blue-eyed soul; pop
- Occupations: Singer; musician
- Instrument: Vocals
- Works: Joe Cocker discography
- Years active: 1961–2014
- Labels: Regal Zonophone; DJM; A&M; Capitol; EMI; Decca; Rocket
- Formerly of: Vance Arnold and the Avengers; The Grease Band
- Spouse: Pam Baker (m. 1987)
- Website: cocker.com

John Robert "Joe" Cocker (20 May 1944 – 22 December 2014) was an English singer known for his gritty, bluesy voice and dynamic stage performances that featured expressive body movements. Most of his best known singles were interpretations of songs written by others, such as "Feelin' Alright" and "Unchain My Heart", though Cocker composed original songs for most of his albums as well, often in conjunction with songwriting partner Chris Stainton.

Cocker's debut album featured a recording of the Beatles' "With a Little Help from My Friends", which was featured as its title track and brought him to near-instant stardom. The song reached number one in the UK in 1968 and became a staple of his many live shows (Woodstock and the Isle of Wight in 1969, the Party at the Palace in 2002) and was also known as the theme song for the late 1980s American TV series The Wonder Years. Cocker continued his success with his second album, which included a second Beatles song, "She Came In Through the Bathroom Window". A hastily thrown-together 1970 US tour led to the live double-album Mad Dogs & Englishmen, which featured an all-star band organised by Leon Russell. His 1974 recording of "You Are So Beautiful" reached number five in the US, and became his signature song. Cocker's best-selling song was the US number one "Up Where We Belong", a duet with American singer-songwriter Jennifer Warnes that earned a 1983 Grammy Award. He released a total of 22 studio albums over a 43-year recording career.

In 1993, Cocker was nominated for the Brit Award for Best British Male Solo Artist. He was awarded a bronze Sheffield Legends plaque in his hometown in 2007, and received an OBE the following year for services to music. Cocker was ranked number 97 on Rolling Stone's 100 greatest singers list. He was posthumously inducted into the Rock and Roll Hall of Fame in November 2025.

== Early life (1944–1960) ==
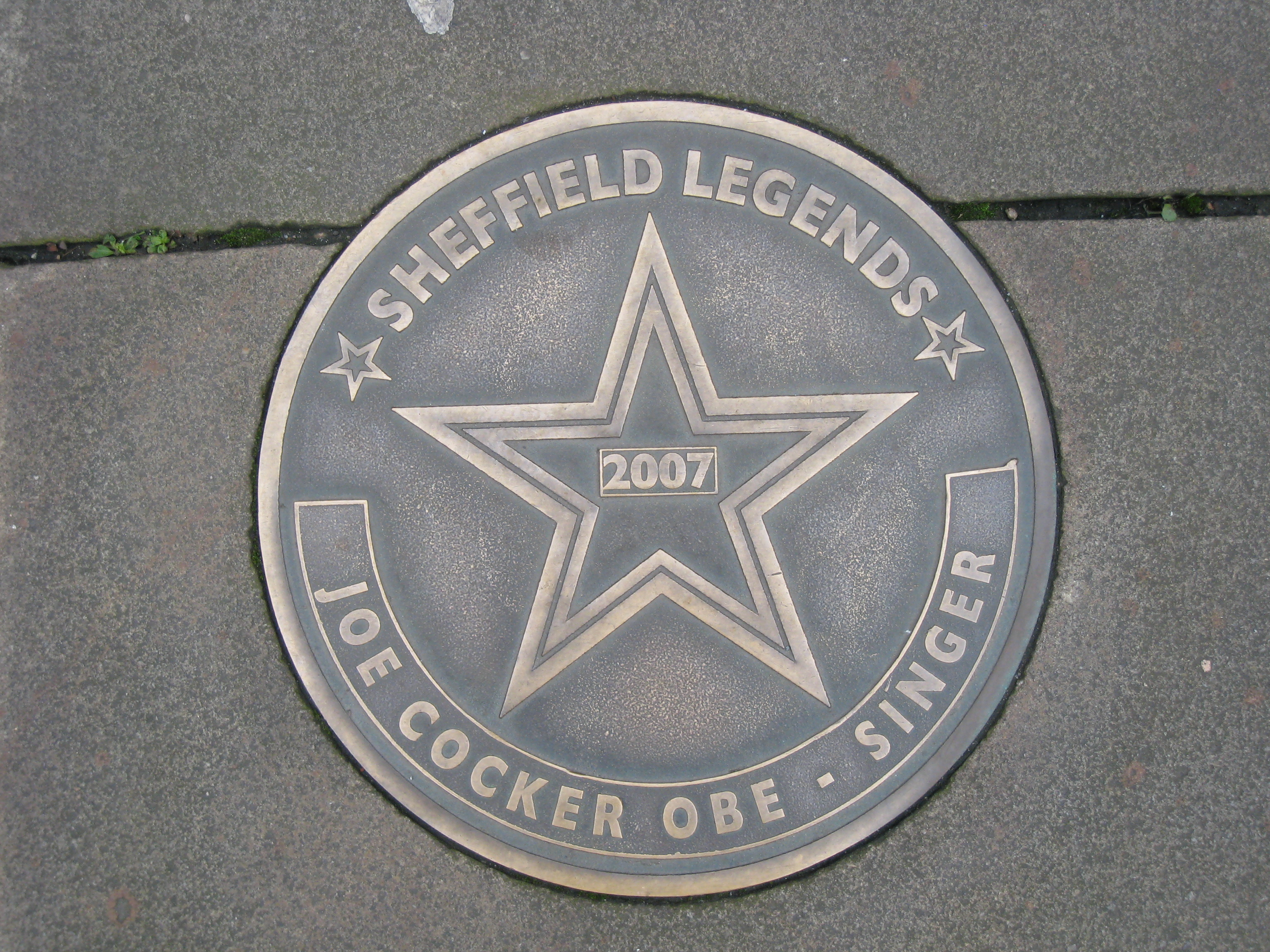
Sheffield Legends plaque in Cocker's home city of Sheffield, England

John Robert Cocker was born on 20 May 1944 at 38 Tasker Road, Crookes, Sheffield. He was the youngest son of a civil servant, Harold Norman Cocker (1907–2001), at the time of his son's birth serving as an aircraftman in the Royal Air Force, and Madge (née Lee). According to differing family stories, Cocker received his nickname of Joe either from playing a childhood game called "Cowboy Joe", or from a local window cleaner named Joe.

Cocker's main musical influences growing up were Ray Charles and Lonnie Donegan. His first experience singing in public was at age 12 when his elder brother Victor invited him on stage to sing during a gig of his skiffle group. In 1960, along with three friends, Cocker formed his first group, the Cavaliers. For the group's first performance at a youth club, they were required to pay the price of admission before entering. The Cavaliers eventually broke up after a year and Cocker left school to become an apprentice gasfitter working for the East Midlands Gas Board, later British Gas Corporation, while simultaneously pursuing a career in music.

Cocker is not related to fellow Sheffield-born musician Jarvis Cocker, despite a rumour circulated by Jarvis' father, Australian radio presenter Mac Cocker, who allowed listeners to believe that he was Joe's brother. However, Joe was a friend of the family and even did some babysitting for Jarvis when the latter was an infant.

== Career (1961–2014) ==
=== Early career and the Grease Band (1961–1969) ===
In 1961, under the stage name "Vance Arnold", Cocker started a new group, Vance Arnold and the Avengers. The name was a combination of Vince Everett (Elvis Presley's character in Jailhouse Rock, which Cocker misheard as Vance) and country singer Eddy Arnold. The group mostly played in the pubs of Sheffield, performing Chuck Berry and Ray Charles songs. Cocker developed an interest in blues music and sought out recordings by John Lee Hooker, Muddy Waters, Lightnin' Hopkins and Howlin' Wolf. In 1963, they booked their first significant gig when they supported the Rolling Stones at Sheffield City Hall.

In 1964, Cocker signed a recording contract as a solo act with Decca and released his debut single, a recording of the Beatles' "I'll Cry Instead" (with Big Jim Sullivan and Jimmy Page playing guitars). Despite extensive promotion from Decca lauding his youth and working-class roots, the record was a flop and his recording contract with Decca lapsed at the end of 1964. After Cocker recorded the single, he dropped his stage name and formed a new group, Joe Cocker's Blues Band. There is only one known recording of Joe Cocker's Blues Band on an EP given out by The Sheffield College during Rag Week and called Rag Goes Mad at the Mojo.

In 1966, after a year-long hiatus from music, Cocker teamed up with Chris Stainton, whom he had met several years before, to form the Grease Band. The Grease Band was named after Cocker read an interview with jazz keyboardist Jimmy Smith, where Smith positively described another musician as "having a lot of grease". Like the Avengers, Cocker's group mostly played in pubs in and around Sheffield. The Grease Band came to the attention of Denny Cordell, the producer of Procol Harum, the Moody Blues and Georgie Fame. Cocker recorded the single "Marjorine" without the Grease Band for Cordell in a London studio. He then moved to London with Chris Stainton, and the Grease Band was dissolved. Cordell set Cocker up with a residency at the Marquee Club in London, and a "new" Grease Band was formed with Stainton and keyboardist Tommy Eyre.

In 1968, Cocker found commercial success with a rearrangement of "With a Little Help from My Friends", another Beatles song. The recording features lead guitar from Jimmy Page, drumming by B. J. Wilson, backing vocals from Sue and Sunny, and Tommy Eyre on organ. The single remained in the top ten of the UK Singles Chart for thirteen weeks before eventually reaching number one, on 9 November 1968. It also reached number 68 on the US charts.

The new touring line-up of Cocker's Grease Band featured Henry McCullough on lead guitar, who would go on to briefly play with McCartney's Wings. After touring the UK with the Who in autumn 1968 and Gene Pitney and Marmalade in early winter 1969, the Grease Band embarked on their first tour of the US that spring. Cocker's album With a Little Help from My Friends was released soon after their arrival and made number 35 on the American charts, eventually going gold.

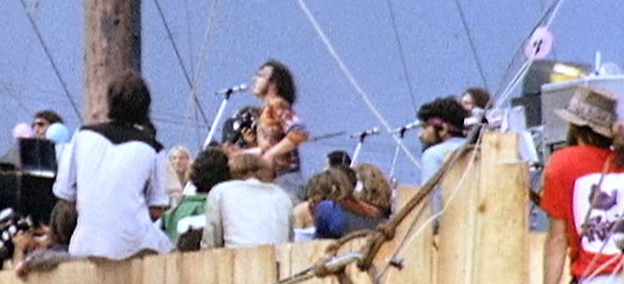
Cocker performing at Woodstock in 1969

During his US tour, Cocker played at several large festivals, including the Newport Pop Festival and the Denver Pop Festival. In August, Denny Cordell heard about the planned concert in Woodstock, New York and convinced organiser Artie Kornfeld to book Cocker and the Grease Band for the Woodstock Festival. The group had to be flown into the festival by helicopter due to the large crowds. They performed several songs, including "Feelin' Alright?", "Something's Comin' On", "Let's Go Get Stoned", "I Shall Be Released" and "With a Little Help from My Friends". Cocker would later say that the experience was "like an eclipse ... it was a very special day."

Directly after Woodstock, Cocker released his second album, Joe Cocker! Impressed by his version of "With a Little Help from My Friends", Paul McCartney and George Harrison allowed Cocker to use their songs "She Came In Through the Bathroom Window" and "Something" for the album. Recorded during a break in touring in the spring and summer, the album reached number 11 on the US charts and garnered a second UK hit with the Leon Russell song, "Delta Lady".

In August 1969, Cocker performed at the Isle of Wight Festival at Wootton Bridge, Isle of Wight, England. Throughout the year, he was featured on variety TV shows like The Ed Sullivan Show and This Is Tom Jones. Onstage, Cocker exhibited an idiosyncratic physical intensity, flailing his arms and playing air guitar. At the end of the year, Cocker was unwilling to embark on another US tour, so he dissolved the Grease Band.

=== Mad Dogs and Englishmen (1970–1971) ===
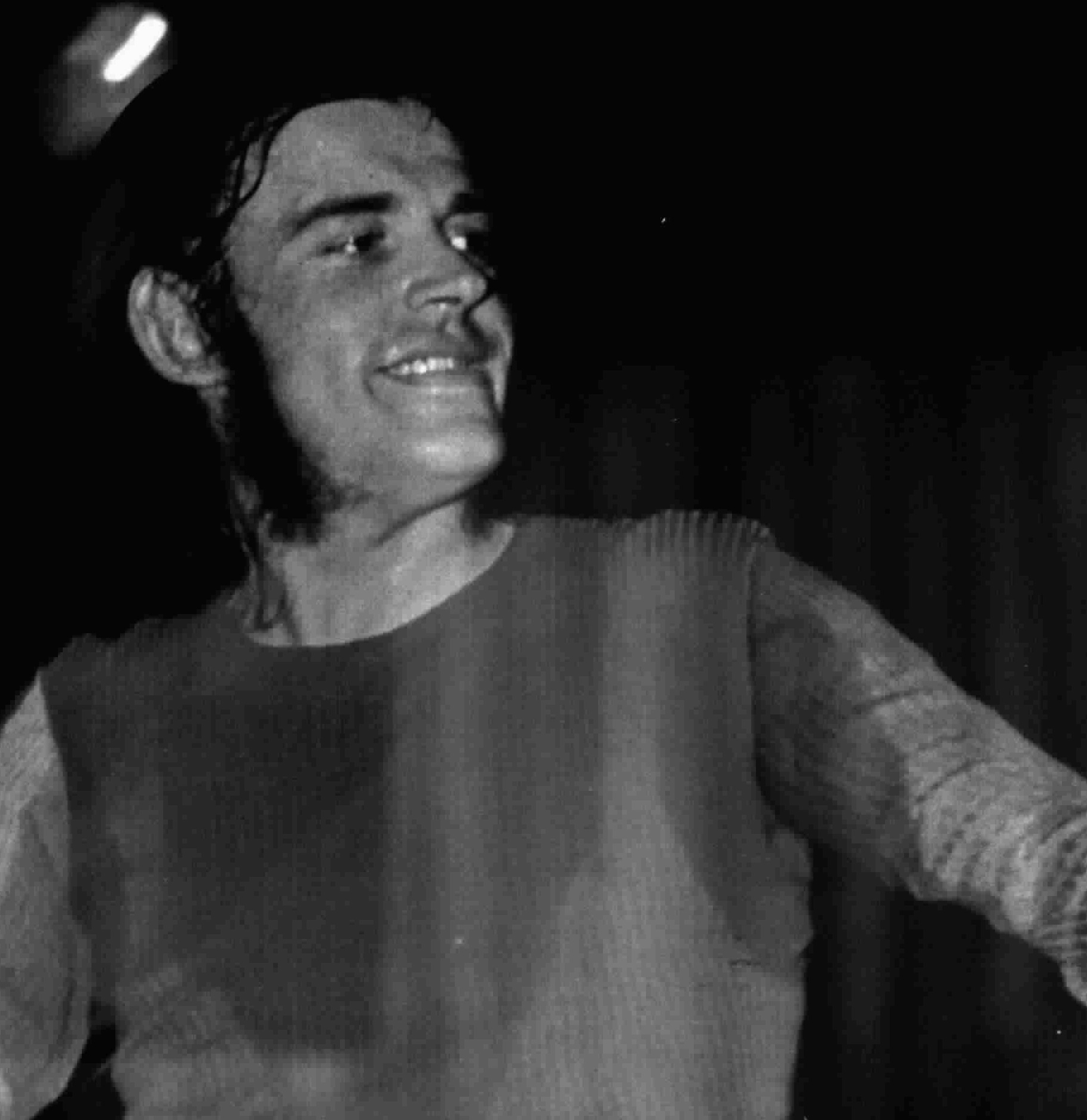
Cocker in concert at Palasport, Rome, July 1972

Despite Cocker's reluctance to venture out on the road again, an American tour had already been booked so he had to quickly form a new band to fulfill his contractual obligations. It proved to be a large group of more than 20 musicians, including pianist and bandleader Leon Russell, three drummers – Jim Gordon, Jim Keltner, and Chuck Blackwell, and backing vocalists Rita Coolidge and Claudia Lennear. Denny Cordell christened the new band "Mad Dogs & Englishmen", after the Noël Coward song of the same name (with its refrain, "Mad dogs and Englishmen go out in the midday sun"). Cocker's music evolved into a more bluesy type of rock, comparable to that of the Rolling Stones.

During the ensuing Mad Dogs & Englishmen tour (later described by drummer Jim Keltner as "a big, wild party"), Cocker toured 48 cities, recorded a live album, and received positive reviews from Time and Life for his performances. However, the pace of the tour was exhausting. Russell and Cocker had personal problems; Cocker became depressed and began drinking excessively as the tour wound down in May 1970. Meanwhile, he enjoyed several chart entries in the United States with cover versions of "Feelin' Alright" (originally recorded by Traffic) and "Cry Me a River".

Cocker's version of the Box Tops' hit "The Letter", which appeared on the live album and film, Mad Dogs & Englishmen, became his first US Top Ten hit. After spending several months in Los Angeles, Cocker returned home to Sheffield, where his family became increasingly concerned with his deteriorating physical and mental health. During the summer of 1971, A&M Records released the single "High Time We Went". This became a hit, reaching number 22 on the US Billboard Hot 100 chart, but was not issued on an album until November 1972 on Cocker's self-titled album.

=== On the road (1972–1979) ===
In early 1972, after nearly two years away from music, Cocker went on tour with a group that Chris Stainton had formed. He opened with a performance in Madison Square Garden, which was attended by about 20,000 people. After touring the United States, Cocker embarked on a European tour, where he played to large audiences in Milan and Germany. Cocker then returned to the United States for another tour in autumn 1972. During these tours, the group cut the songs that would be part of his newest album, a self-titled release. A mixture of live songs and studio recordings, the album peaked at number 30 on the US charts.

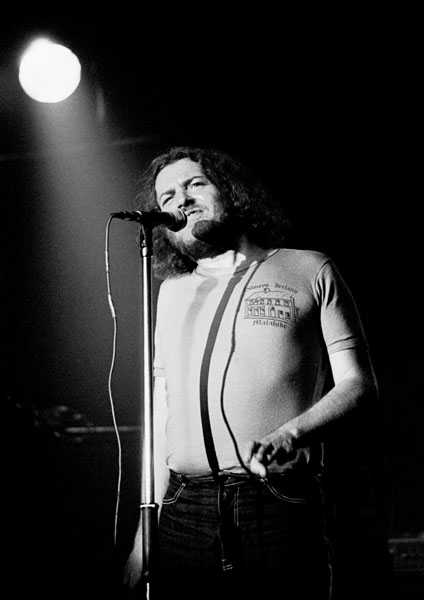
Cocker performing on 16 October 1980 at the National Stadium, Dublin

In October 1972, when Cocker toured Australia, he and six members of his entourage were arrested in Adelaide for possession of marijuana. The next day, in Melbourne, assault charges were laid after a brawl at the Commodore Chateau Hotel, and the Australian Federal Police gave Cocker 48 hours to leave the country. This caused huge public outcry in Australia, as he was a high-profile overseas artist and had a strong support base, especially among the baby boomers who were coming of age and able to vote for the first time. It sparked hefty debate about the use and legalisation of marijuana in Australia, and gained Cocker the nickname "the Mad Dog".

Shortly after the Australian tour, Stainton retired from his music career to establish his own recording studio. After his friend's departure and his estrangement from his longtime producer Denny Cordell, Cocker sank into depression and began using heroin. In June 1973, he kicked the habit but continued to drink heavily.

At the end of 1973, Cocker returned to the studio to record a new album, I Can Stand a Little Rain. The album, released in August 1974, was number 11 on the US charts and one single, a recording of Billy Preston's "You Are So Beautiful", reached the number five slot. Despite positive reviews for the album, Cocker struggled with live performances, largely due to his problems with alcohol. One such instance was reported in a 1974 issue of Rolling Stone, which said that during two West Coast performances in October of that year he threw up onstage.

In January 1975, Cocker released a second album that had been recorded at the same time as I Can Stand a Little Rain, Jamaica Say You Will. To promote his new album, Cocker embarked on another tour of Australia, made possible by the country's new Labor government. In late 1975, he contributed vocals on a number of the tracks on Bo Diddley's The 20th Anniversary of Rock 'n' Roll all-star album. Cocker also recorded a new album in a Kingston, Jamaica studio, Stingray. However, record sales were disappointing; the album reached only number 70 on the US charts.

In May 1976, Cocker headlined an 11-day tour of Canada, and on 2 October, Cocker performed "Feelin' Alright" on Saturday Night Live. John Belushi joined him onstage doing his famous impersonation of Cocker's stage movements. At the time, Cocker was $800,000 in debt to A&M Records and struggling with alcoholism. Several months later, he met producer Michael Lang, who agreed to manage Cocker on the condition that he stay sober. With a new band, Cocker embarked on a tour of New Zealand, Australia and South America. He then recorded a new album with session work by Steve Gadd and Chuck Rainey. In the autumn of 1978, Cocker toured North America promoting his album, Luxury You Can Afford. Despite this effort, it received mixed reviews, selling around 300,000 copies.

In 1979, Cocker joined the "Woodstock in Europe" tour, which featured musicians like Arlo Guthrie and Richie Havens, who had played at the 1969 Woodstock Festival. He also performed in New York's Central Park to an audience of 20,000 people. The concert was recorded and released as the live album, Live in New York.

=== 1980s (1980–1989) ===
In 1982, Cocker recorded two songs with the jazz group the Crusaders on their album Standing Tall. One song, "I'm So Glad I'm Standing Here Today", was nominated for a Grammy Award and Cocker performed it with the Crusaders at the awards ceremony. The Crusaders wrote this song with Cocker in mind to sing it. He then released a new reggae-influenced album, Sheffield Steel, recorded with the Compass Point All Stars, produced by Chris Blackwell and Alex Sadkin.

Also in 1982, Cocker recorded the duet "Up Where We Belong" with the American singer Jennifer Warnes for the soundtrack of the film An Officer and a Gentleman. The song was an international hit, reaching number 1 on the Billboard Hot 100, and winning a Grammy Award for Best Pop Performance by a Duo. The duet also won an Academy Award for Best Original Song, and Cocker and Warnes performed the song at the awards ceremony. Several days later, he was invited to perform "You Are So Beautiful" with Ray Charles in a television tribute to the musician. In 1983, Cocker joined a star-studded line-up of British musicians, including Jimmy Page, Eric Clapton, Jeff Beck, Steve Winwood, and Bill Wyman for singer Ronnie Lane's 1983 tour to raise money for the London-based organisation Action for Research into Multiple Sclerosis, in particular because Lane was beginning to suffer from the degenerative disease.

While on another tour that year, Cocker was arrested by Austrian police after refusing to perform because of inadequate sound equipment. The charges were eventually dropped and Cocker was released. Shortly after the incident, he released his ninth studio album, Civilized Man. Cocker's next album, Cocker, was dedicated to his mother, Madge, who died when he was recording in the studio with producer Terry Manning. A track from the album, a cover of Randy Newman's "You Can Leave Your Hat On", was featured in the 1986 film 9½ Weeks. The album eventually went Platinum on the European charts. Cocker's song "Love Lives On" was featured in the 1987 film Harry and the Hendersons. His 1987 album Unchain My Heart was nominated for a Grammy Award, although it did not win. One Night of Sin was also a commercial success, surpassing Unchain My Heart in sales and yielding his final Top 20 hit in the United States, "When The Night Comes", written by Bryan Adams, Jim Vallance and Diane Warren that peaked at number 11 in January 1990.

In 1984, Cocker released the song "Edge of a Dream", which was included on the soundtrack of the film Teachers. In Brazil, the song became popular as part of the soundtrack of the soap opera Corpo a Corpo, broadcast on Rede Globo in 1985.

Throughout the 1980s, Cocker continued to tour around the world, playing to large audiences in Europe, Australia and the United States. In 1986, he met the Italian singer Zucchero Fornaciari, who dedicated a song (Nuovo, meraviglioso amico, in Rispetto) to the English bluesman. After that, Cocker took part in some concerts of the promotional tours for the albums Blue's (1987) and Oro Incenso & Birra (1989). In 1988, he performed at London's Royal Albert Hall and appeared on The Tonight Show Starring Johnny Carson. After Barclay James Harvest and Bob Dylan, Cocker was the first to give rock concerts in the German Democratic Republic, in East Berlin and Dresden. The venue, the Blüherwiese, next to the Rudolf–Harbig–Stadion, bears the vernacular name Cockerwiese ('Cocker meadow') today. He also performed for US President George H. W. Bush at an inauguration concert in 1989.

=== Later career (1990–2014) ===
In 1992, Cocker's version of Bryan Adams' "Feels Like Forever" made the UK Top 40. That same year, Cocker teamed with Canadian rocker Sass Jordan to sing "Trust in Me", which was featured on The Bodyguard soundtrack. At the 1993 Brit Awards, Cocker was nominated for British Male Solo Artist. He performed the Saturday opening set at Woodstock '94 as one of the few alumni who played at the original Woodstock Festival in 1969 and was well received.

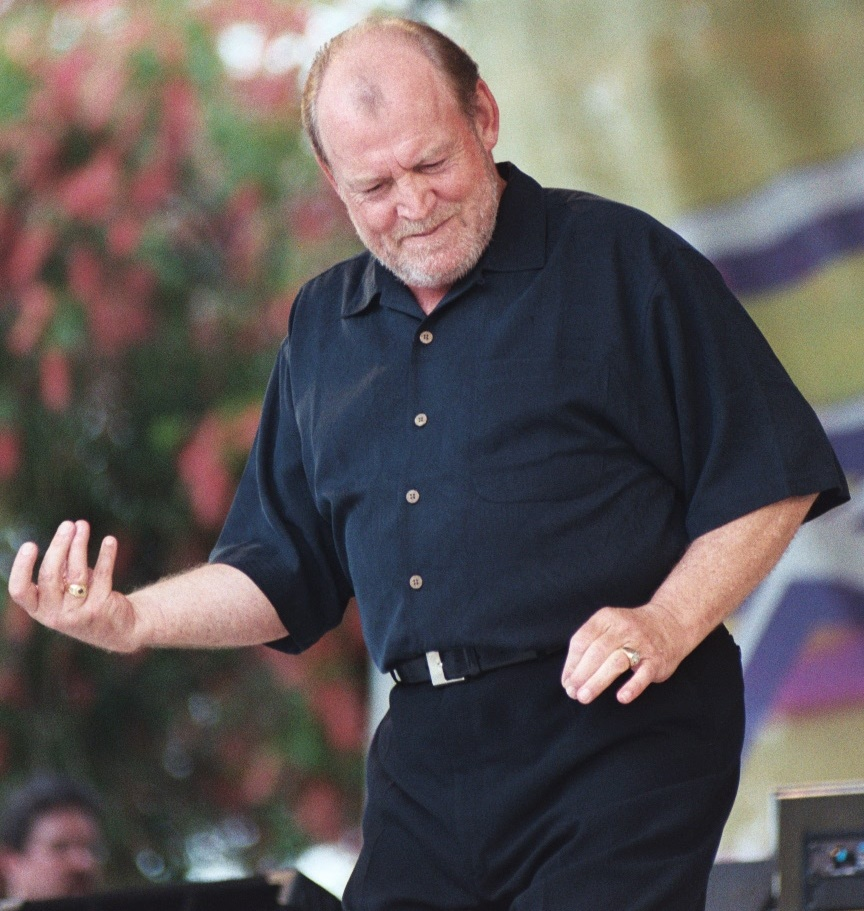
Cocker playing air guitar in Hallandale Beach, Florida, in 2003

On 3 June 2002, Cocker performed "With A Little Help From My Friends" accompanied by Phil Collins on drums and Queen guitarist Brian May at the Party at the Palace concert in the grounds of Buckingham Palace, an event in commemoration of the Golden Jubilee of Elizabeth II. In 2007, Cocker appeared playing minor characters in the film Across the Universe, as the lead singer on another Beatles' hit, "Come Together". He was awarded an OBE in the Queen's 2007 Birthday Honours list for services to music. To celebrate receiving his award in mid December 2007, Cocker played two concerts in London and in his hometown of Sheffield, where he was awarded a bronze Sheffield Legends plaque outside Sheffield Town Hall.

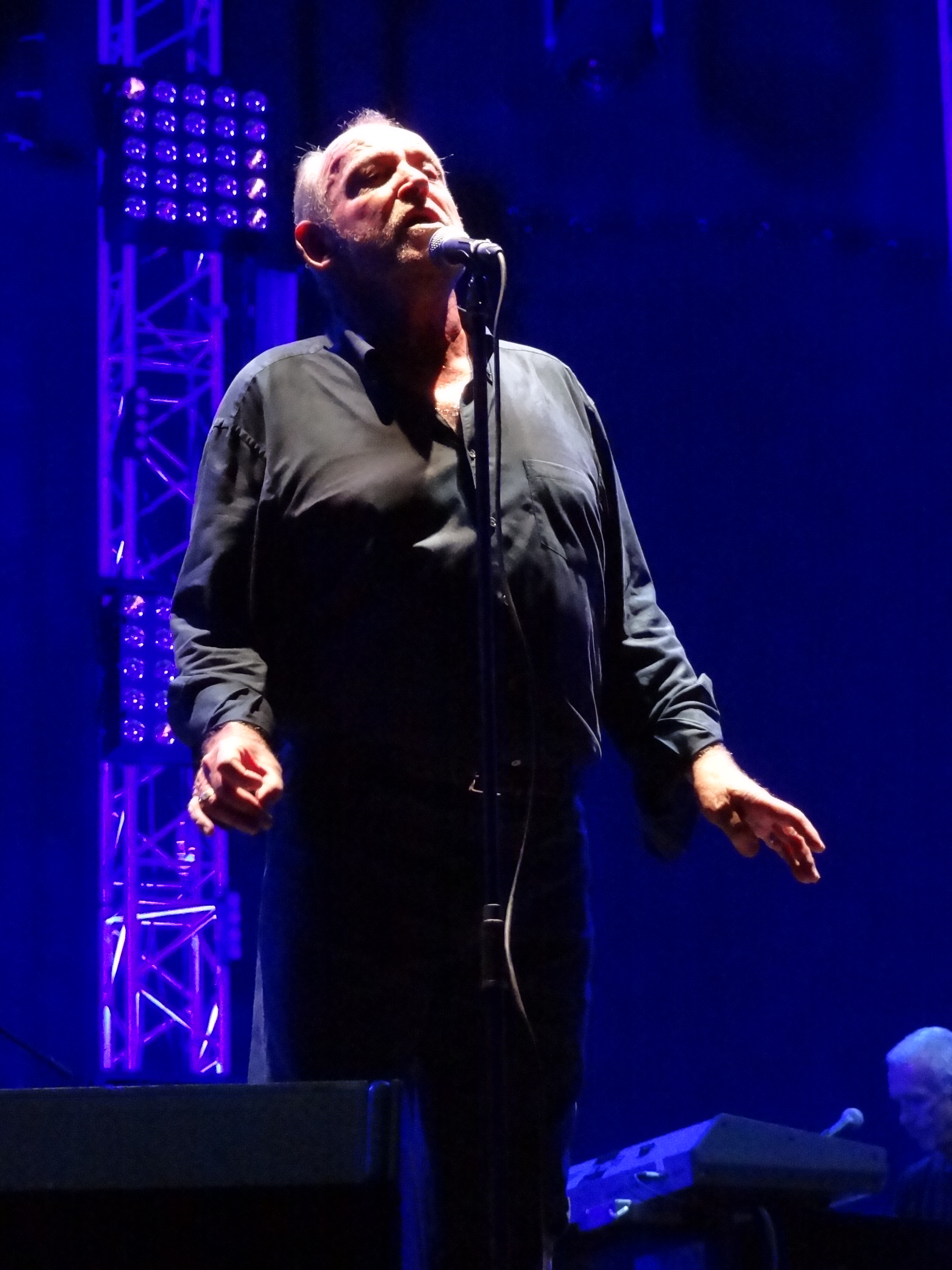
Cocker performing in 2011

In April and May 2009, Cocker conducted a North American tour in support of his album Hymn for My Soul. He sang the vocals on "Little Wing" for the Carlos Santana album, Guitar Heaven: The Greatest Guitar Classics of All Time, released on 21 September 2010. In the autumn of 2010, Cocker toured Europe promoting his studio album Hard Knocks.

In 2000, Cocker was the opening act in select cities in the United States and Europe for Tina Turner's Twenty Four Seven Tour. He returned to Australia in 2008 and again in 2011, the latter of which featured George Thorogood and the Destroyers as an opening act.

On 20 March 2011, Cocker took part in a benefit concert for Cornell Dupree at B.B. King's Blues Club in New York City. Dupree played on four Cocker albums: I Can Stand A Little Rain (1974), Jamaica Say You Will (1975), Stingray (1976) and Luxury You Can Afford (1978). Dupree's band Stuff was also Cocker's backing band on a tour promoting Stingray in 1976.

Cocker kept recording and touring throughout his later years. 2012's Fire it up, which would turn out to be Cocker's last studio album, was followed by an extensive tour, consisting of a US leg in 2012 and a European run in 2013. He played 25 shows in Germany alone on the European leg of the tour, which reflects the popularity Cocker enjoyed there. The full show of 22 April at Cologne's Lanxess Arena was recorded and released on CD and DVD under the title Fire it up Live later in 2013. The last concert on the tour, which was to be Cocker's final live performance, was at the Loreley Open Air Theatre in Sankt Goarshausen on 7 September 2013.

=== Tributes and acclaim ===
In 1994, fellow Yorkshire musician Philip Oakey, on behalf of his group, the Human League, said that Cocker was their "hero".

The two remaining living ex-Beatles, Paul McCartney and Ringo Starr, were among those who paid tribute to the singer following his death, while Cocker's agent, Barrie Marshall, said that Cocker was "without doubt the greatest rock/soul singer ever to come out of Britain". McCartney commented:

He was a lovely northern lad who I loved a lot and, like many people, I loved his singing. I was especially pleased when he decided to cover 'With a Little Help from My Friends' and I remember him and (producer) Denny Cordell coming round to the studio in Savile Row (central London) and playing me what they'd recorded and it was just mind-blowing, totally turned the song into a soul anthem and I was forever grateful to him for doing that.

On 11 September 2015, a "Mad Dogs & Englishmen" tribute concert to Joe Cocker was performed at the Lockn' Festival featuring Tedeschi Trucks Band, Chris Stainton, Leon Russell, Rita Coolidge, Claudia Lennear, Pamela Polland, Doyle Bramhall II, Dave Mason, John Bell, Warren Haynes and Chris Robinson, among others. In commemoration, a Joe Cocker Mad Dogs and Englishmen Memory Book was created by Linda Wolf to celebrate the event. In late 2021, the feature-length documentary Learning to Live Together was released documenting the reunion concert.

In 2017, a feature-length documentary film about Cocker titled Joe Cocker: Mad Dog with Soul was released.

==== Accolades ====
- 1983: 25th Annual Grammy Award, Best Pop Performance by a Duo or Group with Vocal, with Jennifer Warnes for "Up Where We Belong"
- 1988 Nominee: Grammy Award for Best Solo Rock Vocal Performance
- 1989, 1990, 1991 Nominees: Grammy Award for Best Male Rock Vocal Performance
- 1993 Nominee: Brit Award for Best British Male Solo Artist
- 1994 Honorary Doctorate: Sheffield Hallam University
- 1996, 2013: Goldene Kamera
- 1998, 1999, 2013, 2014 Nominees: Echo
- 2007: Order of the British Empire (OBE)
- 2025: Rock and Roll Hall of Fame inductee.

Publication	Country	Accolade	Year	Rank
Mojo	United Kingdom	"Top 100 Singers Of All Time"	1999	58
Rolling Stone	United States	"100 Greatest Singers of All Time"	2008	97
Billboard	United States	Artist 100	2015	84
Billboard	United States	Social 50	2015	14

== Personal life and death ==
In 1963, Cocker began dating Eileen Webster, also a resident of Sheffield. They dated intermittently for the next 13 years.

In 1978, Cocker moved onto a ranch owned by Jane Fonda in Santa Barbara, California. Pam Baker, a local summer camp director and fan of Cocker's music, had persuaded the actress to lend the house to Cocker. Baker began dating Cocker, and they got married on 11 October 1987.

While performing a concert at Madison Square Garden on 17 September 2014, fellow pop musician Billy Joel stated that Cocker was "not very well right now" and endorsed Cocker for induction into the Rock and Roll Hall of Fame before his tribute performance of "With a Little Help from My Friends".

Cocker died from lung cancer on 22 December 2014 in Crawford, Colorado, at age 70. He smoked two packs of cigarettes a day until he quit in 1991.

In November 2025, Cocker was inducted into the Rock and Roll Hall of Fame by Bryan Adams.

== Discography ==
=== Studio albums ===
- With a Little Help from My Friends (1969)
- Joe Cocker! (1969)
- Joe Cocker (1972)
- I Can Stand a Little Rain (1974)
- Jamaica Say You Will (1975)
- Stingray (1976)
- Luxury You Can Afford (1978)
- Sheffield Steel (1982)
- Civilized Man (1984)
- Cocker (1986)
- Unchain My Heart (1987)
- One Night of Sin (1989)
- Night Calls (1991)
- Have a Little Faith (1994)
- Organic (1996)
- Across from Midnight (1997)
- No Ordinary World (1999)
- Respect Yourself (2002)
- Heart & Soul (2004)
- Hymn for My Soul (2007)
- Hard Knocks (2010)
- Fire It Up (2012)

== General sources ==
- Bean, Julian P. (2003). Joe Cocker: The Authorised Biography. London: Virgin Books. ISBN 1-85227-043-8.
- Logan, Nick; Woffinden, Bob (1975). The New Musical Express Book of Rock. Star Books. ISBN 0-352-30074-4.
