= Mr. Moonlight (song) =

1962 song by Roy Lee Johnson

Single by Dr. Feelgood and the Interns
- A-side: "Doctor Feel-Good"
- Released: 1962
- Genre: Blues
- Length: 2:16
- Label: Okeh (US); Columbia (UK)
- Songwriter: Roy Lee Johnson

"Mr. Moonlight" is a song written by Roy Lee Johnson and recorded by Dr. Feelgood and the Interns in 1962. The song was covered by the Beatles on their 1964 albums Beatles for Sale (in the U.K.) and Beatles '65 (in the U.S.).

== Dr. Feelgood and the Interns ==
The Atlanta group Dr. Feelgood and the Interns first recorded the song. Willie Perryman, an albino black blues pianist, led the group as Piano Red or Dr. Feelgood. (Note: Dr. Feelgood is slang for heroin and doctors that write out easy prescriptions, though it is unclear whether Perryman was aware of this implication.) Roy Lee Johnson, the Interns' guitarist and the song's composer, sang "Mr. Moonlight". It was released as the B-side of "Dr. Feelgood", a minor hit in the US for Okeh Records, achieving 66 in Billboard and 74 in Cashbox. The track, issued on EMI's Columbia, did not chart in Britain.

== The Beatles' version ==
"Mr. Moonlight"
- Cover of the song's sheet music

Song by the Beatles

from the album Beatles for Sale
- Released: December 4, 1964 (UK); December 15, 1964 (US)
- Recorded: August 14 and October 18, 1964
- Studio: EMI, London
- Genre: Folk rock
- Length: 2:38; 2:41 (US stereo version)
- Label: Parlophone (UK); Capitol (US)
- Songwriter: Roy Lee Johnson
- Producer: George Martin

The Beatles covered the recording for their 1964 albums Beatles for Sale (UK) and Beatles '65 (US). The recording features Latin-style percussion, prominent vocal harmonies, and, unusually, an organ solo. John Lennon sings lead, with backing vocals from Paul McCartney and George Harrison.

=== Background ===
The Beatles covered the song in their live act for years before it appeared on record, adding it to their repertoire in mid-1962. (Note: Walter Everett writes it was added to their repertoire in late 1961 or early 1962. Mark Lewisohn writes that the Beatles discovered the record in mid-1962. A set-list from August 1962 includes the track; neither "Mr. Moonlight" nor any of the other songs in that list are included in earlier sets, such as shows from spring 1961 and February 1, 1962. The A-side it was backing ("Doctor Feel-Good") first appeared in the Billboard Hot 100 in April 1962.) They discovered the track on the B-side of "Dr. Feelgood" by Dr. Feelgood and the Interns. (Note: The Beatles never played "Dr. Feelgood", but their contemporaries Rory Storm and the Hurricanes did.) Neil Aspinall recalled, "Mr. Moonlight was great because there would be this moment of tension in the audience. The song would be announced and everybody knew John would have to start on that note—MISTER! Moonlight. There was no chord to precede it, he had to get it right from nothing." The track was often their opening number, which Beatles historian Mark Lewisohn writes, "commanded their crowd's attention before playing so much as a second."

=== Recording ===
The Beatles first recorded the song on Friday, August 14, 1964, during a session which included "I'm a Loser" and "Leave My Kitten Alone". Four takes were recorded with take four marked "best." This version of the song did not yet include Hammond organ and percussion instruments, with Lennon and Harrison's guitar work instead more prominent. On Sunday, October 18, during a day off from their 1964 UK Tour, the Beatles attempted a re-make of the track starting with take five. On take seven they added a distinct Hammond organ played by McCartney. Take eight was deemed best.

Recorded on a four-track recorder, track one features Ringo Starr's percussion (Note: Walter Everett writes that Starr's percussion is a conga. Ian MacDonald surmises, "Starr's alleged bongos suggest instead the slapped packing-case which Derek Taylor's sleeve-note ascribes to his part in the similarly excruciating 'Words of Love'.") and McCartney's bass; track two includes overdubs of Harrison on an African drum and McCartney on Hammond organ; track three is Lennon on vocal with McCartney and Harrison providing harmony; track four includes a Gretsch Country Gentleman guitar overdub. Producer George Martin and engineers Norman Smith and Ken Scott mixed the track for mono from takes four and eight on October 27. Martin, Smith and Mike Stone mixed the track for stereo on November 4.

=== Release ===
The Beatles released the track in the U.K. on Beatles for Sale on December 4, 1964, and in the U.S. on Beatles '65 on December 15, 1964. In the U.S. the track made it to #68 nationally.

A cover of the song is heard in a recording of the Beatles from December 1962 at the Star-Club in Hamburg, eventually released in 1977 as Live! at the Star-Club in Hamburg, Germany; 1962.

Takes 1, 2 and 4 are heard on Anthology 1 and in The Beatles Anthology television documentary.

=== Critical reception ===
In The Beatles as Musicians, musicologist Walter Everett describes the track as, "One of the Beatles' least popular tracks". Mark Lewisohn writes it is "most people's least favourite song on what was to become the Beatles for Sale LP." Lewisohn adds that in hindsight "Leave My Kitten Alone" may have made a better album track. Comparing the two, Everett writes, "The two covers attempted on August 14 represent one of Lennon's most inspired borrowings and one of his least. Unfortunately, the former, 'Leave My Kitten Alone,' was never released during the group's tenure..."

Everett writes the a cappella opening is "promising" with Lennon's "dirty full-voice... but the tone quickly becomes inexpressively lugubrious." Musicologist and writer Ian MacDonald describes the track as "gross quasi-calypso". He compliments Lennon's "berserk delivery" which "blasts away much of the song's gaudy chintz, only for this to be reinstated in all its gold lamé ghastliness by McCartney's Hammond organ solo." He considers that the song may have been recorded as a joke, a possibility Tim Riley agrees with, writing, "By taking the whole thing so seriously, they actually make it hysterical".

=== Personnel ===
According to Ian MacDonald, except where noted:

- John Lennon – vocal, rhythm guitar
- Paul McCartney – harmony vocals, bass, Hammond organ
- George Harrison – harmony vocals, lead guitar, African drum
- Ringo Starr – conga

== Other covers ==
Another emerging beat group, The Hollies, recorded and released their own performance of the song prior to the Beatles' version, with Graham Nash on lead vocals. The song was also covered by the Merseybeats in 1963.

A Spanish cover was recorded by the Mexican vocal trio Los Apson Boys titled "Triste Luna".

== Sources ==
- Everett, Walter (2001). The Beatles As Musicians: The Quarry Men through Rubber Soul. Oxford and New York: Oxford University Press. ISBN 978-0-19-514105-4.
- Lewisohn, Mark (1988). The Complete Beatles Recording Sessions. New York: Harmony. ISBN 978-0-517-57066-1.
- Lewisohn, Mark (2013a). The Beatles – All These Years, Volume One: Tune In. Crown Archetype. ISBN 978-1-4000-8305-3.
- Lewisohn, Mark (2013b). The Beatles – All These Years, Volume One: Tune In (Extended Special ed.). Crown Archetype. ISBN 978-1-4087-0478-3.
- MacDonald, Ian (2005). Revolution in the Head: The Beatles' Records and the Sixties (2nd revised ed.). London: Pimlico. ISBN 978-1-84413-828-9.
- Riley, Tim (2002). Tell Me Why: The "Beatles" – Album by Album, Song by Song, the Sixties and After. Da Capo Press. ISBN 978-0306811203.
