= Polythene Pam =

1969 song by the Beatles

- Northern Songs sheet music cover

Song by the Beatles

from the album Abbey Road
- Released: 26 September 1969 (UK)
- Recorded: 25, 28, and 30 July 1969
- Studio: EMI, London
- Genre: Rock and roll; Rock
- Length: 1:12
- Label: Apple
- Songwriters: John Lennon, credited to Lennon–McCartney
- Producer: George Martin

Abbey Road medley chronology
"Mean Mr. Mustard"	"Polythene Pam"	"She Came In Through the Bathroom Window"

Official audio
- "Polythene Pam" on YouTube

"Polythene Pam" is a song by the English rock band the Beatles from their 1969 album Abbey Road, the fourth piece in the album's climactic medley. It is a brief, brisk character sketch of a woman from the North who, dressed in a bag made of polythene, roams the streets at night and earns coverage in the tabloid paper News of the World. John Lennon wrote it during the group's 1968 sojourn in India. While a third source has been proposed, Lennon shaped the character of Polythene Pam from two women he knew personally. The first is "Polythene" Pat Dawson, an early Beatles fan so named for her appetite for the plastic; the second is Royston Ellis's girlfriend Stephanie, who spent a night in bed with Ellis and Lennon clad in a polythene bag.

The song was to be recorded for the Beatles' 1968 White Album but instead made Abbey Road, a contribution of Lennon's to the medley (also dubbed the Long One) that he viewed with frigidness. In fact, he later called the song, along with another of his medley pieces, "only finished bits of crap I wrote in India". The band recorded "Pam" on three separate days in July 1969 as a continuous piece with "She Came In Through the Bathroom Window", which comes after in the Long One.

Critics have spotlighted "Pam"'s driving rhythm and Lennon's singing in an aggressive Scouse accent. It is one of the Long One's several character sketches and builds narrative unity by linking to the previous track "Mean Mr. Mustard", a portrait of an old miser whose sister is Polythene Pam. As for its musical role in the medley, "Pam" intactly leads to the resolution back to A major in the beginning of "Bathroom Window", returning to the key in which the medley's first piece is written. (Note: "Bathroom Window" is also in the key of A minor.) Most critics reviewing Abbey Road or the Beatles catalogue have said little about the song.

== Background ==
=== The song ===
John Lennon wrote "Polythene Pam" in Rishikesh, (Note: While Lennon wrote "Polythene Pam", it is credited to Lennon–McCartney.) a pilgrimage town for Hindus. The Beatles had travelled there in February 1968 to stay at the Maharashi Mahesh Yogi's monastery and practise Transcendental Meditation. The few weeks they spent in Rishikesh fostered their largest output of songs to date, including most of the tracks that formed The Beatles (popularly dubbed the White Album).

However, "Pam" hardly concerned the Beatles' time in India. It in fact draws from two or three women in Lennon's life, two of whom are far more often discussed across scholarly books and biographies. (Note: One or both of the two common cases, "Polythene" Pat Hodgett and Royston Ellis' girlfriend, are mentioned in Courrier 2009 (pp. 252–253), Davies 2016 (p. 229), Guesdon & Margotin 2013 (p. 590), Hamelman 2009 (p. 136), Harry 2000b (p. 724), MacDonald 2005 (p. 364), Miles 1997 (p. 557), Womack 2014b (p. 738), among others, while the third case, the "bag lady" in Hyde Park, is briefly covered in Womack 2019 (p. 143).) The first is "Polythene" Pat Dawson (born Hodgett); as a fourteen-year-old girl from Liverpool, she was a Beatles fan and frequently attended their shows at the local Cavern Club. She would eat polythene—in her recollection, by winding it into in knots, sometimes after burning it and letting it cool. Her friend worked at a polythene factory and assured her a steady supply of the plastic. She once related: "... I got quite friendly with [the Beatles]. If they were playing out of town they'd give me a lift back home in their van. It was about the same time that I started getting called Polythene Pat." In his John Lennon Encyclopedia, the journalist Bill Harry introduces Dawson as a "Liverpool barmaid who had a brief flirtation with John".

The second source is Royston Ellis's girlfriend Stephanie. Ellis was an English Beat poet who would tour the country to read his verse alongside a jazz and pop or rock and roll performance. Having been invited to the University of Liverpool in 1960, he met and befriended the Beatles and even accompanied them during one of their gigs that year. Three years later, he chanced to meet them again. Ellis had since quit the Beat culture and found work as a ferry engineer in Guernsey. It is there that the Beatles performed on 8 August, at Candie Gardens, after which Ellis encountered Lennon and invited him to pass the night at his and Stephanie's flat. (Note: Barry Miles, in his diary on the Beatles, records Lennon and Ellis's encounter under 6 August 1963, two days before the group's show at Candie Gardens. However, his biography of Paul McCartney, consistently with other sources, does mark 8 August as the date of their meeting. Yet, it says that the group performed at the Guernsey Auditorium, not at Candie Gardens.) According to the Beatles scholar Kenneth Womack, Ellis had rented a garret especially for the event. Then, with Stephanie wearing a polythene bag, the three stayed the night together in bed. Their memories drift apart as to what exactly happened.

Perverted sex in a polythene bag. Just looking for something to write about.

— Lennon in a 1980 interview

Lennon told David Sheff in their 1980 interview:

That was me, remembering a little event with a woman in Jersey [sic], and a man who was England's answer to Allen Ginsberg ... I met him when we were on tour and he took me back to his apartment and I had a girl and he had one he wanted me to meet. He said she dressed up in polythene, which she did. ... Perverted sex in a polythene bag.

About the character of Polythene Pam's wearing jackboots and kilts, he added: "She didn't wear jack boots and kilts, I just sort of elaborated." Lennon did not imply that Stephanie was the woman dressed in polythene, and neither does Bill Harry. From his end, Ellis did not remember any "perverted sex" but faintly remembered Stephanie; he recalled his own picture in 1994:

We'd read all these things about leather and we didn't have any leather, but I had my oilskins and we had some polythene bags from somewhere. We all dressed up in them and wore them in bed. John stayed the night with us in the same bed. I don't think anything very exciting happened and we all wondered what the fun was in being 'kinky.'

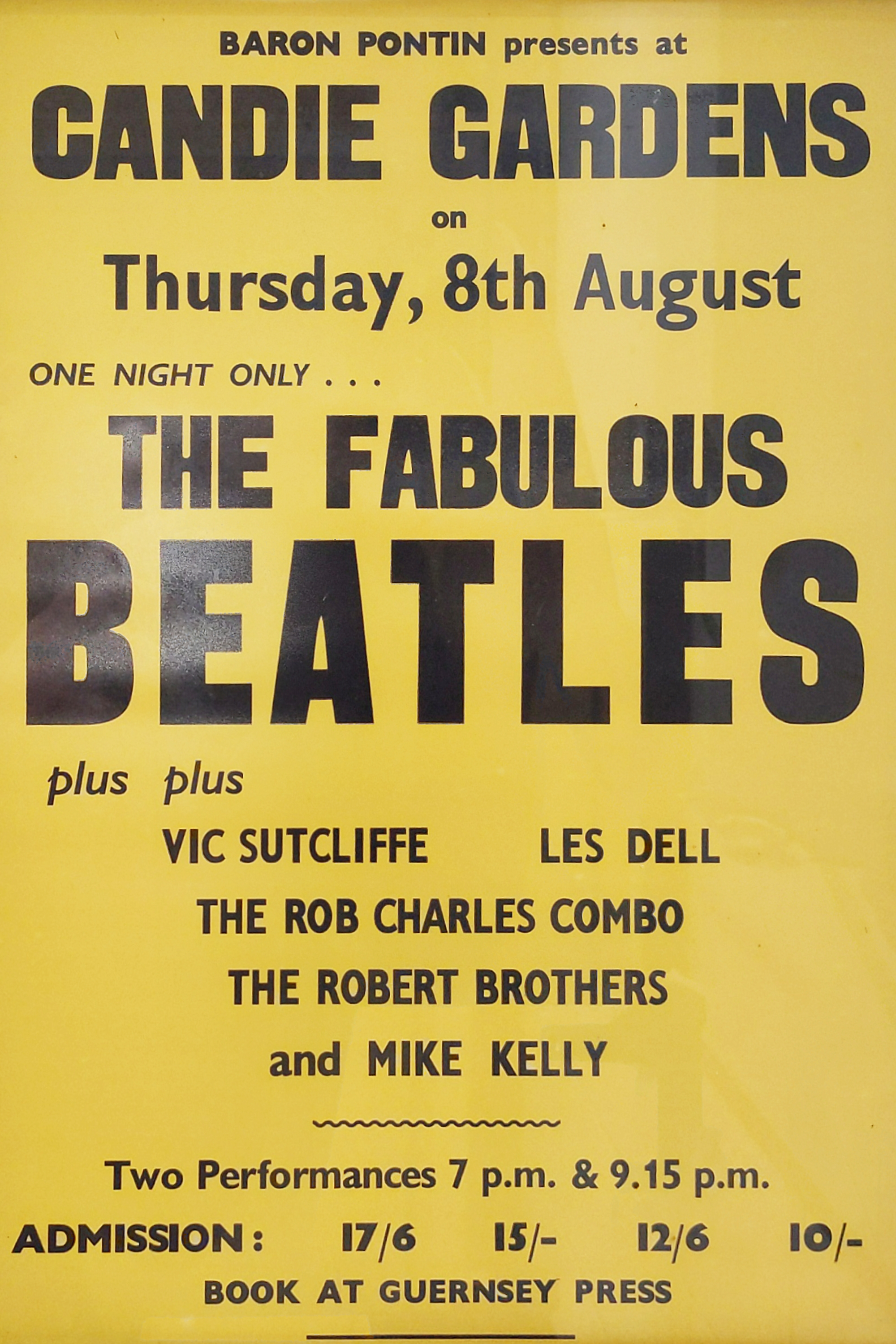
The Beatles performed at Candie Gardens, Guernsey, on 8 August 1963. Lennon's chance encounter after the concert would stoke in him a muse for the character of Polythene Pam.

He says that the night's events stemmed from a verse in his poetry booklet: "I long to have sex between black leather sheets, and ride shivering motorcycles between your thighs." Paul McCartney presented his account of the night as Lennon had relayed it: "John, being Royston's friend, went out to dinner with him and got pissed and stuff and they ended up back at his apartment with a girl who dressed herself in polythene for John's amusement, so it was a little kinky scene." (Note: He also conjures up the Beatles' reaction to Lennon's retelling the events of that night: "He came back with all these tales about a girl who dressed in polythene: 'Shit! There was this chick and it was great...' and we thought, 'Oh, wow!'") Moreover, he recalled that Ellis had encountered Lennon in the first place by attending their gig, although he said they met not in Guernsey but "down South ... somewhere like Shrewsbury", and that the pair then had dinner together before retreating to Ellis's flat. His biographer Barry Miles indicates that McCartney too had met Ellis in Guernsey. Since "Pam" for the most part sketches a character's being dressed in polythene, Lennon's night with Stephanie and Ellis is the main source for the song.

The third source, confidently named by the Beatles associate Tony Bramwell, was "an old 'bag lady' who used to hang around the Knightsbridge end of Hyde Park, close to the army barracks". As he explained, she would sleep in the park and keep her belongings in plastic bags, and Lennon was struck by her. In addition, the musicologist Walter Everett suggests that Pam's polythene bag dress refers to Lennon and Yoko Ono's Bag Productions company; Lennon explicitly mentions the firm in "Come Together". The music author Kevin Courrier likewise sees a hint of their performance art bagism, but only in Stephanie's act of being in bed while inside a polythene bag.

=== The Abbey Road medley ===
I think Paul has conceptions of albums, or attempts it, like he conceived the medley thing. I'm not interested in conceptions of albums. All I'm interested in is the sound. I like it to be whatever happens. I'm not interested in making the album into a show. For me, I'd just put 14 rock songs on.

— Lennon, as reported in The Beatles Anthology

When working on Abbey Road in 1969, the Beatles did not know that their time as a band was fast moving towards divorce. (Note: Traditional works of Beatles scholarship state otherwise, but their account has since fallen out of favour. For example, Ian MacDonald writes in Revolution in the Head (2005) that the group, conscious of their fate, gave their assent for the medley mostly to close their career together with a majestic ending, a celebration.) (Note: Still, some people close to the Beatles had their suspicions. The sound engineeer Alan Parsons, who worked on Abbey Road, wrote in the foreword to Solid State (2019): "I also knew that, realistically speaking, Abbey Road would be the last time the Beatles would be the Beatles." George Martin too sensed an unmistakable end to their partnership, and Ethan Russell gathered from the photoshoots for the album cover that "they were not a happy group". While he did not know for sure, George Harrison said that "it felt as if we were reaching the end of the line".) Lennon originally wanted a rock and roll album, and McCartney, a pop symphony/opera, so the album was split two ways: the first side contained individual songs, and most of the second half was a sixteen-minute medley (then dubbed the Long One).

The idea for the medley was McCartney's, and the group's producer George Martin claimed his share of credit in wanting "to get John and Paul to think more seriously about their music". He had long been advising the group to "think symphonically", to use motifs and complex structures and forms. The concept of extended operatic songwriting was fashionable at the time; the Mothers of Invention had tried it with Absolutely Free (1967), and Keith West did so in "Excerpt from a Teenage Opera" (1967), the latter particularly intriguing McCartney. His bandmates George Harrison and Ringo Starr also showed interest in the medley. A lot of concise but complete songs had piled up in Lennon and McCartney's backlog, and they thought of releasing them by stitching them together into one piece. Thus, the medley's tracks, short "half" songs, are connected in some way by thematic or tonal coherence and link together through segues and fades. The music scholar Alan W. Pollack parses it into four movements, as in a symphony, and sorts "Mean Mr. Mustard", "Pam", and "She Came In Through the Bathroom Window" into the third. Through the first two tracks, the medley builds up a flow that rises and reaches climax at the opening of "Bathroom Window"; the final climax is contained in the fourth movement.

With time, Lennon grew less eager about the Long One, both because it was McCartney's idea and because he preferred plain rock and roll without intricate album structures and other ornamentations. Such was his preference that when the band's assistant Neil Aspinall suggested Sgt. Pepper's Lonely Hearts Club Band include a reprise of the title song, Lennon told him: "No one likes a smart-arse, Neil." He thought very little of his three contributions to the medley, "Sun King", "Mustard", and "Pam", and said they were "juggled ... about until it made vague sense". Nevertheless, Lennon expressed open enthusiasm about forging the medley in June. He would, as Martin recalls, approach the others with "an idea for sewing a bit of music into the tapestry. Everybody worked frightfully well ...". Then, a car accident left him bedridden. While recovering, the rest of the band worked on other medley tracks, and Womack suggests he came to dislike the project because of his diminished involvement. Some critics hold that the three Lennon numbers are the medley's weakest patch. (Note: Ingham adds McCartney's "She Came In Through the Bathroom Window", following "Pam", to this sequence of "diverting filler".) In spite of this, Ingham, one of these critics, thinks their peculiar characters make them "hugely entertaining", and Mark Hertsgaard, another, praises "Pam"'s "wicked humor". Rolling Stone agrees: "He contributed some of its most eccentric parts, like the sneering 'Mean Mr. Mustard' and the quick, funky put-down 'Polythene Pam.'"

The author Nicholas Schaffner writes that a world of whimsical characters populates Abbey Road, such as "Mean Mr. Mustard with the 10-shilling note up his nose, who gets his kicks out of screaming obscenities at Her Majesty; and his transvestite sister Pam, resplendent in a polythene bag". (Note: Lennon based Mr. Mustard on a miser he had read about in the papers who would hide his money inventively to avoid spending it.) To Womack, these characters reflect the band's attraction to balladry. In "Mustard", the title character has a sister called Pam. Her name, going as far back as the song's demo in 1968, was originally Shirley, but Lennon changed it to Pam "to make it sound like it had something to do with it" and hence make the medley sound continuous. Lennon wanted to record his medley songs at one go without interruption; as Womack states: "In so doing, they would not only serve the purposes of the musical suite but also share in the unfolding character studies that the medley was beginning to accrue."

== Recording and sequencing on Abbey Road ==
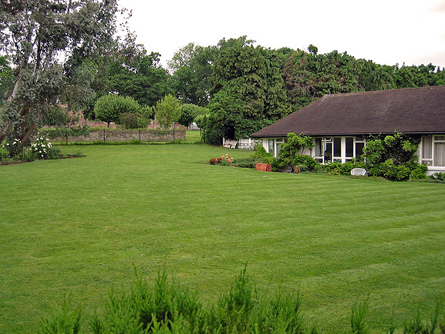
Lennon recorded a demo at George Harrison's Kinfauns estate in Esher, South East England.

"Pam" was first intended to be recorded for the White Album. Lennon performed an acoustic demo at Harrison's Kinfauns home in May 1968 much resembling the final released version, save for the name change from Shirley to Pam and an altered verse: instead of "She's the kind of a girl that makes the News of the World", he sings "It's a little absurd but she's a nice class of bird". The demo is also somewhat longer but, Rolling Stone's Jordan Runtagh argues, still too meagre to become a song in its own right, as Lennon utters the two verses over and over; towards the demo's end, he says "It's too long, that!". Lennon recorded another at his Kenwood estate. On 24 January 1969, he played "Pam" during the Get Back sessions for the only time. Pollack hesitates to call this performance of the song a performance and, rather, prefers sketch: "John and Paul in particular seem to be having a dickens of a time keeping their signals straight with respect to either words or chord changes."

"Pam" was recorded together with the song succeeding it in the medley, "She Came In Through the Bathroom Window", as one track, like "Sun King" and "Mean Mr. Mustard". This happened across three days, on 25, 28, and 30 July 1969, in thirty-nine takes. The Beatles recorded the basic track for "Pam"/"Bathroom Window" at EMI Studio Two in London on 25 July; Starr plays his Ludwig Hollywood Maple drum kit, Harrison, his Gibson Les Paul Standard electric guitar, McCartney, his Rickenbacker 4001S bass, and Lennon plays his Framus Hootenanny twelve-string guitar. (Note: Everett indicates that Harrison played the descending notes towards the end of the recording on a Fender Telecaster.) They passed the session's last few hours overdubbing drums, bass, and lead vocals onto the final take.

Lennon sang an off-mike guide vocal on "Pam", while McCartney did the same on "Bathroom Window". As Harrison plays his guitar solo, Lennon shouts words of encouragement ("Fab! That's great! Real good, that. Real good ..."), some of which appear on the finished recording. A cry of "Yeah, great!" sets the solo running. Courrier notes that "each band member calls out to the other in a spirit of generosity as if feeling the indelible pull of what brought the Beatles together before they were so torn apart". At the very beginning of "Bathroom Window", in anticipation of the change of tempo, Lennon talks to the Beatles' road manager Mal Evans off-mike, gives out a laugh, and then yells "Oh, look out!". (Note: According to the scholar Tim Riley, McCartney gave the "Oh, look out!" cry.) Lennon thought that Starr could not find an adequate drum part for the recording; the sound engineer Geoff Emerick writes about a sour comment Lennon made comparing Starr's drumming to Dave Clark's. Pestered, he eventually said: "Sod it, let's just put one down anyway", and even after Starr earnestly devised a new part with McCartney and prepared to play it on a new backing track, Lennon told him: "I'm not playing this bloody song again, Ring. If you want to redo the drums, go ahead and overdub them." And Starr did overdub them with Emerick's help.

Take 27 of "Polythene Pam"
- Polythene Pam (Take 27) on YouTube

The band carried out overdubs on the track on 28 July: maracas, tambourine, cowbell, and other instrumental parts were scattered across by all four members. (Note: The attribution of these percussion parts to the band's usual drummer Starr is tenuous, since some writers do not credit them to him and others suggest that his bandmates played them. Bill Harry, for instance, writes that Lennon was on maracas, McCartney on cowbells, and Harrison on tambourine, and Womack notes in his biography of Abbey Road: "The overdubs were rife with additional percussion too, with everyone chipping in with a range of instruments, including maracas, tambourine, and cowbell." (emphasis added)) That day, writes Womack, Lennon contributed more acoustic guitar and electric piano to the recording, shortly before purging them. According to the Beatles chronicler John C. Winn, many of the overdubs were in fact cut. Recording ended on 30 July, when the final vocal, guitar, and percussion overdubs were taped; these included Harrison's second lead guitar part comprising the descending notes into the start of "Bathroom Window". During the next few hours, George Martin and his fellow producers began stitching, through edits and crossfades, all the medley pieces together into a congruent whole and mixing them for stereo; this was only a trial to spotlight flaws and imperfections. After listening to the transitions between them, the group accepted that of "Pam"/"Bathroom Window". On August 14, mixing was finished, and seven days later, the medley was mastered and finally assembled. "Pam" and "Bathroom Window" fused into the Long One "without the slightest hint of a pause between the [former and 'Mustard', the song preceding it in the medley]", as Womack notes. The move from "Pam" to "Bathroom Window" is likewise fluid. Martin produced "Pam", and Emerick and Phil McDonald, along with John Kurlander and Alan Parsons, engineered it.

For a time, the medley was intended to run with "Her Majesty" flanked between "Mustard" and "Pam". However, while the Abbey Road tracks were being remixed, on 30 July, McCartney considered "Her Majesty" unfit for the Long One and told the sound engineer John Kurlander to scrap it. (Note: According to Kenneth Womack, the "acoustic simplicity" of "Her Majesty" did not suit the medley's vigour, especially when placed amid "Mustard" and "Pam".) Since Kurlander was under orders not to throw out any Beatles recording, he inserted it at the end of Abbey Road after "The End". His edit was only rough. Due to this change in sequencing, "Pam" opens with "Her Majesty"'s final chord and the end of "Mustard" is covered by the opening chords of "Pam", though the transition between them remains rather plane since "Pam" opens with a D major chord common to "Mustard". These errors were never fixed; when Kurlander tried doing so on 30 July, McCartney told him: "Never mind, it's only a rough mix, it doesn't matter."

== Composition ==
=== Style ===
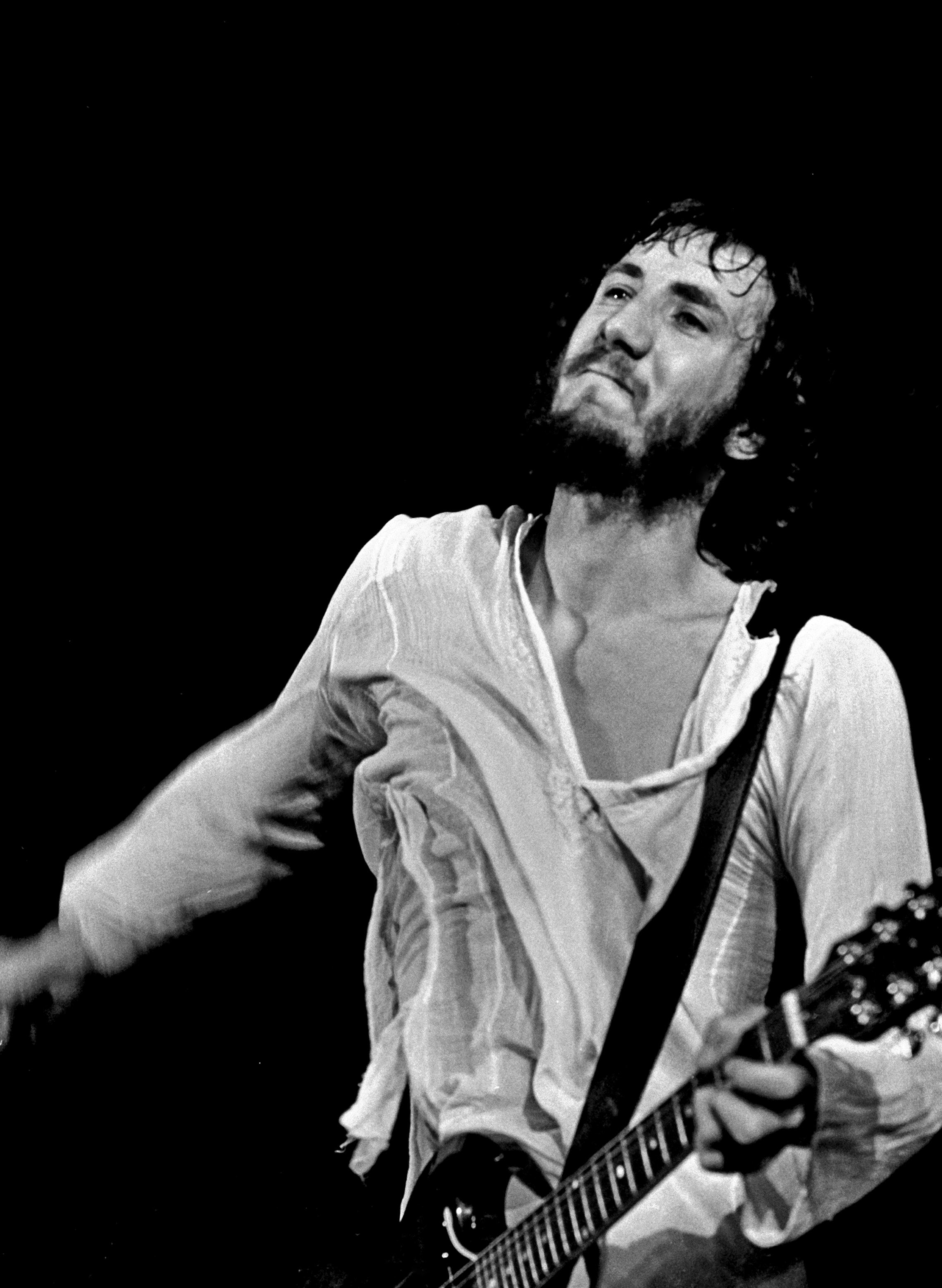
Lennon's guitar strumming in the song has been likened to Pete Townshend's (pictured in 1972) in "Pinball Wizard".

The musicologist Tim Riley and Courrier both deem "Pam" a "punchy" rock and roll track. Lennon sings in an exceptionally coarse Scouse accent to evoke Polythene Pam's roots from the North and her crude demeanour. According to Riley, he intently blurs the words as he sings them. The critic Ian MacDonald writes that the accent "harks back to the band's dirty days in Merseyside divebars". He adds that "heavy pseudo-samba percussion" drives the song along. As the guitar solo commences, Starr strikes the tom drums with pronounced accents at the end of every other measure, assisted by tambourine and more percussion. Lennon's voice is accompanied by scat backing vocals featuring from the third bar of a verse till its end. Several critics liken Lennon's grand, aggressive guitar strumming throughout the song to the Who's "Pinball Wizard", which was a hit at the time; during a studio take of "Pam", Lennon is heard cracking a joke about the album to which "Pinball Wizard" belongs, Tommy. Others have commented on the track's rough sound and rhythm. Steve Hamelman, for instance, remarks that it "pulses madly, as if the mere memory of this 'attractively built' girl could make male hormones rage". Riley writes that "the words are secondary to the groove that's set in motion: three chords and a burning band doused with flippantly clipped absurdity".

=== Music theory ===
Lennon leads the charge with slashing chords from his 12-string acoustic guitar. McCartney helps pump up the quick tempo with a stabbing, round-note bass line, with Ringo Starr contributing a kind of polyrhythmic, tom-heavy beat against a lush backing vocal holding steady 'ah ah ah's. Lennon gives the track a regional flair, singing in a clipped Northern accent ... He also employs a kind of local rhyming slang with exaggerated, hard-syllable sounds ... Following a brief, echo-effected guitar solo, the arrangement transitions into a descending progression, blending seamlessly into the next track without any tape edit, continuing the 'medley.'

— Tom Maginnis for AllMusic

"Pam" is written in common time in the key of E major. The riff and stanzas use the double plagal cadence (♭VII–IV–I; D major–A major–E major) common in rock music; it and variations of it (such as I–♭VII–IV) appear repeatedly in the Beatles catalogue, such as in "The Night Before", "Here Comes the Sun", the chorus of "Dig a Pony", and the coda of "Hey Jude". In terms of structure, "Pam" alternates between an introduction and a verse twice, before returning to the introduction and moving to an outro segueing into the next song. The verse is ten bars long; it can be interpreted as an AABA quatrain tied with a spacer phrase. After a repeated instance of the double plagal cadence, the melody transitions to a flat third chord (G major, but heard as a fifth of flat sixth), then to the dominant seventh (B major), and subsequently leading to a phrase of ♭VI–♭VII–I (C major–D major–E major) that runs twice. The latter phrase is the same one with which "With a Little Help from My Friends" opens. Rhythmically, a motif stressing the last three eighth notes in the first two beats of a bar occurs throughout, the only time such a motif appears on a completed Beatles song. Pollack writes that "Pam"'s melody is "pattering", as in "Mustard": "Like the latter, this one provides melodic contour, such as it minimally exists, by transposing its simple downward motifs up or down the scale. In particular note the chromatic upward crawl in the 3rd phrase."

"Pam" is harmonically similar to "Mustard", written in the same key and using the same chords, barring G major. However, the progressions differ. In "Mustard", the melody starts with the tonic and leads to the subdominant before returning to the tonic, while in "Pam", the melody lines culminate in the tonic. Furthermore, the dominant's role in "Mustard"'s melody is its usual one, to form a complete cadence, but "Pam" relies on a flat seventh chord to form a cadence since the dominant serves only a supporting role.

"Pam" closes with a guitar outro lasting twenty-two bars, making up around forty percent of the song. In its final moments, the instruments slightly slow down their momentum, and Lennon's acoustic guitar enters the lower register. The guitars' bassline walks down the E major scale in steps and half steps (E/D/C#/B). Then, they arrive at A major, the home key of the following song, "She Came In Through the Bathroom Window" as well as the key of the medley's first piece, "You Never Give Me Your Money" (along with A minor). Since "Sun King", the second piece, the medley had decidedly followed E major, and so the return to A major marks a resolution, what Womack sees as "one of the medley's most exciting moments". Everett comments that this return renders the E major a prolonged dominant chord to bring about a "thunderous and affirming" "nonrecapitulatory arrival". A transition in metre to half-time also comes at the beginning of "Bathroom Window". Owing to the song's abridged structure, Pollack writes that "Pam" and its short companion "Mustard" "combine to create a single, unbroken and quite powerful one-two wind up punch of a lead into ['Bathroom Window']".

=== Lyrics ===
Lennon said that Polythene Pam is a "mythical Liverpool scrubber dressed in her jackboots and kilt". She roams the streets at night hunting for attention and earns it in the tabloid News of the World thanks to her bizarre, androgynous clothing choice. She is Mr. Mustard's sister, but their personalities are wholly dissimilar. In the music journalist Jim Beviglia's view, few details about Pam's character are divulged, and those that are all concern her appearance. Besides her kinship with Mr. Mustard, Womack contrasts her with Eleanor Rigby and likens her to the drag queen Sweet Loretta Martin in "Get Back". And he suggests that Pam may be the same person as the unnamed protagonist in the next medley track, "Bathroom Window", who is just as transgressive but morally sounder. He adds:

Polythene Pam's appearance in the News of the World underscores society's prurient interest in her sexuality in spite of its own condemnatory beliefs about her perversions. As with Lady Madonna ... Mean Mr. Mustard and Polythene Pam are byproducts of a bitter urban locale beset by the psychological effects of loneliness and despair.

The scholar Ian Inglis references her when discussing the band's attention to the "selection and placement of names". In their early days, the Beatles often relied on personal prounouns to represent the people in their songs—say, "She says she loves you, and you know you should be glad"—to allow listeners to see themselves in the lyrics and exude everyday feelings and happenings. As they matured as songwriters, the band started deploying character names. Through these names, such as Polythene Pam and Maxwell Edison instead of I and she or that girl, they tell a story, create a world with a distinct place and history where characters act by themselves.

Some critics note that Lennon's cries of yeah, yeah, yeah closing each verse are a deliberate reference to the band's 1963 song "She Loves You"; the group had referenced "She Loves You" once before, in the coda of 1967's "All You Need Is Love". Pollack chews on this observation but also considers whether the yeah, yeah, yeah refrain was "by this point in time just a lazy habit".

== Release and critical reception ==
Apple Records released "Pam" on 26 September 1969 in the United Kingdom and five days later in the United States, as part of Abbey Road. The Kinfauns demo was later issued on Anthology 3 and the 2018 expanded edition of the White Album. The 2019 deluxe reissue of Abbey Road featured take twenty-seven of "Pam", containing some talk and persiflage between the Beatles.

Lennon himself dismissed the song, along with "Mean Mr. Mustard", as "only finished bits of crap I wrote in India". Most critics assessing the Beatles catalogue or Abbey Road as a whole have dedicated one sentence to "Pam", or otherwise named it in passing or not at all. Billboard's Joe Lynch describes it as "another minute-long rocker" following "Mustard". In a contemporary review of the album, Alan Smith deems it a fast "rocker" and says that its guitar breaks called to mind "Summertime Blues". William Mann, another contemporary reviewer, noted the songs between "Sun King" and "Golden Slumbers" in the Long One as "rock-'n'-roll songs that seem to find their tunes in developments of the same initial mood and musical invention", and yet another, John Mendelsohn, writes for Rolling Stone that "Pam" and "Mustard" transfer the listener to "John Lennon's England meeting these two human oddities".

In general rankings of Beatles songs, some music writers such as Bill Wyman lump "Pam" with the rest of the medley and grade them collectively. In their 2023 rankings, the music journalist Michael Gallucci lists it at number 168 out of 229, and fellow journalist Mark Beaumont places it in the bottom quartile, commenting: "'Pinball Wizard' power chords, nifty solo, broad Scouse accent, low-rent S&M; there was so much going on in John's throwaway 70-second rocker about a bizarre sexual encounter in Jersey in 1960 [sic] ... that you wish he'd written a chorus for it." (Note: All three use different criteria to decide what qualifies as a Beatles song.)

== Covers ==
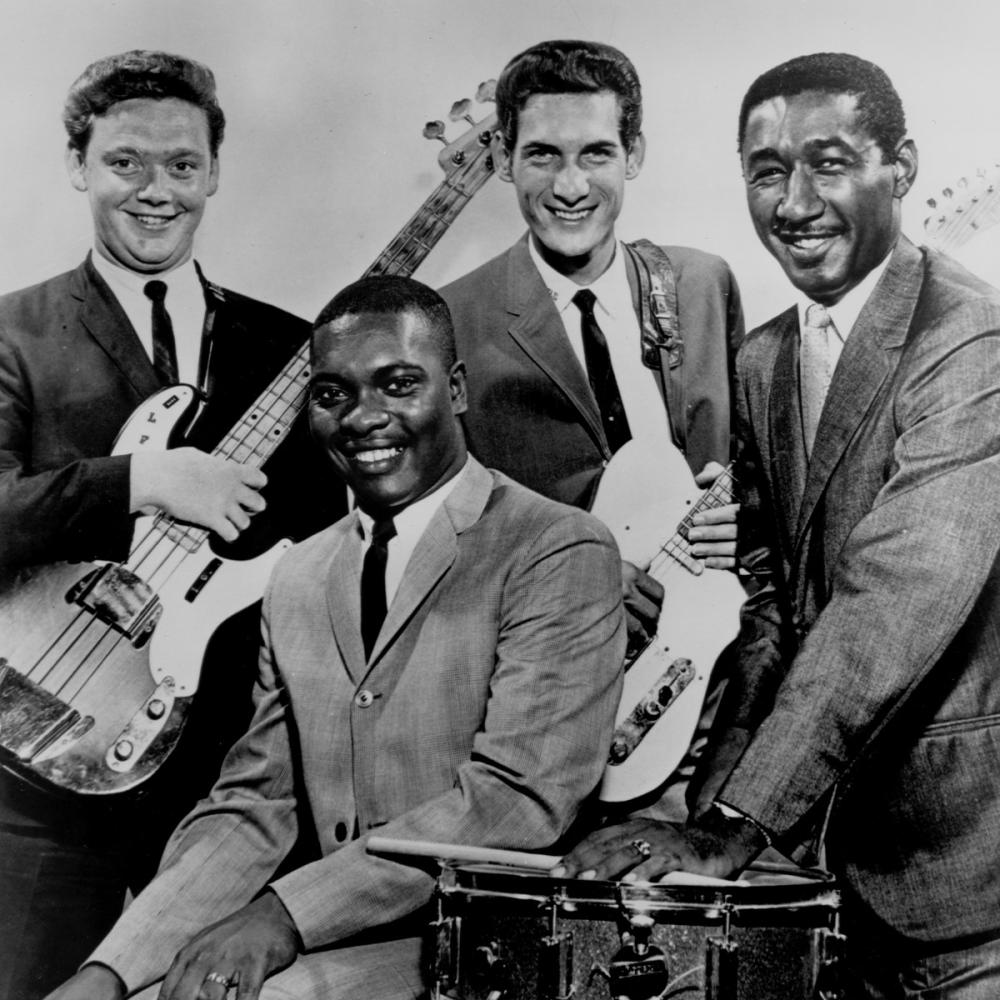
The American jazz and R&B band Booker T. & the M.G.'s (pictured in 1967) covered "Polythene Pam" the year after its release.

Booker T. & the M.G.'s covered "Pam" as well as many other Abbey Road tracks on their 1970 album McLemore Avenue. The album was a mostly instrumental reinvention of the Beatles' work, thought up by Booker T. Jones after hearing it for the first time: "... I thought it was incredibly courageous of The Beatles to drop their format and move out musically like they did. To push the limit like that and reinvent themselves when they had no need to do that. ... The music was just incredible so I felt I needed to pay tribute to it." Roy Wood of Electric Light Orchestra recorded the song for the 1976 musical documentary All This and World War II, and Peter Frampton and the Bee Gees did so for the 1978 Sgt. Peppers Lonely Hearts Club Band film soundtrack. When Mojo magazine released an album of Abbey Road covers, Abbey Road Now!, to commemorate the album's fortieth anniversary, "Pam" featured in a medley with "Mean Mr. Mustard" by the indie rock band Cornershop. The music journalist Paul McGuinness chose this recording as the best cover of both "Mustard" and "Pam".

The music video for the Beatles' 1995 single "Free as a Bird", directed by Joe Pytka, contains nearly a hundred allusions to the Beatles' life and work, among them a girl donning a plastic mac. According to Harry, she is meant to represent Polythene Pam.

== Personnel ==
Writers and scholars disagree somewhat on the instruments composing "Pam" and who played them. And despite the recording takes of "Pam" and "She Came In Through the Bathroom Window" being one and the same, the two tracks have different personnel listings but nevertheless very similar instrumentation. The basic list, agreed upon by Hunter Davies, Walter Everett, Jean-Michel Guesdon and Philippe Margotin, Ian MacDonald, John C. Winn, and Kenneth Womack, is this: (Note: Winn, Womack, and Guesdon and Margotin do not outright distinguish between a lead guitar and a rhythm guitar, but the distinction is implied. Further, some authors such as Davies indicate "vocals" and "backing vocals", so it is understood that the first of these means "lead vocals".)

- John Lennon – lead vocal, twelve-string acoustic guitar
- Paul McCartney – bass guitar
- George Harrison – lead guitar
- Ringo Starr – drums

Other identified parts are these; the writers who mention them are listed in the respective citations: (Note: This list only mentions parts indicated by more than one author; others are mentioned afterwards.)

- McCartney – backing vocal, lead guitar, piano
- Harrison – backing vocal
- ? – tambourine, maracas, cowbell

Winn notes the use of "whipcrack" percussion but does not credit it to anyone. MacDonald writes that McCartney played electric piano. Guesdon and Margotin tentatively indicate a piano part fronted by Lennon and credit another guitar part to McCartney.

== Bibliography ==
=== Books and academic sources ===
- The Beatles (2000). The Beatles Anthology. San Francisco, California: Chronicle Books. ISBN 0-811-82684-8.
- Courrier, Kevin (2009). Artificial Paradise: The Dark Side of the Beatles' Utopian Dream. Westport, Connecticut: Praeger Publishers. ISBN 978-0-313-34586-9.
- Davies, Hunter (2016). The Beatles Book. London, England: Ebury Publishing. ISBN 978-0-09-195863-3.
- Emerick, Geoff; Massey, Howard (2006). Here, There and Everywhere: My Life Recording the Music of the Beatles. New York City, New York: Gotham Books. ISBN 978-1-592-40269-4.
- Everett, Walter (1999). The Beatles As Musicians: Revolver Through the Anthology. New York City, New York: Oxford University Press. ISBN 0-19-512941-5.
- Guesdon, Jean-Michel; Margotin, Philippe (2013). All the Songs: The Story Behind Every Beatles Release. New York City, New York: Black Dog & Leventhal Publishers. ISBN 978-1-57912-952-1.
- Hamelman, Steve (2009). "On Their Way Home: The Beatles in 1969 and 1970". In Womack, Kenneth (ed.). The Cambridge Companion to the Beatles. New York City, New York: Cambridge University Press. pp. 125–41. ISBN 978-0-521-68976-2.
- Harry, Bill (2000) [1992]. The Beatles Encyclopedia (2nd ed.). London, England: Virgin Books. ISBN 0-7535-0481-2.
- Harry, Bill (1997). The Encyclopedia of Beatles People. London, England: Blandford. ISBN 0-7137-2606-7.
- Harry, Bill (2000). The John Lennon Encyclopedia. London, England: Virgin. ISBN 0-7535-0404-9.
- Hertsgaard, Mark (1996). A Day in the Life: The Music and Artistry of the Beatles. London, England: Pan Books. ISBN 0-330-33891-9.
- Ingham, Chris (2006). The Rough Guide to the Beatles (2nd ed.). London, England, & New York City, New York: Rough Guides. ISBN 978-1-84353-720-5.
- Inglis, Ian (2019). "I Call Your Name: Introducing the Cast of the White Album". In Osteen, Mark (ed.). The Beatles Through a Glass Onion: Reconsidering the White Album. Ann Arbor, Michigan: The University of Michigan Press. pp. 127–144. ISBN 978-0-472-07408-2.
- Lewisohn, Mark (1988). The Beatles Recording Sessions. New York City, New York: Harmony Books. ISBN 0-517-57066-1.
- Lewisohn, Mark (2005) [1988]. The Complete Beatles Recording Sessions: The Official Story of the Abbey Road Years 1962–1970. London, England: Bounty Books. ISBN 978-0-7537-2545-0.
- Lewisohn, Mark (1992). The Complete Beatles Chronicle. New York City, New York: Harmony Books. ISBN 0-517-58100-0.
- MacDonald, Ian (2005) [1994]. Revolution in the Head: The Beatles' Records and the Sixties (2nd revised ed.). London, England: Pimlico (Rand). ISBN 1-844-13828-3.
- Martinelli, Dario; Bucciarelli, Paolo (2023). The Beatles and the Beatlesque: A Crossdisciplinary Analysis of Sound, Production and Stylistic Impact. Cham, Switzerland: Springer. ISBN 978-3-031-33803-8.
- Miles, Barry (2002). The Beatles: A Diary: An Intimate Day by Day History. London, England; New York City, New York; & Sydney, New South Wales: Omnibus Press. ISBN 0-7119-9196-0.
- Miles, Barry (1997). Paul McCartney: Many Years from Now. New York City, New York: Henry Holt and Company. ISBN 0-8050-5248-8.
- Pollack, Alan W. (2000). "An Introduction to Notes on the Abbey Road 'Medley' (Medley)". rec.music.beatles. Archived from the original on 27 December 2021.
- Pollack, Alan W. (1999). "Notes on 'Polythene Pam' (PP)". rec.music.beatles. Archived from the original on 24 July 2026.
- Riley, Tim (2002). Tell Me Why – The Beatles: Album by Album, Song by Song, the Sixties and After. Cambridge, Massachusetts: Da Capo Press. ISBN 978-0-306-81120-3.
- Schaffner, Nicholas (1978). The Beatles Forever. New York City, New York: McGraw-Hill. ISBN 0-07-055087-5.
- Sheff, David (2020). Golson, G. Barry (ed.). All We Are Saying: The Last Major Interview with John Lennon and Yoko Ono (40th anniversary ed.). New York City, New York: St. Martin's Griffin. ISBN 978-1-5290-4841-4.
- Turner, Steve (2005). A Hard Day's Write: The Stories Behind Every Beatles Song. New York City, New York: Harper Paperbacks. ISBN 0-06-084409-4.
- Winn, John C. (2009). That Magic Feeling: The Beatles' Recorded Legacy, Volume Two, 1966–1970. New York City, New York: Three Rivers Press. ISBN 978-0-307-45239-9.
- Womack, Kenneth (2014). The Beatles Encyclopedia: Everything Fab Four: A–J. Vol. 1. Santa Barbara, California: Greenwood. ISBN 978-0-313-39171-2.
- Womack, Kenneth (2014). The Beatles Encyclopedia: Everything Fab Four: K–Z. Vol. 2. Santa Barbara, California: Greenwood. ISBN 978-0-313-39171-2.
- Womack, Kenneth (2007). Long and Winding Roads: The Evolving Artistry of the Beatles. New York City, New York, & London, England: Continuum. ISBN 978-0-8264-1746-6.
- Womack, Kenneth (2019). Solid State: The Story of Abbey Road and the End of the Beatles. Ithaca, New York: Cornell University Press. ISBN 978-1-5017-4685-7.

=== Magazines and websites ===
- Beaumont, Mark (2 November 2023). "The Beatles: Every Song Ranked In Order Of Greatness". NME. Archived from the original on 5 October 2025.
- Beviglia, Jim (19 September 2024). "The Beatles' Lyric About a Girl's Odd Wardrobe Choices". American Songwriter. Archived from the original on 8 November 2025.
- Gallucci, Michael (2 November 2023). "All 229 Beatles Songs Ranked Worst to Best". Ultimate Classic Rock. Archived from the original on 25 September 2025.
- Havers, Richard (31 March 2026). "'McLemore Avenue': Booker T. And The MGs Take The Beatles To Stax". uDiscoverMusic. Archived from the original on 2 April 2026.
- Lynch, Joe (26 September 2019). "The Beatles' Abbey Road Turns 50: Classic Track-by-Track Review". Billboard. Archived from the original on 18 January 2025.
- Maginnis, Tom. "Polythene Pam Review by Tom Maginnis". AllMusic.
- Mann, William (5 December 1969). "Those Inventive Beatles". The Times. p. 7. Archived from the original on 29 July 2026 – via The Beatles Bible.
- McGuinness, Paul (26 September 2025). "'Abbey Road' Cover Versions: The Beatles' Classic Album Reimagined". uDiscoverMusic. Archived from the original on 8 March 2026.
- Mendelsohn, John (15 November 1969). "Abbey Road". Rolling Stone. Archived from the original on 5 February 2022.
- Paytress, Mark (2003). "A Passage to India". Mojo. Mojo Special Limited Edition: 1000 Days of Revolution (The Beatles' Final Years – Jan 1, 1968 to Sept 27, 1970). Emap. pp. 10–17.
- Puterbaugh, Parke (12 December 1996). "The Beatles Anthology: 3". Rolling Stone. Archived from the original on 26 May 2022.
- "100 Greatest Beatles Songs [under 23: 'Abbey Road Medley']". Rolling Stone. 20 April 2020. Archived from the original on 30 May 2026.
- Runtagh, Jordan (29 May 2018). "The Beatles' Revelatory White Album Demos: A Complete Guide". Rolling Stone. Archived from the original on 9 May 2024.
- Smith, Alan (20 September 1969). "Abbey Road Album Track-by-Track". NME. No. 1, 184. p. 10. Archived from the original on 22 June 2021.
- "'I'm Better than Ringo; Paul McCartney Told Me!': Bev Bevan's First Meeting with the Beatles". Something Else!. 7 May 2013. Archived from the original on 25 July 2026.
- Stephens, Christopher John (15 November 2018). "The Beatles' 'White Album' Sounds Glorious on the 50th Anniversary Edition". PopMatters. Archived from the original on 8 March 2026.
- "Abbey Road – Remixed (2019)". thebeatles.com. 8 August 2019. Archived from the original on 27 September 2025.
- Williams, Richard (11 September 2019). "'This Tape Rewrites Everything We Knew about the Beatles'". The Guardian. Archived from the original on 9 June 2026.
- Willman, Chris (26 September 2019). "Album Review: The Beatles' 'Abbey Road: Anniversary Edition'". Variety. Archived from the original on 31 January 2026.
- Wyman, Bill (3 November 2023). "All 214 Beatles Songs, Ranked From Worst to Best". Vulture. Archived from the original on 14 September 2025.
