= When a Guitar Plays the Blues =

When a Guitar Plays the Blues may refer to:

- When a Guitar Plays the Blues (Roy Buchanan album), 1985
- When a Guitar Plays the Blues (Roy Lee Johnson album), 1998
