= The Beatles: All These Years =

Book series by Mark Lewisohn

The Beatles: All These Years: Volume One – Tune In
- Author: Mark Lewisohn
- Subject: The Beatles; cultural impact
- Publisher: Little, Brown and Company
- Publication date: 19 October 2013
- Pages: 944 (abridged); 1,728 ("Extended Special" edition)
- ISBN: 978-0-316-72960-4
- Website: marklewisohn.net

The Beatles: All These Years is an ongoing book series about the English rock band the Beatles and their cultural impact. It is being written by the English historian Mark Lewisohn based on research he has continued to gather since the 1980s, having previously authored six books about the band.

Lewisohn officially began writing All These Years in the early 2000s as a response to what he deemed unacceptable standards of research and methodologies used by most of the band's biographers. The first of three expected volumes, Tune In, was published in 2013.

== Background ==
I wasn't happy with the standard of Beatles literature out there. I felt this was a subject that deserved to be explored more comprehensively, more accurately, with greater understanding.

— Mark Lewisohn, 2013

Mark Lewisohn wrote six Beatles reference books throughout the 1980s and 1990s, including The Complete Beatles Recording Sessions. He had expressed a view that there was an oversaturation of Beatles biographies, but in the early 2000s, his feelings changed, as he began to feel that no book had approached the depth or breadth of other serious biographies, such as Robert A. Caro's The Years of Lyndon Johnson.

He began formulating plans for a project of similar scope in 2003. A year later, he was given a £1.2 million advance to write a "definitive" three-part Beatles biography series for the publisher Little, Brown. At the time, it was expected that the books would be finished by 2017.

== Research and content ==
In addition to drawing upon his previous research, Lewisohn devoted six years to researching the first volume in the book. He consulted many people who had never been interviewed before and employed methods "rooted in a psychotherapists' technique" to help them recover lost memories. Other material was drawn from the raw transcripts of Brian Epstein's A Cellarful of Noise and Epstein's personal diaries, schedules and business records.

The Beatles: All These Years: Volume One – Tune In was published on 19 October 2013; the abridged American edition reduced the page count from 1,728 to 944. The coverage spans the 1940s to 1962. Lewisohn described the book as "predominantly ... about Liverpool". One of its major previously unreported accounts concerned George Martin's signing the Beatles to Parlophone Records. The book also explores the many ways in which the band almost broke up and, by detailing the evolution of their concert set lists, illuminates their transition from a covers band into a group performing their own material.

== Reception ==
In his review for The New York Times, John Lennon biographer Tim Riley wrote that "Younger readers will find a profound exploration of how and why rock's aesthetic explosion of the 1960s continues to influence contemporary life in everything from recording production and fashion and celebrity journalism to social mores, gender identities and the internationalization of youth culture." Independent contributor Emily Jupp reviewed that much of the book's accounts are "without precedent and despite a tone of clear, worshipful admiration for the band's music, [Lewisohn] doesn't let his affection cloud his judgement and the book doesn't shy away from exposing the less palatable and less publicised sides of their personalities, such as John Lennon hitting his girlfriends." Music critic Kitty Empire wrote in The Observer that Tune In "has all the heft of the Old Testament, with greater forensic rigour."

Historiographer Erin Torkelson Weber, in her book The Beatles and the Historians, praised volume 1 of All These Years for its superior historical research methods compared with prior Beatle biographies: "Documentation is one of Tune In's strengths: the work includes citations within the text and extensive endnotes, detailing the origin of hundreds of sources. ... Moral judgments are infrequent and balanced. Tune In demonstrates the objectivity essential to writing history."

== Future volumes ==
The second and third volumes, Turn On and Drop Out, are expected to cover the periods from 1963 to 1966 and 1967 to 1969 respectively.

In 2013, Lewisohn estimated that the second volume would be published in 2020 and the third in 2028. In 2018, he tweeted that it was "way too early to say" when he would be able to publish Volume Two. In 2019, he toured England with a stage show, Hornsey Road, that covered the making of the album Abbey Road. The show was assembled to help fund his continued writing of Volume Two. In 2020, Lewisohn's website stated that Volume Two would not be published until 2023 at the earliest. After 2022, his website stated: "I don't know [when the second volume will be published]. When I do, it will be announced and you won't miss it."
