= Royston Ellis =

British writer (1941–2023)

- Ellis photographed by Ida Kar in 1960
- Born: 10 February 1941; Pinner, Middlesex, England
- Died: 27 February 2023 (aged 82); Induruwa, Sri Lanka
- Occupations: Novelist; travel writer; poet; editor

Christopher Royston George Ellis (10 February 1941 – 27 February 2023), known as Royston Ellis, was an English novelist, travel writer and beat poet.

== Biography ==
Born in Pinner, London, Ellis was educated at the Harrow County School for Boys in Middlesex until he left aged 16, determined to be a writer. Two years later, his first book, Jiving to Gyp, a sequence of poems, was published. He performed his poetry on stage and television to backing by Cliff Richard's original group, the Shadows, as well as Jimmy Page, and featured in a 1960 TV documentary, Living for Kicks, presented by Daniel Farson, which brought him to national attention and controversy through his remarks on teenage lifestyle, and as a spokesman of his generation. Among other things, Ellis used drugs, advocated premarital sex, and was actively bisexual.

Ellis wrote two books in 1959 and 1961 about touring with Cliff Richard and The Shadows, republished in 2014 by Tomahawk Press as a rock and roll memoir. In June 1960, he travelled to Liverpool to perform a poetry reading at Liverpool University. As he usually read his poetry with backing from jazz musicians, Ellis searched among the locals for suitable musicians to accompany him and met the young group comprising John Lennon, Paul McCartney, George Harrison and Stuart Sutcliffe. Ellis bonded with Lennon in particular, both sharing an enthusiasm for the American Beat poets, and spent the week at 3 Gambier Terrace with Lennon, Sutcliffe, an dothers. Lennon saw Ellis as "the converging point of rock 'n' roll and literature". Ellis said of the meeting, "I was quite a star for them at that time because I had come up from London and that was a world they didn't really know about". According to Lennon in the International Times: "The first dope, from a Benzedrine inhaler, was given to the Beatles (John, George, Paul and Stuart) by an English cover version of Allen Ginsberg—one Royston Ellis, known as 'beat poet' ... So, give the saint his due."

Ellis said he suggested the re-spelling of Beetles to Beatles, a claim disputed by Beatles biographer Mark Lewisohn as the latter spelling "had appeared in print... a month before [Lennon, McCartney, and Harrison] met [Ellis]".

In 1961, his book The Big Beat Scene was published, surveying pop music at the dawn of the "Swinging Sixties". It was reprinted by Music Mentor Press in 2010, with additional comments. Ellis's novel, Myself For Fame (1964), about a fictional pop star, has a chapter set in Liverpool that seems to recount his experiences with "The Beetles" in 1960. Ellis is one of the people the song "Paperback Writer" was based on, quoting a comment he had made years earlier while in Liverpool, and was also present at a liaison between Lennon and "Polythene Pam" in Guernsey in 1963. In 1980, John Lennon said:

That was me, remembering a little event with a woman in Jersey, and a man who was England's answer to Allen Ginsberg ... I met him when we were on tour and he took me back to his apartment and I had a girl and he had one he wanted me to meet. He said she dressed up in polythene, which she did. She didn't wear jack boots and kilts, I just sort of elaborated. Perverted sex in a polythene bag. Just looking for something to write about."

At 20, Ellis retired from the teenage beatnik and rock and roll scene and left England permanently for a life of travel that took him to East Berlin and Moscow, where he read his poetry on stage with the Russian poet Yevgeni Yevtushenko. Then, via Guernsey, where he became a registered ferry boat engineer, he sailed to the Canary Islands, and acted as an Arab with Cliff Richard in the movie Wonderful Life. He stayed in Las Palmas for three years, becoming the editor of the islands' English language newspaper, The Canary Islands Sun, and wrote three novels.

Ellis hiked around West Africa, then landed up in the British Virgin Islands before settling, in 1966, in Dominica where he wrote the best-selling Bondmaster series of historical novels as Richard Tresillian; as well as becoming President of the Dominica Cricket Association, a member of the MCC and of the Windward Islands Cricket Board of Control, and a Life Fellow of the Royal Commonwealth Society.

In 1979, after his hillside log cabin in Dominica was blown down by Hurricane David, he moved to Sri Lanka where he lived in a colonial cottage overlooking the Indian Ocean.

The author of over 60 published books (guides, novels, biographies and volumes of poetry) he also wrote travel features for inflight, international and Sri Lankan magazines. In 2013, a collection of his beat poetry, Gone Man Squared, was published in the United States by Kicks Books, the imprint of Norton Records.

Ellis died of heart failure at his home in Induruwa, Sri Lanka, on 27 February 2023, at the age of 82.

== Published works ==
=== Poetry ===
- Jiving To Gyp (Scorpion 1959)
- Rave (Scorpion 1960)
- The Rainbow Walking Stick (Scorpion 1961)
- Burn Up (Arts Council Music Viva script 1962)
- A Seaman's Suitcase (Scorpion 1963)
- The Cherry Boy (Turret 1966)
- Gone Man Squared (Complete & Unabridged) with an introduction by Jimmy Page, Kicks Books, New York City, 2013. (ISBN 9780965977791)

=== Fiction ===
==== as Royston Ellis ====
- Myself For Fame (Consul 1963)
- The Flesh Merchants (Tandem 1966)
- The Rush At The End (Tandem 1967)
- A Hero In Time (Times, Singapore 2000)
- Season of the Peacock (in What Love Is short story collection, Arcadia Books, 2010)
- " Beach Shorts" stories for Holiday Reading co-authored with Ruth Smith in 2021

==== as Richard Tresillian ====
- The Bondmaster (Sphere/Warners, 1977)
- Blood of the Bondmaster (Sphere/Warners, 1978)
- The Bondmaster Breed (Sphere/Warners, 1979)
- Fleur (Sphere/Warner, 1979)
- Bondmaster Fury (Sphere, 1982)
- Bondmaster Revenge (Sphere, 1983)
- Bondmaster Buck (Sphere, 1984)
- Master of Black River (Futura 1984)
- Black River Affair (Futura, 1985)
- Black River Breed (Futura, 1985)
- Bloodheart (Sphere, 1985)
- Bloodheart Royal (Sphere 1986)
- Bloodheart Feud (Sphere, 1987)
- Giselle (Sphere 1988)
- Bloodheart (Sri Lanka 2009, in Sinhala)

=== Biographies ===
- Driftin’ With Cliff Richard (Chas Buchan, 1960)
- Rebel, the story of James Dean (Consul 1961)
- The Big Beat Scene (Four Square 1961)
  - The Big Beat Scene (Music Mentor Books, 2010)
- The Shadows By Themselves (Consul 1961)
- A Man for All Islands – President Gayoom of Maldives (Times 1998)
- Toni, the Maldives Lady (Times, 1999)
- My Log Book, 1947–2008: Ali Umar Maniku (Singapore 2010)

=== Travel ===
- India By Rail (Bradt 1989, 1992, 1995)
  - India By Rail (in German, 1990)
  - India By Rail (in French, 1993)
- Bradt Guide to Mauritius (Bradt, 1988 – 2014)
  - Bradt Guide to Mauritius (in German, 1990)
- History of the Grand Hotel (Sri Lanka, 1991)
- History of the Tea Factory Hotel (Sri Lanka 1993)
- Sri Lanka By Rail (Bradt 1994)
- Seeing Sri Lanka By Train (Sri Lanka, 1995)
- Bradt Guide to Maldives (Bradt 1995, 2000, 2005, 2008)
  - Bradt Guide to Maldives (in Italian, 2008)
  - Bradt Guide to Maldives (in Russian, 2009)
- A Maldives Celebration (Times 1998)
- Festivals of the World: Trinidad (Times 1999)
- Festivals of the World: Madagascar (Times 1999)
- On The Wings Of Freedom (Sri Lanka, 1998)
- The Sri Lanka Story (Sri Lanka, 2002)
- Bradt Guide to Sri Lanka (Bradt, 2000, 2005, 2008, 2011, 2014)
- Story of Full Moon (Maldives 2003)
- Story of Baros (Maldives, 2004)
- The Growing Years: History of the Ceylon Planters' Association (Sri Lanka, 2004)
- Insight Pocket Guide to Maldives (Insight, 2006)
- Twenty Years Uncovered: The MAS Story (Sri Lanka 2008)
- Indian Railways Handbook (2008)
- Berlitz Pocket Guide to Maldives (Berlitz 2007)
- Great Train Journeys of The World (Time Out, 2009, contributor)
- Sri Lanka Step by Step (Insight Guide 2010)
- The Kurumba Story (Maldives, 2012)
- Baros A Legend (2013)
