= Roy Lee Johnson =

American R&B and soul songwriter, singer and guitarist

- Born: Roy Lee Johnson; 31 December 1938
- Origin: Centralhatchee, Georgia, U.S.
- Died: 3 June 2024 (aged 85)
- Genres: R&B, soul, blues, funk
- Occupations: Singer, songwriter, guitarist
- Instruments: Guitar, vocals
- Years active: c. 1955–2024
- Labels: Stat, Okeh, Columbia, Josie, Stax, Southern Tracks

Roy Lee Johnson (December 31, 1938 – June 3, 2024) was an American R&B and soul songwriter, singer, and guitarist. He is best known for his composition "Mr. Moonlight", which has been covered by many artists, including the Beatles. Johnson is recognized as an influence on the bands that made up the British Invasion.

He was born in Centralhatchee, Georgia, and began playing guitar as a child. Around 1955, he joined his first band, The Brassettes, who included Robert Ward and who played local dances in and around Hogansville. After the band won a talent contest in Atlanta, they recorded Johnson's song, "Nobody Does Something For Nothing", for the small Stat label. In the late 1950s, Johnson moved to Ohio, joining Ward in the Ohio Untouchables. However, by 1961 he had returned to Atlanta, and began playing in Piano Red's band, the Interns. His song "Mr. Moonlight", which he had written in high school, was first recorded by Piano Red, credited as "Dr. Feelgood and the Interns", and released in 1962 as the b-side of "Doctor Feel-Good" on OKeh 4-7144.

Johnson left the Interns in 1963, and released his first solo record, "Too Many Tears", on OKeh that year. Neither it nor its follow-up, a reworked "Nobody Does Something For Nothing", were successful. However, in 1964 the Beatles covered "Mr. Moonlight" on the album Beatles for Sale (on Beatles '65 in the US), the success of which allowed Johnson to form his own band. He recorded three singles for Columbia Records in 1966-67, including "My Best Just Ain't Good Enough", and another single for the Josie label. Otis Redding, for whom he had previously been a support act, then introduced him to Phil Walden, who recorded three singles with him in 1968 at the FAME Studios in Muscle Shoals, featuring the studio rhythm section. The singles included "Cheer Up, Daddy's Coming Home" and "Take Me Back and Try Me", but again were not hits. He then formed a new band, Roy Lee Johnson & The Villagers, who recorded a self-titled album for Stax Records in 1973, influenced by the funk style of James Brown. However, the band broke up after the sudden death of 21-year-old bass player Michael James.

He continued to release occasional singles in the late 1970s and 1980s, setting up his own studio and continuing to perform with various bands. In the early 1990s, tracks he had recorded were released in the UK as the album All Night Long (Howzat LBW1). He released another album, When a Guitar Plays the Blues, in 1998.

Johnson died on June 3, 2024, at the age of 85.
