= She Came In Through the Bathroom Window =

1969 song by the Beatles

- Northern Songs sheet music cover

Song by the Beatles

from the album Abbey Road
- Released: 26 September 1969 (UK)
- Recorded: 25–30 July 1969
- Studio: EMI, London
- Genre: Rock
- Length: 1:57
- Label: Apple
- Songwriters: Paul McCartney, credited to Lennon–McCartney
- Producer: George Martin

Abbey Road medley chronology
"Polythene Pam"	"She Came In Through the Bathroom Window"	"Golden Slumbers"

Official audio
- "She Came In Through the Bathroom Window" on YouTube

"She Came In Through the Bathroom Window" is a song by the English rock band the Beatles from their 1969 album Abbey Road. Composed by Paul McCartney in New York City, it is the fifth song of the album's climactic medley, immediately following "Polythene Pam". He took his inspiration from an event that struck before May 1968: a group of doggedly loyal but innocent Beatles fans, named the Apple scruffs, broke into McCartney's home in St John's Wood and stole some of his belongings. As he rode to Kennedy Airport, he came up with the final line beginning with "So I quit the police department", thus completing the lyrics. "Bathroom Window" was recorded as one piece with "Polythene Pam" over three days in late July 1969. Joe Cocker's 1970 cover of the song saw commercial success; Ike and Tina Turner released a version in the early 1970s as well.

== Origin ==
=== The song ===
Paul McCartney wrote "Bathroom Window", after the inspiration came to him on 11 May 1968 while in New York City to launch the band's record label Apple Corps. (Note: While McCartney wrote "She Came In Through the Bathroom Window", it is credited to Lennon–McCartney.) His main source was the Apple scruffs, a group of devoted Beatles fans who camped nearby Abbey Road Studios; McCartney called them "the Eyes and Ears of the World" since they always seemed to know of the Beatles' doings and whereabouts. One day, Diane Ashley and some of her fellow scruffs broke into his St John's Wood home. She told Beatles historian Steve Turner in 1994:

"We were bored, he was out and so we decided to pay him a visit. We found a ladder in his garden and stuck it up at the bathroom window which he'd left slightly open. I was the one who climbed up and got in."

They raided his wardrobe for a pair of trousers, which they took turns wearing, and stole a framed photograph and many other items but later returned the picture at McCartney's request. Another Apple scruff, Margo Bird, confirmed this account. In spite of this event, Apple scruffs rarely behaved disloyally towards the Beatles. Apple Corps' press officer Derek Taylor recalled that the scruffs only sought to support the group, and their day-to-day hope was to meet or see one of the Beatles in person.

McCartney found himself stuck on the final verse, but conceived of one beginning with "So I quit the police department" after seeing a police identification panel on a taxi he rode to Kennedy Airport; it contained a mug shot of the driver and his name resting above the words New York Police Dept. McCartney recalled: "This was the great thing about the randomness of it all. If I hadn't been in this guy's cab, or if it had been someone else driving, the song would have been different. Also I had a guitar there so I could solidify it into something straight away." He had brought his guitar with him to New York, restoring a habit of his dating back to the Beatles' early days in Liverpool.

=== The Abbey Road medley ===
When working on Abbey Road, the Beatles did not know that their time as a band was fast moving towards divorce. (Note: Traditional works of Beatles scholarship state otherwise, but their account has since fallen out of favour. For example, Ian MacDonald writes in Revolution in the Head (2005) that the group, conscious of their fate, gave their assent for the medley mostly to close their career together with a majestic ending, a celebration.) (Note: Still, some people close to the Beatles had their suspicions. The sound engineeer Alan Parsons, who worked on Abbey Road, wrote in the foreword to Solid State (2019): "I also knew that, realistically speaking, Abbey Road would be the last time the Beatles would be the Beatles." George Martin too sensed an unmistakable end to their partnership, and Ethan Russell gathered from the photoshoots for the album cover that "they were not a happy group". While he did not know for sure, George Harrison said that "it felt as if we were reaching the end of the line".) Lennon originally wanted a rock and roll album, and McCartney, a pop symphony/opera, so the album was split two ways: the first side contained individual songs, and most of the second was a sixteen-minute medley. The idea for the medley was McCartney's, and the group's producer George Martin claimed his share of credit in its creation in wanting "to get John and Paul to think more seriously about their music". He had long been advising the group to "think symphonically", to use motifs and complex structures and forms. Thus, the medley's songs, short "half" songs, are connected in some way by thematic or tonal coherence and link together through segues and fades.

== Composition ==
"Bathroom Window" is written in the key of A major and in 4/4 time throughout.

In the final moments of the preceding track, "Polythene Pam", the guitars' bassline walks down the E major scale in steps and half steps (E/D/C#/B). Then, they arrive at A major, the home key of "Bathroom Window" as well as the key of the medley's first piece, "You Never Give Me Your Money" (along with A minor). Since "Money", the medley had followed E major, and so the return to A major marks a resolution, hence "one of the medley’s most exciting moments", as Womack sees it.

== Recording ==
"Bathroom Window" was recorded together with the song preceding it in the medley, "Polythene Pam", as one track, like "Sun King" and "Mean Mr. Mustard". This happened across three days, on 25, 28, and 30 July 1969, in thirty-nine takes. The Beatles recorded the basic track for "Pam"/"Bathroom Window" at EMI Studio Two in London on 25 July; Ringo Starr plays his Ludwig Hollywood Maple drum kit, Harrison, his Gibson Les Paul Standard electric guitar, McCartney, his Rickenbacker 4001S bass, and Lennon plays his Framus Hootenanny twelve-string guitar.

McCartney sang an off-mike guide vocal on "Bathroom Window", while Lennon did the same on "Pam". At the very beginning of "Bathroom Window", in anticipation of the change of tempo, Lennon gives out a laugh and then shouts "Oh, look out!".

Take 27 of "She Came In Through the Bathroom Window"
- She Came In Through the Bathroom Window (Take 27) on YouTube

The band carried out overdubs on the track on 28 July: maracas, tambourine, cowbell, and other instrumental parts were scattered across by all four members. (Note: The attribution of these percussion parts to the Beatles' usual drummer, Starr, is tenuous, since some writers do not credit them to him and others suggest that his bandmates played them. Womack, for instance, notes in his biography of Abbey Road: "The overdubs were rife with additional percussion too, with everyone chipping in with a range of instruments, including maracas, tambourine, and cowbell." (emphasis added)) That day, writes Womack, Lennon contributed more acoustic guitar and electric piano to the recording shortly before purging them. According to the Beatles historian John C. Winn, many of the overdubs were in fact cut. Recording ended on 30 July, when the final vocal, guitar, and percussion overdubs were taped; these included Harrison's second lead guitar part comprising the descending notes into the start of "Bathroom Window". During the next few hours, George Martin and his fellow producers began stitching, through edits and crossfades, all the medley pieces together into a congruent whole and mixing them for stereo; this was only a trial to spotlight flaws and imperfections. After listening to the transitions between them, the group accepted that of "Pam"/"Bathroom Window". On August 14, mixing was finished, and seven days later, the medley was mastered and finally assembled. "Pam" and "Bathroom Window" fused into the Long One "without the slightest hint of a pause between the [former and 'Mean Mr. Mustard', the song preceding it in the medley]", as Womack notes. The move from "Pam" to "Bathroom Window" is likewise fluid. Martin produced "Pam", and Emerick and Phil McDonald, along with John Kurlander and Alan Parsons, engineered it.

== Release and reception ==
Apple Records released "Bathroom Window" on 26 September 1969 in the UK and five days later in the US, as part of Abbey Road. A slower version of this song, recorded in late January 1969 during the Get Back sessions, appears on the 1996 compilation Anthology 3, while an in-progress version is featured on the 2021 Let It Be 50th Anniversary Edition.

Dennis Jovenetti of Utah State University's Student Life paper cited it and "Because" as an example of the medley's, as well as overall album's, musical diversity. He categorized it as hard rock, with "very fine" guitar fills from Harrison between the lyrics. Ritchie Yorke of the Houston Post called it "a very good song of Paul's with great lyrics." Jovenetti noted that Abbey Road placed more stress on the words than all previous Beatles albums, and cited the line: "So I quit the police department, and got myself a steady job", as an example.

== Personnel ==
Writers and scholars disagree somewhat on the parts composing "Bathroom Window" and who played or sang them. And despite the recording takes of "Bathroom Window" and "Polythene Pam" being one and the same, the two tracks have different personnel listings but nevertheless very similar instrumentation. Hunter Davies, Walter Everett, Jean-Michel Guesdon and Philippe Margotin, Ian MacDonald, John C. Winn, and Kenneth Womack, concur with this list: (Note: Winn, Womack, and Guesdon and Margotin do not outright distinguish between a lead guitar and a rhythm guitar, but the distinction is implied. Further, some authors such as Davies indicate "vocals" and "backing vocals", so it is understood that the first of these means "lead vocals"; the same applies for those such as Womack who only mark one vocal part.)

- Paul McCartney – lead vocal, bass guitar
- John Lennon – twelve-string acoustic guitar
- George Harrison – lead guitar
- Ringo Starr – drums

Other identified parts are these; the writers who mention them are listed in the respective citations: (Note: This list only mentions parts indicated by more than one author; others are mentioned afterwards.)

- McCartney – lead guitar, piano
- Lennon – backing vocal
- Harrison – backing vocal
- ? – tambourine, maracas, cowbell

Winn notes the use of "whipcrack" percussion but does not credit it to anyone. MacDonald writes that McCartney plays electric piano. Guesdon and Margotin credit another guitar part to McCartney and uncertainly indicate a piano part fronted by Lennon.

== Covers ==
"She Came In Through the Bathroom Window"
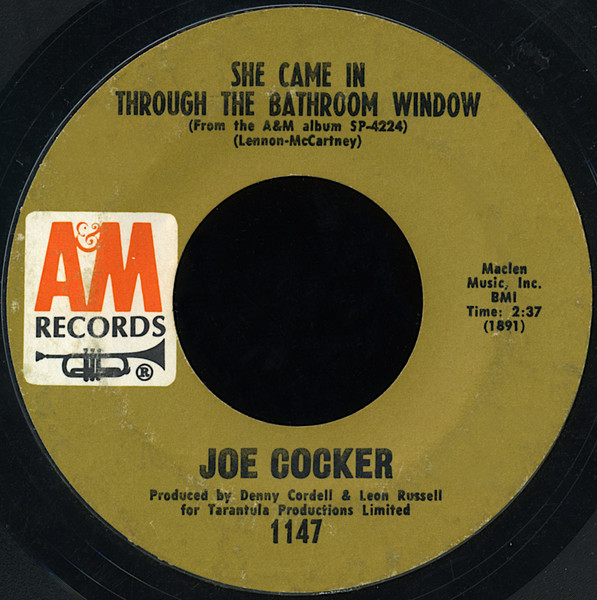
- A&M record, 1969

Single by Joe Cocker

from the album Joe Cocker!
- Released: 5 November 1969
- Recorded: c. late 1969
- Genre: Rock
- Length: 2:37
- Label: A&M
- Songwriters: John Lennon; Paul McCartney
- Producers: Leon Russell; Denny Cordell

Official audio
- "She Came In Through the Bathroom Window" on YouTube

In 1970, Joe Cocker's cover of this song reached number 30 on the Billboard top 40, number 18 on the Dutch Single Top 100, and 19 on the Dutch Top 40. The Austin Chronicle's Raoul Hernandez, reporting on Cocker's performance at Wimberley, Texas, opined his three Beatles covers, including "She Came In Through the Bathroom Window" "were worth the proverbial price of admission".

Ike and Tina Turner released a cover of this song as a European single from their 1972 album Feel Good. Music journalist Lindsay Zoladz, crowning it one of Tina Turner's best rock covers, argues that her rendition shapes the Beatles' casual account of the Apple scruffs' theft into a mature, urgent lyric, with the words: "He said he’d always been a hustler, said he worked about 15 hours a day". A version features on their 1973 double album of live performances across Europe, The World of Ike & Tina, which Record World notes as a "[r]ough, raunchy [rocker]" alongside other covers on the album.
