= The Complete Beatles Recording Sessions =

Beatles reference book by Mark Lewisohn

- Cover of the UK edition
- Author: Mark Lewisohn
- Publisher: Hamlyn (UK); Harmony Books (US)
- Publication date: September 1988
- ISBN: 0-600-55798-7

The Complete Beatles Recording Sessions (subtitled The Official Story of the Abbey Road Years 1962–1970) (Note: Harmony Books released the book in the US as The Beatles Recording Sessions, subtitled The Official Abbey Road Studio Session Notes, 1962–1970.) is a 1988 reference book on the Beatles written by Mark Lewisohn. It was published by Hamlyn in the UK and by Harmony Books in the US.

The book is written in the form of a diary, documenting each day from 1962 through 1970 that the Beatles spent in a recording session or producers and engineers spent mixing and editing their music. The book has been widely described as an "essential" reference book for study of the band.

== Background ==
In the early 1980s, John Barrett, a balance engineer employed by EMI, found himself unoccupied while undergoing chemotherapy. Ken Townsend, the General Manager of Abbey Road Studios, later recalled suggesting Barrett keep his mind engaged by listening to the Beatles' session tapes and write down information pertaining to them. Author Stephen Matteo alternatively suggests Barrett's work was intended to gather interesting unreleased material for The Beatles at Abbey Road, a 1983 multimedia presentation at Abbey Road Studios. Barrett produced a colour-coded catalogue, which Townsend later said displayed an "incredible" attention to detail. In 1982, while attending Liverpool's annual Beatles convention, Townsend, Barrett and author Brian Southall used Barrett's work during a Q&A session. Attendees were enthusiastic about the new information and suggested the catalogue be published, but Barrett's death in 1984 precluded it. The project was nearly abandoned until Abbey Road employee Kathryn Varley pushed for its completion.

Mark Lewisohn began formally researching the Beatles in the late 1970s, working as a research assistant for Philip Norman's book Shout! (1981). In 1986, Lewisohn published his first reference book, The Beatles Live!, a chronological guide of the group's live performances. The book took years to research and compiles over 1,000 primary sources to provide an exhaustive guide.

Imagine what it was like for me, walking into Abbey Road Studios, opening tape boxes that had not been touched since they were shelved 20 years ago, and listening through professional equipment to the Beatles' recording-session tapes. I was able to sit in a control room at the studio where the Beatles worked, doing my own mixes and isolating tracks, and I can honestly say I was surprised by everything I heard.

— Mark Lewisohn, 1988

Because of his work compiling The Beatles Live!, EMI commissioned Lewisohn in 1987 to continue Barrett's work and write a book detailing the Beatles' recording sessions. Besides Abbey Road Studios staffers and the Beatles, Lewisohn was the first person granted access to listen to all of the Beatles' working tapes, a privilege not extended again until 1995 for writer Mark Hertsgaard. Working from 1987 through 1988, the book took two years to research and write. Lewisohn consulted the studio's recording paperwork, reproducing some of it in the book, and interviewed eighty people who were present at the sessions, including the Beatles' producer George Martin, publicist Derek Taylor and engineer Geoff Emerick. Besides Barrett's previous research, the collection of Beatles recordings stored at Abbey Road Studios had never been properly archived. Listening to over four hundred hours of tapes, Lewisohn's working process served the dual purpose of both researching the book as well as organising the collection, cataloguing its various mixes, submixes, mastertakes and outtakes.

== Publication and content ==
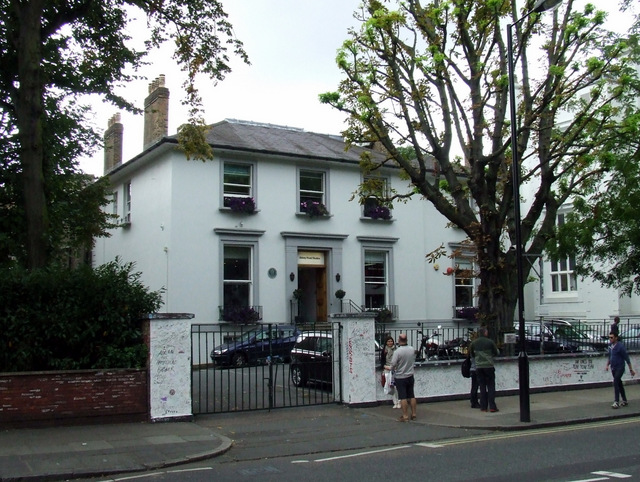
Lewisohn researched at London's Abbey Road Studios (formerly EMI Studios), where the Beatles recorded most of their music.

Hamlyn published The Complete Beatles Recording Sessions in the UK in September 1988. A book launch was held on 26 September at Abbey Road Studios, with wax figures of the Beatles temporarily moved to the studio from London's Madame Tussauds wax museum for the event. Harmony Books published it in the US the following month, re-titled as The Beatles Recording Sessions. (Note: Harmony released a paperback edition on 23 March 1990.)

Spanning 204 pages, most of The Complete Beatles Recording Session is written in the form of a diary detailing each day either the Beatles spent in a recording session or producers and engineers spent mixing and editing their music. The diary begins with the band's first recording session at EMI Recording Studios on 6 June 1962, while drummer Pete Best was still in the band, and finishes on 8 May 1970 with the release of the album Let It Be. (Note: Lewisohn 1988, pp. 16–17, 199.) The book includes a one-page preface by Ken Townsend and a ten-page interview between Lewisohn and Paul McCartney.

Each entry first notes the date; the studio location, usually EMI or Apple Studios; the session time; the songs recorded or mixed, including the number of takes; and the names of the producer and engineers involved. Lewisohn then writes about the details of the particular session, such as overdubbing, false starts and studio chatter, as well as information about session musicians, orchestration and any other related information. He discusses the fate of various session tapes, the differences between mono and stereo mixes and the technical advancements first pioneered on the Beatles' recordings. UK release dates of singles, albums and EPs are also mentioned, discussing their chart success and sales numbers. (Note: Most EPs released in the UK were made up of material that had already been released on earlier albums. The book only discusses those EPs with previously unreleased material: Long Tall Sally and Magical Mystery Tour. (Note: Lewisohn 1988, pp. 46, 131.))

Following the diary entries, the book includes a complete discography of all the Beatles' UK and US releases, including singles, EPs and albums. (Note: Lewisohn 1988, pp. 200–201.) It concludes with a glossary of recording industry terms and a note from Townsend on the recording technology used by the band. (Note: Lewisohn 1988, p. 204; Townsend 1988b, p. 204.)

== Impact and legacy ==
The book has been widely described as an "essential" Beatles reference book and required reading for anyone attempting a serious study of the band. In Michael Brocken and Melissa Davis's guide to Beatles literature, The Beatles Bibliography, they describe it as "one of the cornerstones of Beatles scholarship", and the authors Stuart Shea and Robert Rodriguez characterise it as "[p]ossibly the most important Beatles book ever published", writing it was a "landmark" by providing the general public with so much previously unknown information.

The book contained a number of revelations that countered the accepted wisdom. ... Like its predecessors Lennon Remembers and Shout!, The Complete Beatles Recording Sessions impacted all subsequent scholarship on the group.

— Historiographer Erin Torkelson Weber, 2016

Later writers have relied heavily on the book's research. The critic Tim Riley writes the book is "indispensable for close listening", and the authors Ian MacDonald and Mark Hertsgaard each described it as being indispensable for the research of their own books, Revolution in the Head (1994) and A Day in the Life (1995), respectively. Hertsgaard writes it is "superb, but superb in the way an encyclopedia is superb", contending that it provides much more than the typical reader would expect, leaving a book that "focuses more on the trees than on the forest".

The authors Stephen Thomas Erlewine, Chris Ingham and Colin Fleming each praise the book as engrossing in its narrative of each particular recording session, though Fleming finds some of Lewisohn's descriptions of songs lacking. Riley similarly criticises Lewisohn for writing more like a fan than a critic, with his descriptions reliant on adjectives like "brilliant" rather than evaluating a recording's "color, texture and mood". Writing in 2009 for The Cambridge Companion to the Beatles, John Kimsey wrote that the "'definitive' [account]" of the band's recording history and studio practices has since been "supplanted" by Kevin Ryan and Brian Kehew's 2006 book, Recording the Beatles.

The Complete Beatles Recording Sessions was one of the first books to document a band or artist through their recording sessions. Similar works covering Elvis Presley, Bob Dylan and Jimi Hendrix were written following its release. (Note: See Jorgensen 1998, Heylin 1995 and McDermott 1995.) In the introduction to his 1995 book on Dylan's recording sessions, Clinton Heylin acknowledges that Lewisohn's book remains "perhaps the best-known 'sessionography'". David Hunter of the University of Texas at Austin describes the book as a "bio-discography" – a portmanteau of biography and discography – illustrating the Beatles' progression and story through study of their recorded music. He writes that it serves as "the standard by which all bio-discographies will be measured". Lewisohn's 1992 book, The Complete Beatles Chronicle, combines the work of The Complete Beatles Recording Sessions with The Beatles Live! to provide an exhaustive day-by-day account of the group.

== Bibliography ==
Books

- Badman, Keith (2001). The Beatles Diary Volume 2: After The Break-Up 1970–2001. London: Omnibus Press. ISBN 0-7119-8307-0.
- Brocken, Michael; Davis, Melissa (2012). The Beatles Bibliography: A New Guide to the Literature. Manitou Springs: Beatle Works Ltd. ISBN 978-0-615-67065-2.
- Greenwald, Ted (1997). The Long and Winding Road: An Intimate Guide to the Beatles. New York City: MetroBooks. ISBN 978-1-56799-623-4.
- Hertsgaard, Mark (1995). A Day in the Life: The Music and Artistry of the Beatles. New York City: Delacorte Press. ISBN 0-385-31377-2.
- Heylin, Clinton (1995). Bob Dylan: The Recording Sessions, 1960–1994. New York City: St. Martin's Press. ISBN 0-312-13439-8.
- Ingham, Chris (2006). The Rough Guide to the Beatles (2nd ed.). London: Rough Guides. ISBN 978-1-84353-720-5.
- Jorgensen, Ernst (1998). Elvis Presley: A Life in Music: The Complete Recording Sessions. New York City: St. Martin's Press. ISBN 0-312-18572-3.
- Kimsey, John (2009). ""An abstraction, like Christmas": the Beatles for sale and for keeps". In Womack, Kenneth (ed.). The Cambridge Companion to the Beatles. Cambridge: Cambridge University Press. pp. 230–254. ISBN 978-0-521-68976-2.
- Kramer, Howard (2009). "Rock and roll music". In Womack, Kenneth (ed.). The Cambridge Companion to the Beatles. Cambridge: Cambridge University Press. pp. 65–74. ISBN 978-0-521-68976-2.
- Lewisohn, Mark (1988). The Complete Beatles Recording Session. London: Hamlyn. ISBN 978-0-600-63561-1.
- MacDonald, Ian (2007). Revolution in the Head: The Beatles' Records and the Sixties (Third ed.). Chicago: Chicago Review Press. ISBN 978-1-55652-733-3.
- Matteo, Stephen (2004). Let It Be. 33⅓ series. New York City: Continuum. ISBN 978-0-8264-1634-6.
- McDermott, John (1995). Jimi Hendrix: The Complete Studio Recording Sessions 1963–1970. Chicago: Little, Brown. ISBN 0-316-87666-6.
- Riley, Tim (2002). Tell Me Why: The Beatles: Album by Album, Song by Song, the Sixties and After (Revised and Updated ed.). Cambridge: Da Capo Press. ISBN 978-0-306-81120-3.
- Shea, Stuart; Rodriguez, Robert (2007). Fab Four FAQ: Everything Left to Know About the Beatles ... and More!. New York City: Hal Leonard Books. ISBN 978-1-4234-2138-2.
- Shenk, Joshua Wolf (2014). Powers of Two: Finding the Essence of Innovation in Creative Pairs. New York City: Houghton Mifflin Harcourt. ISBN 978-0-544-03159-3.
- Townsend, Ken (1988a). Preface. The Complete Beatles Recording Sessions. By Lewisohn, Mark. London: Hamlyn. p. 4. ISBN 978-0-600-63561-1.
- Townsend, Ken (1988b). "The Recording Technology". The Complete Beatles Recording Sessions. By Lewisohn, Mark. London: Hamlyn. p. 204. ISBN 978-0-600-63561-1.
- Turner, Steve (2005). A Hard Day's Write: The Stories Behind Every Beatles Song (New and Updated ed.). New York City: HarperCollins. ISBN 978-0-06-084409-7.
- Weber, Erin Torkelson (2016). The Beatles and the Historians: An Analysis of Writings about the Fab Four. Jefferson, North Carolina: McFarland & Company. ISBN 978-1-4766-2470-9.

Journal, magazine and newspaper articles

- Anon. (27 September 1988). "n.t." Daily Mirror. p. 13.
- Beller-McKenna, Daniel (2003). "Review of The Beatles as Musicians: The Quarry Men through Rubber Soul". Notes. 59 (3): 614–615. doi:10.1353/not.2003.0002. ISSN 0027-4380. JSTOR 901044. S2CID 192088720.
- de Lisle, Tim (24 September 1988). "All you need is facts". The Daily Telegraph. p. XV – via Newspapers.com.
- Hunter, David (1990). "Review of The Beatles: Recording Sessions". Notes. 46 (3): 641–642. doi:10.2307/941438. ISSN 0027-4380. JSTOR 941438.
- Hunter, David (1993). "Two Half-Centuries of Music Bibliography". Notes. 50 (1): 23–38. doi:10.2307/898686. ISSN 0027-4380. JSTOR 898686.
- Jones, Peter (15 October 1988). "Wax 'Beatles' Move To Abbey Road" (PDF). Billboard. p. 67.
- Kiley, Penny (9 November 1988). "Getting the Beatles Taped". Liverpool Echo. p. 6 – via Newspapers.com.
- Kozinn, Allan (29 November 1988). "Details of Eight Years in the Life of the Beatles as They Worked". The New York Times. pp. C17–C18 – via TimesMachine.
- Lewis, Michael (20 October 1988). "Fab Four's secrets on the record". Westminster & Pimlico News. p. 22 – via Newspapers.com.
- MacCambridge, Michael (2 October 1988). "Lopsided Lennon". Austin American-Statesman. p. D4 – via Newspapers.com.
- Zak, Albin J. (2005). "'Edition-ing' Rock". American Music. 23 (1): 95–107. doi:10.2307/4153042. ISSN 0734-4392. JSTOR 4153042.
