= Candie Gardens =

Park in St Peter Port, Guernsey

Candie Cardens
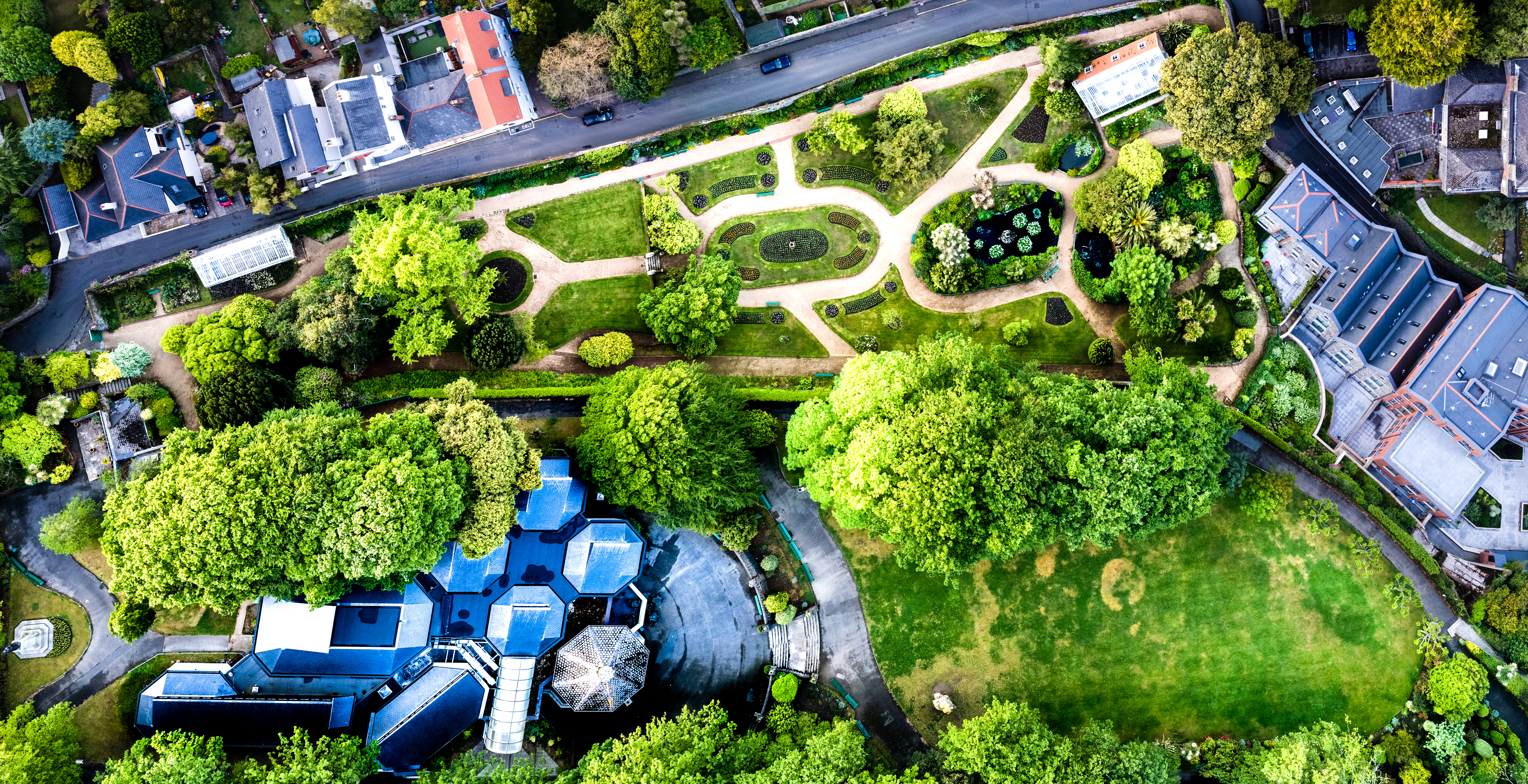
- Candie Gardens from the air
- Interactive map of Candie Cardens
- Location: St Peter Port
- Created: 1894

Candie Gardens is a park in St Peter Port, Guernsey, originally established as a Victorian pleasure gardens in 1894.

== Origins ==
The gardens were originally those of Candie House, and became a public park in 1894.

== Features ==
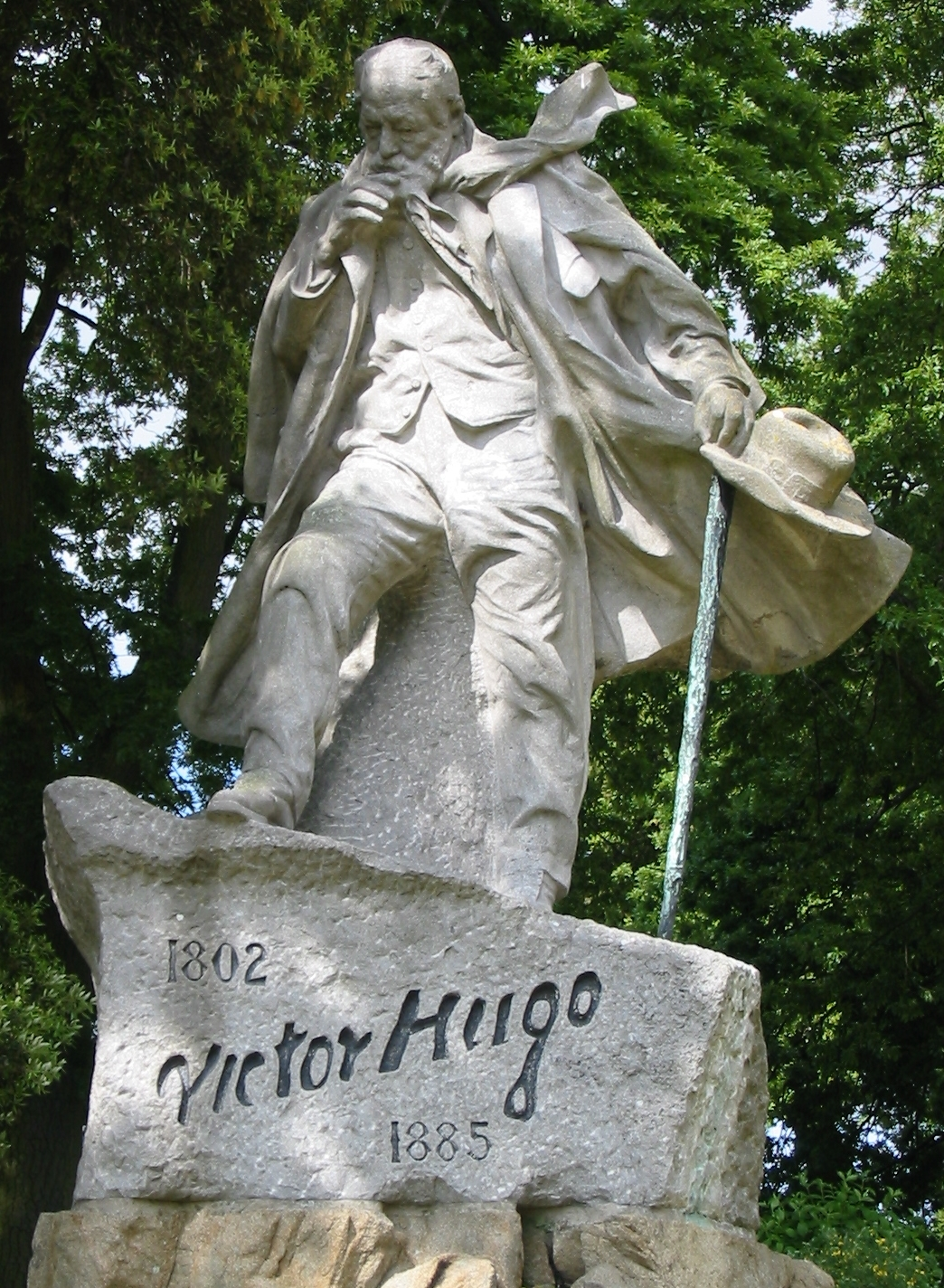
Victor Hugo statue in Candie Gardens

The Upper Gardens feature panoramic views over the islands of Herm and Sark. Two statues of note within the Upper Gardens are those of Queen Victoria and Victor Hugo. The statue of Victoria was erected in 1900 to mark her Diamond Jubilee; it was cast in bronze by C B Birch and is a replica of those in Aberdeen and the Thames Embankment, and was cast by the same foundry, Hollingshead & Burton of Thames Ditton. The statue of Hugo was erected in 1914, and was a gift of the French Government as thanks for the hospitality shown towards the writer during his exile on Guernsey. It was sculpted by Jean Boucher from stone, mounted on a limestone base, which, in turn, sits on a block of Jaonneuse granite.

The former Candie House is now the Priaulx Library. The Upper Gardens also feature the Guernsey Museum and an adjacent café, in the former bandstand. The museum was established in 1978, replacing the former Pavilion, at which The Beatles played on 18 August 1963. The Beatles performed two shows on the day, at 7pm and 9.15pm, were their only ones on the island, and were promoted by Baron Pontin.

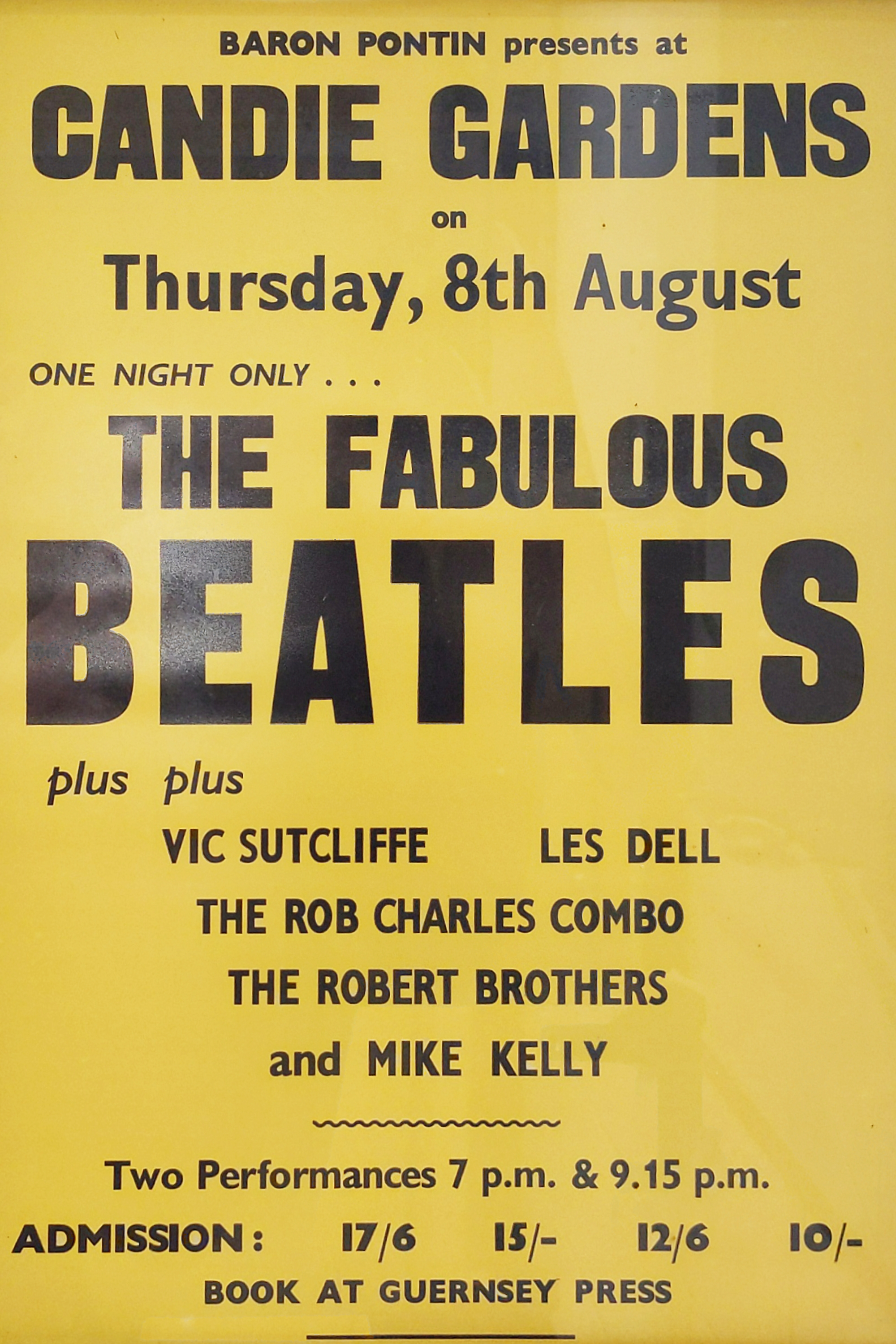
Poster advertising the Beatles playing a concert in Candie Gardens, Guernsey 18 August 1963

The Lower Gardens feature a rare surviving example of a Victorian Public Flower Garden, which was restored in 1998–99. There are also two surviving greenhouses in the Lower Gardens, both dating from 1792 and 1793.

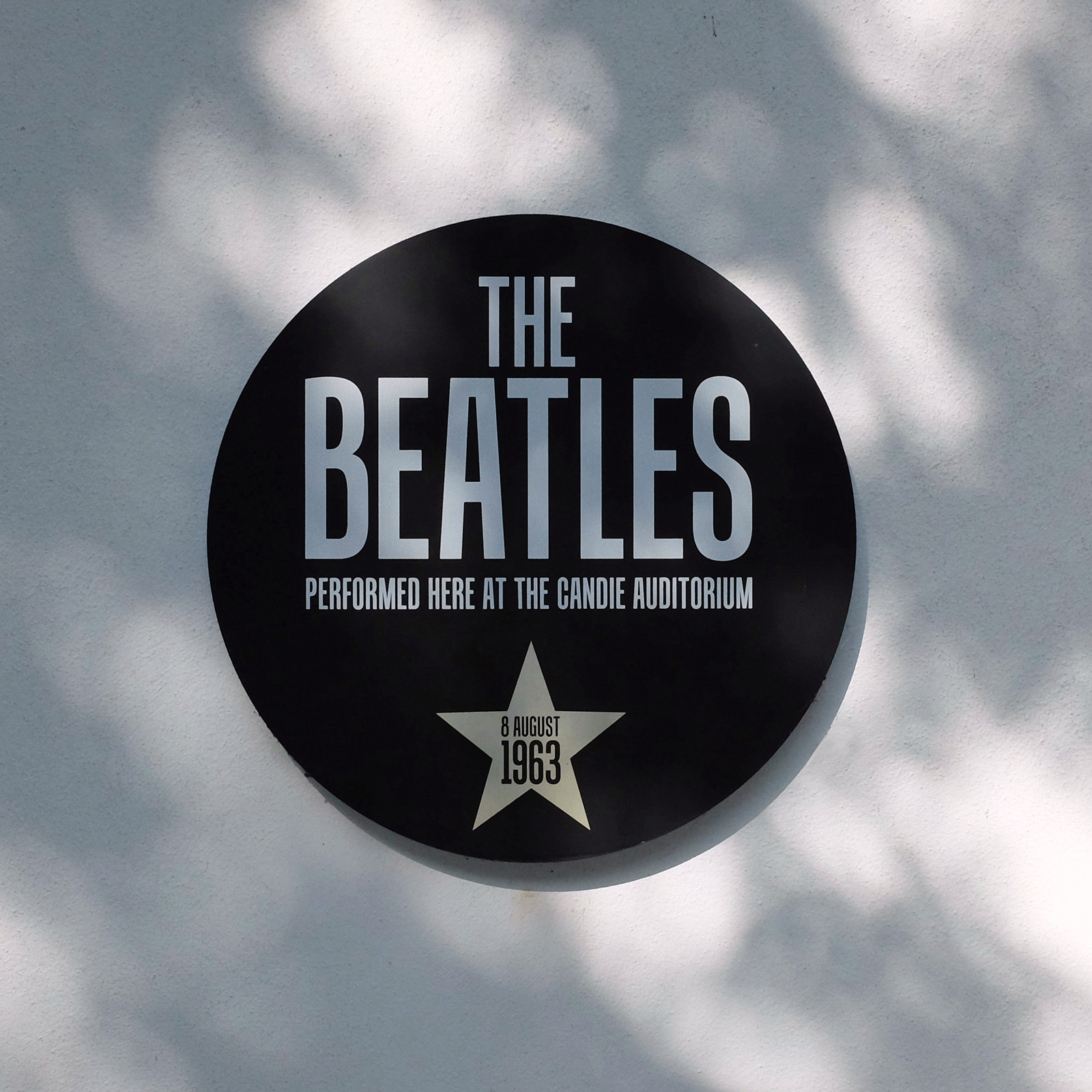
Plaque in Candie Gardens
