= When a Guitar Plays the Blues (Roy Lee Johnson album) =

Studio album by Roy Lee Johnson
- Released: August 18, 1998
- Genre: Blues
- Length: 54:33
- Label: Southern Tracks Records
- Producer: Roy Lee Johnson

Roy Lee Johnson chronology
All Night Long (1991)	When a Guitar Plays the Blues (1998)

Professional ratings
Review scores
Source	Rating
AllMusic	4.5/5 stars

When a Guitar Plays the Blues is a studio album by American singer and guitarist Roy Lee Johnson. It was released on August 18, 1998, by Southern Tracks Records.

== Track listing ==
All tracks are written by Roy Lee Johnson.

No.	Title	Length
1.	"When a Guitar Plays the Blues"	6:22
2.	"Red Hot"	2:56
3.	"Livin in Reverse"	5:42
4.	"Want to Be Touched by You"	2:51
5.	"I Thought About You"	4:31
6.	"Real Thang"	3:57
7.	"Who Do Me"	5:43
8.	"Hooks and Wheels"	4:43
9.	"You're the One"	3:26
10.	"Too Much Houch"	4:13
11.	"Tell Me Where She Went"	3:25
12.	"Mr. Moonlight"	3:22
13.	"Mr. Moonlight (instrumental)"	3:22

== Personnel ==
- Roy Lee Johnson – lead guitar and vocals
- Keith Samuels – bass guitar, electric and acoustic guitars and digital drums
- James Meadows – piano, strings and horns
- Larry Hall – electric and acoustic guitar
- Paul Linden – harmonica on "Too Much Hooch"
- Ron Harville – bass guitar

Technical staff

- Jeffery Alphabet – engineering, mixing
- Rodney Mills – mastering
