= Mark Lewisohn =

English author and historian (born 1958)

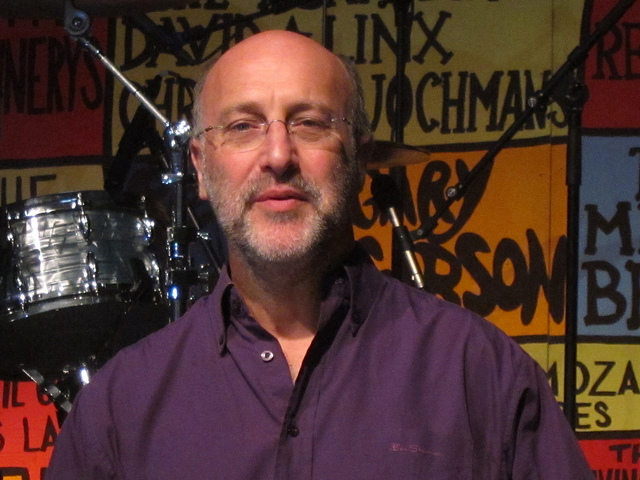
- Lewisohn in 2012
- Born: 16 June 1958 (age 68); London, England
- Occupations: Historian; biographer
- Writing career
- Years active: 1977−present
- Notable works: The Complete Beatles Recording Sessions; The Beatles: All These Years
- Website: marklewisohn.net

Mark Lewisohn (born 16 June 1958) is an English historian and biographer. Since the 1980s, he has written many reference books about the Beatles and has worked for EMI, MPL Communications and Apple Corps. He has been referred to as the world's leading authority on the band. His major works include The Complete Beatles Recording Sessions (1988), a history of the group's session dates, and The Beatles: All These Years (2013–present), a three-volume series intended as the group's most comprehensive biography.

== The Beatles and related subjects ==
=== Early books ===
Lewisohn has been writing about the Beatles since 1977, when he became a contributor to the fanzine Beatles Monthly. The fanzine commissioned him to answer fan letters after he won a quiz at the first London Beatles convention. When he began researching the band, he "found that it was a deep and rewarding history that was, for the most part, not very well researched by anybody else, so I just found a career by becoming a Beatles expert, I suppose you would say. Writing books and consulting on TV series, and ended up working for them. It's ridiculous. One thing just led to the next."

His 1986 book The Beatles Live! featured a complete history of all the Beatles' live performances, in a format which Lewisohn would follow for his subsequent books. After being invited by EMI to listen to all of the Beatles' original session tapes, Lewisohn wrote The Complete Beatles Recording Sessions (1988). The book was in the form of a diary, listing chronologically every recording session the Beatles had at Abbey Road Studios. It included details such as who played on each track and how many takes were recorded in each session. The book featured an introductory interview with Paul McCartney.

The Beatles: 25 Years in the Life (1988) included information on what each individual member of the band was doing on any particular day between 1962 and 1987. This book was republished as The Beatles Day by Day in 1990. The Complete Beatles Chronicle was published in 1992 and went one step further, detailing the band's entire career in the studio, on stage, and on radio, television, film and video.

Lewisohn's next book was The Beatles' London, which he co-authored with Piet Schreuders and Adam Smith, published in 1994. This is essentially a guide book to all the Beatles-related locations in London, including Abbey Road and the London Palladium, featuring maps and photographs of the band at the locations mentioned. A revised version of the book was published in early 2008.

=== Other contributions ===
As well as writing his own books, Lewisohn has written forewords to such books as Recording the Beatles by Brian Kehew and Kevin Ryan, Beatles Gear by Andy Babiuk and the German book Komm, gib mir deine Hand by Thorsten Knublauch and Axel Korinth. He has also contributed to In My Life: Lennon Remembered, a book to accompany the 10-part BBC radio series about John Lennon, and edited McCartney's book Wingspan, after working for a long time as editor and writer for McCartney's (now ceased) fanzine Club Sandwich. This led to him being invited by the former Beatle to write the liner notes for several of his albums, namely Flaming Pie, Band on the Run: 25th Anniversary Edition and Wingspan: Hits and History. He also wrote the liner notes for the retrospective six-CD box set Produced by George Martin – 50 Years in Recording, and the Beatles' albums 1 and The Capitol Albums, Volume 1. He was heavily involved in The Beatles Anthology project.

According to Daniel Finkelstein, writing in The Times in 2014, Lewisohn was responsible for identifying comedian Jasper Carrott as the source in 1983 of the famous remark, "Ringo isn't the best drummer in the world. He isn't even the best drummer in the Beatles." Though the observation had been attributed to John Lennon, Lewisohn had been doubtful because he could find no record of his having said it and thought it was out of character for Lennon to say something that he did not actually believe, though he was also well known for making mischievous remarks. However Lewisohn eventually confirmed that the line actually originated in a 1981 episode of the BBC Radio 4 comedy series Radio Active, with the joke itself written by Geoffrey Perkins. Though Lewisohn also claimed that the person who said the line was Philip Pope, further investigation by Beatles fan Andrew Dixon in 2022 also found that it was in fact Michael Fenton Stevens.

=== The Beatles: All These Years ===
In 2005, Lewisohn announced that he had started work on a three-volume Beatles biography. He was quoted as saying of the work:

The Beatles story has been told very often but, in my view, rarely very well. I'm writing a wide-ranging history and my aim is true: to explore and comprehend what happened in and around the Beatles, and to write it even-handedly, without fear or favour, bias or agenda. A rock and roll group came out of Liverpool and shaped the last half of the 20th century the world over, and their music transcends changing times. The whole extraordinary story needs to be fully recorded and it needs to be done now, while first-hand witnesses are still with us.

Volume 1 was published in October 2013, entitled The Beatles: All These Years, Volume One – Tune In. Lewisohn was quoted as saying "It took longer to research and write than I could ever have anticipated". In an interview published on 28 December 2013, Lewisohn estimated that the second volume would be published in 2020 and the final volume in 2028 ("about the time he turns 70"). However, in August 2018 Lewisohn tweeted that it was "way too early to say" when he would be able to publish Volume 2.

In autumn 2019 Lewisohn toured a one-man show, Hornsey Road, around theatres in England, also stopping at Dublin and Edinburgh. The 25-date tour was an multimedia history lecture about the Beatles' last-made album, Abbey Road. The tour title referred to EMI's 1956–57 purchase of a recording studio in Holloway, north London, where the Beatles would have recorded had EMI not altered its course and decided to keep all company recording at the existing studio on Abbey Road. The revenue from the tour, which sold out several of its venues, helped fund Lewisohn's work on the remaining volumes of The Beatles: All These Years.

=== Evolver:62 ===
In autumn 2022, Mark Lewisohn presented a stage show that played at Bloomsbury Theatre (London), a history lecture on the Beatles, over two hours long. A documentary based on the show, including on-location footage from Liverpool and London, was released in 2025.

== Other work ==
Although the Beatles are Lewisohn's area of particular expertise, he has also written on a variety of other subjects. One of his best-known works is an encyclopaedia of comedy on British television screens titled Radio Times Guide to TV Comedy, published in 1998 and updated in 2003, also available online as the BBC Guide to Comedy until 2007.

He has also written Funny, Peculiar, a biography of Benny Hill, published in 2002.

In the past, Lewisohn has written for magazines, including the Radio Times and Match of the Day. He also helped to edit the book Hendrix: Setting The Record Straight, written by John McDermott and Eddie Kramer.

== Personal life ==
Lewisohn is married to Anita Epstein. He has two sons from a previous marriage to Tarja Matikainen. Lewisohn is Jewish.

== Bibliography ==
- The Beatles Live! (1986)
- The Beatles: 25 Years in the Life (1987)
- The Complete Beatles Recording Sessions (1988)
- The Complete Beatles Chronicle (1992)
- Radio Times Guide to TV Comedy (1998)
- Funny, Peculiar: The True Story of Benny Hill (2002)
- Radio Times Guide to TV Comedy (2nd edition, 2003)
- The Beatles: All These Years

- Volume One – Tune In (2013)

- The Beatles A Hard Day's Night: A Private Archive (2016)
- An Englishman in Mons (2017)

=== As coauthor ===
- In My Life: John Lennon Remembered (1990, with Kevin Howlett)
- The Beatles' London (1994, with Piet Schreuders and Adam Smith)
- The Beatles' London (2nd edition, 2008, with Piet Schreuders and Adam Smith)

=== As editor ===
- Wingspan: Paul McCartney's Band on the Run (2002)

== Filmography ==
- Evolver 62 (2026), dir. Chris Purcell
