= Tim Riley (music critic) =

American music critic

- Born: Tim Riley; 1960 (age 65–66)
- Occupations: Music critic; historian; biographer

Tim Riley (born 1960) is a music journalist who reviews pop and classical music for NPR, and contributes regularly to the Los Angeles Review of Books. His byline has also appeared in The New York Times, truthdig, the Huffington Post, the Washington Post, Slate and Salon. Since 2023 he has published the free bi-weekly riley rock report on substack.com. He was recently featured for an hour on Jack Coyne's Track Star, March 2026.

== Career ==
His first book was Tell Me Why: A Beatles Commentary (Knopf/Vintage 1988), a critique of the Beatles' music, which The New York Times said brought "new insight to the act we've known for all these years".

His television appearances include Morning Joe, and PBS NewsHour.

Since 2009, he has taught digital journalism at Emerson College in Boston. Brown University sponsored Riley as its critic-in-residence in 2008. Riley gave a keynote address at Beatles 2000, the first international academic conference in Jyväskylä, Finland. Since then, he has given lectures on censorship in the arts and rock history. His subsequent projects include the music metaportal Riley Rock Index and a biography of John Lennon (Hyperion, 2011), which was included in Kirkus Reviews' list of the Best Nonfiction of 2011.

== Books ==
- Tell Me Why: A Beatles Commentary (1988), ISBN 978-0394550619
- Hard Rain: A Dylan Commentary (1992), ISBN 978-0394578897
- Madonna Illustrated (1992), ISBN 978-1562829834
- Fever: How Rock 'n' Roll Transformed Gender in America (2004), ISBN 978-0312286118
- Lennon: The Man, the Myth, the Music - The Definitive Life (2011), ISBN 978-1401324520
- What Goes On: The Beatles, Their Music, and Their Time (Walter Everett and Tim Riley, 2019), ISBN 978-0190949877
