= Ruby Lee =

Ruby Lee may refer to:

== People ==
- Ruby B. Lee, electrical engineer at Princeton University
- Ruby Stephens (1924–1996), baseball pitcher

== Music ==
- "Ruby Lee", a bonus track on the CD re-release of the 1956 B.B. King blues album Singin' the Blues
- "Ruby Lee", a track on the 1974 Bill Withers soul/funk album +'Justments
- "Ruby Lee", a track on the 1982 Joe Cocker album Sheffield Steel, the 1995 compilation The Long Voyage Home and the 2003 album The Ultimate Collection 1968–2003 (live version)

== Botany ==
- Vriesea 'Ruby Lee', a cultivar of the Vriesea ensiformis or Vriesea erythrodactylon bromeliads
- Nidularium 'Ruby Lee', a cultivar of the Nidularium innocentii var. lineatum bromeliads

== Other ==
- Ruby Lee Mill Site, in Joshua Tree National Park
- Ruby Lee Gissing, the title character of the 1993 film Ruby in Paradise
- Ruby Lee, a German show jumping horse in the 2010 FEI Nations Cup Promotional League
