= Nidularium apiculatum var. serrulatum =

Scientific classification
- Kingdom: Plantae
- Clade: Tracheophytes
- Clade: Angiosperms
- Clade: Monocots
- Clade: Commelinids
- Order: Poales
- Family: Bromeliaceae
- Genus: Nidularium
- Species: N. apiculatum
- Variety: N. a. var. serrulatum

Trinomial name
- Nidularium apiculatum var. serrulatum L.B.Sm.

Variety of flowering plant

Nidularium apiculatum var. serrulatum is a plant in the genus Nidularium. This plant is endemic to Brazil.
