= Nidularium innocentii var. striatum =

Scientific classification
- Kingdom: Plantae
- Clade: Tracheophytes
- Clade: Angiosperms
- Clade: Monocots
- Clade: Commelinids
- Order: Poales
- Family: Bromeliaceae
- Genus: Nidularium
- Species: N. innocentii
- Variety: N. i. var. striatum

Trinomial name
- Nidularium innocentii var. striatum (W.Bull) Wittmack

Variety of flowering plant

Nidularium innocentii var. striatum is a plant in the genus Nidularium. This plant is endemic to Brazil.

== Cultivars ==
- Nidularium 'Francois Spae'
