= Nidularium campos-portoi var. robustum =

Scientific classification
- Kingdom: Plantae
- Clade: Tracheophytes
- Clade: Angiosperms
- Clade: Monocots
- Clade: Commelinids
- Order: Poales
- Family: Bromeliaceae
- Genus: Nidularium
- Species: N. campos-portoi
- Variety: N. c. var. robustum

Trinomial name
- Nidularium campos-portoi var. robustum (E.Pereira & I.A.Penna) Leme

Variety of flowering plant

Nidularium campos-portoi var. robustum is a plant in the genus Nidularium. This plant is endemic to Brazil.
