= Vriesea warmingii =

Scientific classification
- Kingdom: Plantae
- Clade: Tracheophytes
- Clade: Angiosperms
- Clade: Monocots
- Clade: Commelinids
- Order: Poales
- Family: Bromeliaceae
- Genus: Vriesea
- Species: V. warmingii

Binomial name
- Vriesea warmingii É.Morren

Synonyms
- Tillandsia warmingii (É.Morren) Baker; Vriesea ensiformis var. warmingii É.Morren

Species of flowering plant

Vriesea warmingii is a species of flowering plant in the family Bromeliaceae, endemic to Brazil. As of November 2022, the species was accepted by the Encyclopaedia of Bromeliads, but regarded as a synonym of Vriesea ensiformis by Plants of the World Online.
