= Nidularium antoineanum =

Scientific classification
- Kingdom: Plantae
- Clade: Tracheophytes
- Clade: Angiosperms
- Clade: Monocots
- Clade: Commelinids
- Order: Poales
- Family: Bromeliaceae
- Genus: Nidularium
- Species: N. antoineanum

Binomial name
- Nidularium antoineanum Wawra

Synonyms
- Karatas antoineana (Wawra) Baker; Nidularium antoineanum var. angustifolium Wawra; Nidularium pedicellatum E.Pereira & Leme

Species of flowering plant

Nidularium antoineanum is a plant species in the genus Nidularium. This species is endemic to Brazil.

== Cultivars ==
- Nidularium 'Antoiniana'
- × Niduregelia 'Anson'
