= Nidularium campo-alegrense =

Scientific classification
- Kingdom: Plantae
- Clade: Tracheophytes
- Clade: Angiosperms
- Clade: Monocots
- Clade: Commelinids
- Order: Poales
- Family: Bromeliaceae
- Genus: Nidularium
- Species: N. campo-alegrense

Binomial name
- Nidularium campo-alegrense Leme

Species of flowering plant

Nidularium campo-alegrense is a plant species in the genus Nidularium. This species is endemic to Brazil.
