= Nidularium minutum =

Scientific classification
- Kingdom: Plantae
- Clade: Embryophytes
- Clade: Tracheophytes
- Clade: Spermatophytes
- Clade: Angiosperms
- Clade: Monocots
- Clade: Commelinids
- Order: Poales
- Family: Bromeliaceae
- Genus: Nidularium
- Species: N. minutum

Binomial name
- Nidularium minutum Mez

Synonyms
- Homotypic Synonyms: Canistrum minutum (Mez) L.B.Sm.; Wittrockia minuta (Mez) L.B.Sm.

Species of flowering plant

Nidularium minutum is a species of flowering plant in the family Bromeliaceae.

This species is endemic to Brazil.
