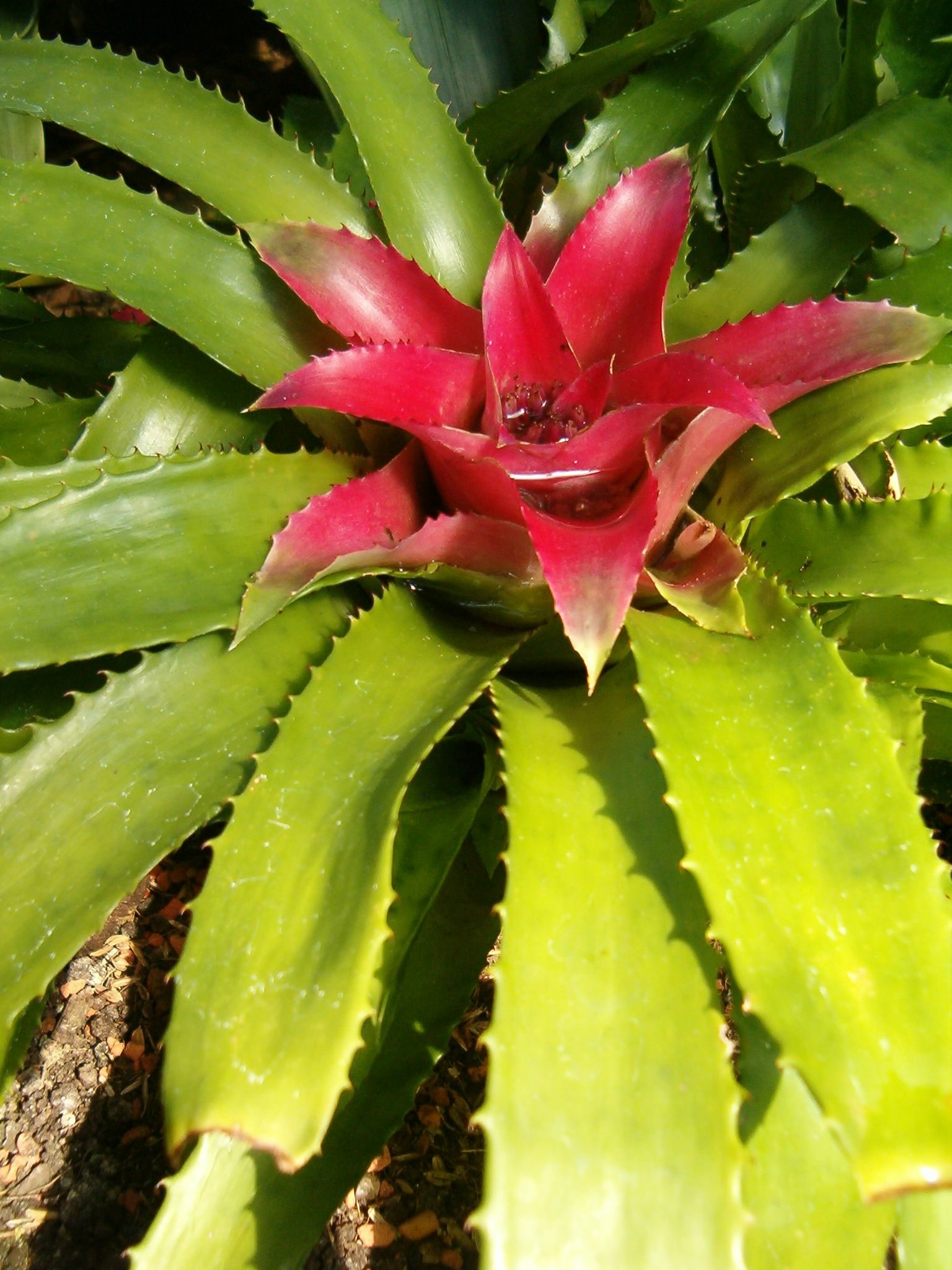
- Nidularium fulgens in bloom

Scientific classification
- Kingdom: Plantae
- Clade: Embryophytes
- Clade: Tracheophytes
- Clade: Angiosperms
- Clade: Monocots
- Clade: Commelinids
- Order: Poales
- Family: Bromeliaceae
- Subfamily: Bromelioideae
- Genus: Nidularium; Lem.

Synonyms
- Aregelia Kuntze; Gemellaria Pinel ex Lem.; Canistropsis (Mez) Lem.

= Nidularium =

Genus of flowering plants

Nidularium is a genus in the plant family Bromeliaceae, subfamily Bromelioideae. Named to describe the nestling characteristic of the inflorescence (Lat. nidulus = little nest), all the species are endemic to Brazil. Commonly confused with Neoregelia which they resemble, this plant group was first described in 1854.

== Species ==
- Nidularium albiflorum (L.B. Smith) Leme
- Nidularium altimontanum Leme
- Nidularium alvimii W. Weber
- Nidularium amazonicum (Baker) Linden & E. Morren ex Lindman
- Nidularium amorimii Leme
- Nidularium angustibracteatum Leme
- Nidularium angustifolium Ule
- Nidularium antoineanum Wawra
- Nidularium apiculatum L.B. Smith
  - var. serrulatum L.B. Smith
- Nidularium atalaiaense E. Pereira & Leme
- Nidularium azureum (L.B. Smith) Leme
- Nidularium bicolor (E. Pereira) Leme
- Nidularium bocainense Leme
- Nidularium campo-alegrense Leme
- Nidularium campos-portoi (L.B. Smith) Wanderley & B.A. Moreira
  - var. robustum (E. Pereira & I.A. Penna) Leme
- Nidularium cariacicaense (W. Weber) Leme
- Nidularium catarinense Leme
- Nidularium corallinum (Leme) Leme
- Nidularium espiritosantense Leme
- Nidularium ferdinando-coburgii Wawra
- Nidularium ferrugineum Leme
- Nidularium fradense Leme
- Nidularium fulgens Lemaire
- Nidularium innocentii Lemaire
  - var. lineatum (Mez) L.B. Smith
  - var. striatum (W. Bull) Wittmack
- Nidularium itatiaiae L.B. Smith
- Nidularium jonesianum Leme
- Nidularium kautskyanum Leme
- Nidularium krisgreeniae Leme
- Nidularium linehamii Leme
- Nidularium longiflorum Ule
- Nidularium mangaratibense Leme
- Nidularium marigoi Leme
- Nidularium meeanum Leme, Wanderley & Mollo
- Nidularium minutum Mez
- Nidularium organense Leme
- Nidularium picinguabense Leme
- Nidularium procerum Lindman
- Nidularium purpureum Beer
- Nidularium rosulatum Ule
- Nidularium rubens Mez
- Nidularium rutilans E. Morren
- Nidularium scheremetiewii Regel
- Nidularium serratum Leme
- Nidularium utriculosum Ule
- Nidularium viridipetalum Leme

== Gallery ==
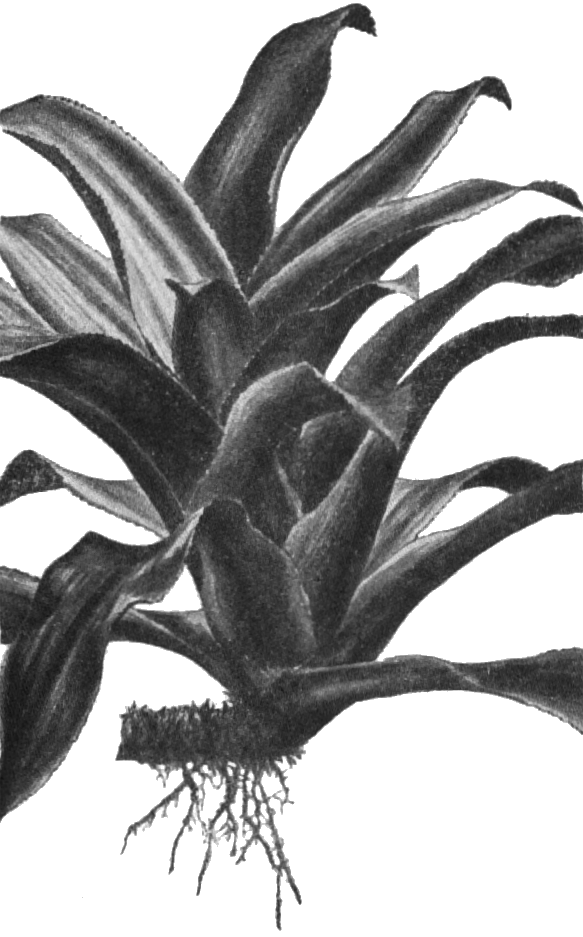
Nidularium innocentii

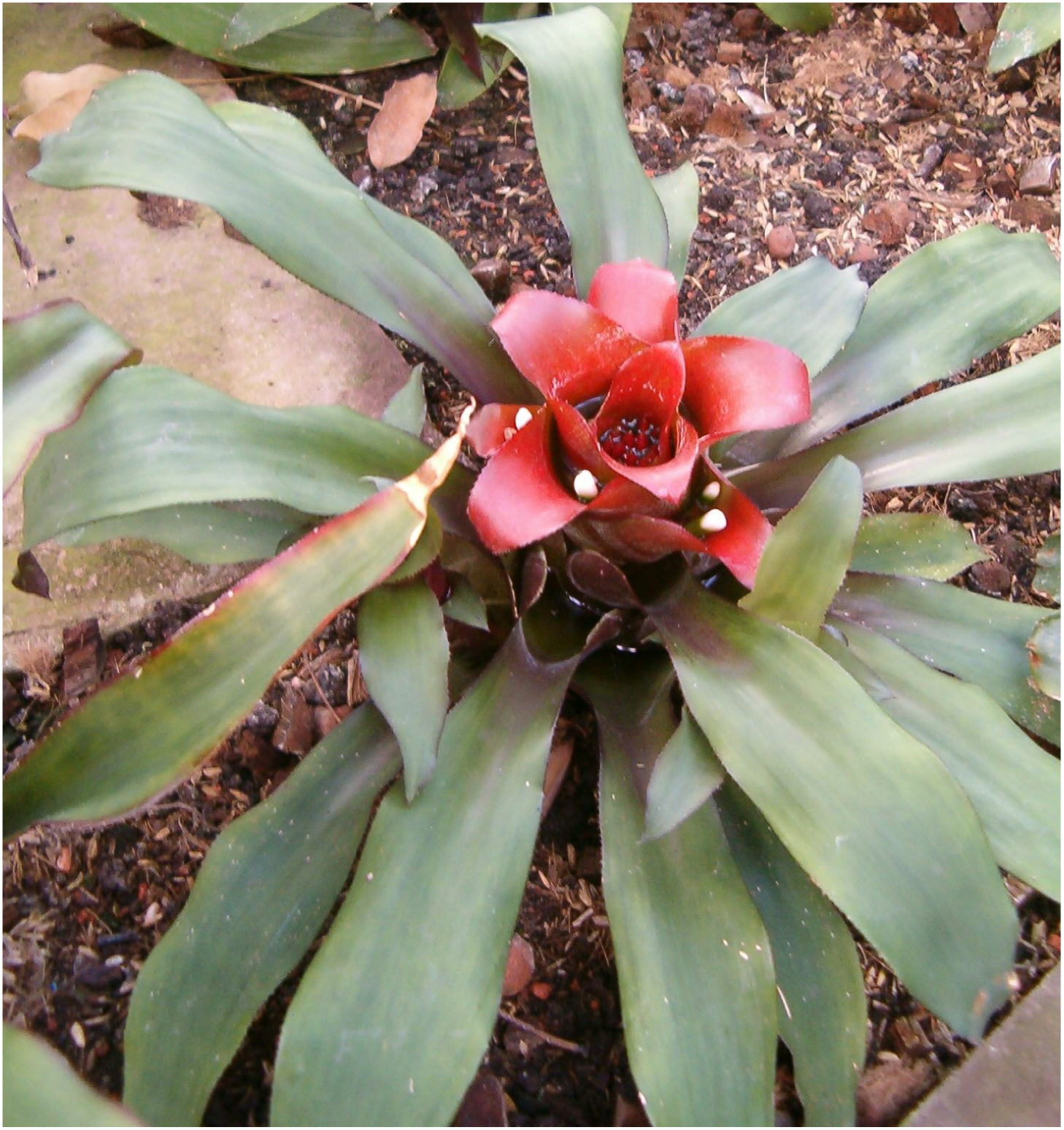
Nidularium innocentii innocentii

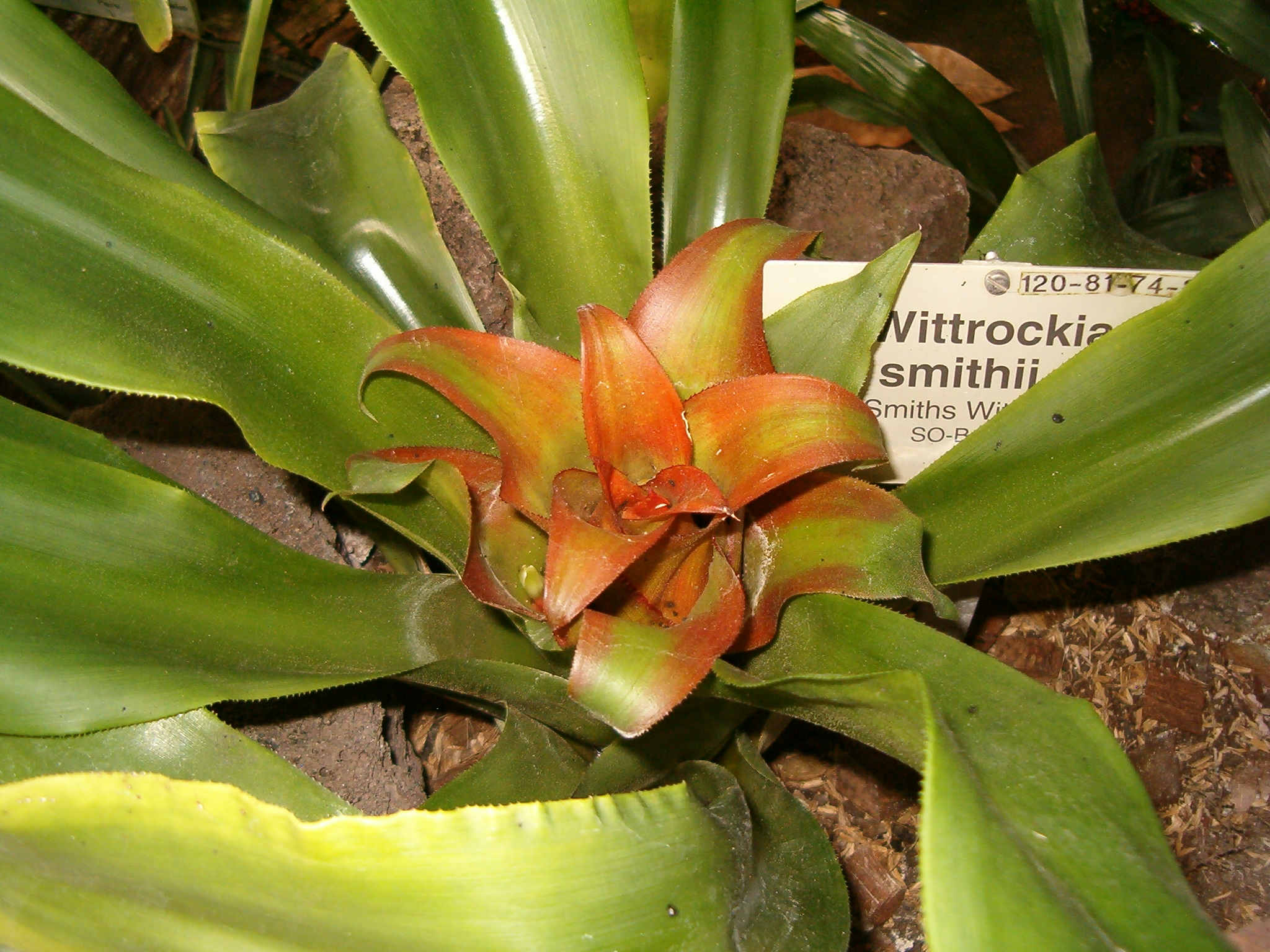
Nidularium amazonicum
