= Nidularium rubens =

Scientific classification
- Kingdom: Plantae
- Clade: Embryophytes
- Clade: Tracheophytes
- Clade: Spermatophytes
- Clade: Angiosperms
- Clade: Monocots
- Clade: Commelinids
- Order: Poales
- Family: Bromeliaceae
- Genus: Nidularium
- Species: N. rubens

Binomial name
- Nidularium rubens Mez

Species of flowering plant

Nidularium rubens is a species of flowering plant in the family Bromeliaceae. This species is endemic to Brazil.
