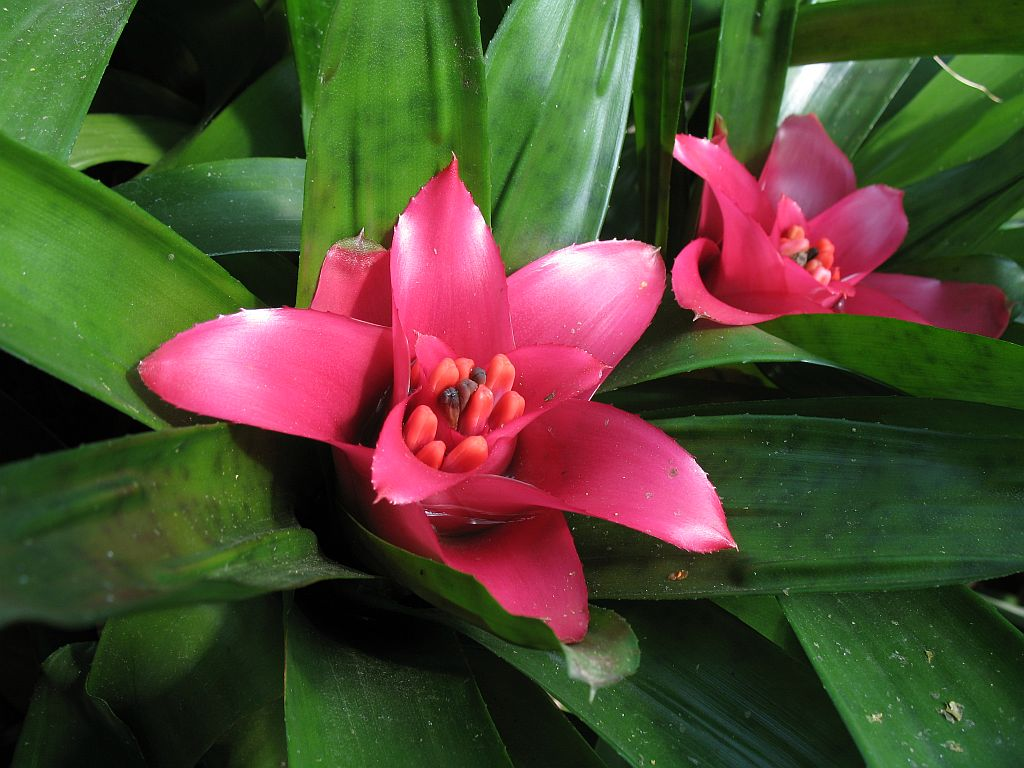

Scientific classification
- Kingdom: Plantae
- Clade: Tracheophytes
- Clade: Angiosperms
- Clade: Monocots
- Clade: Commelinids
- Order: Poales
- Family: Bromeliaceae
- Genus: Nidularium
- Species: N. rutilans

Binomial name
- Nidularium rutilans E. Morren

= Nidularium rutilans =

Species of flowering plant

Nidularium rutilans is a plant species in the genus Nidularium. This species is endemic to Brazil.

== Cultivars ==
- Nidularium 'Eureka'
- Nidularium 'Flamingo'
- Nidularium 'Leprosa'
- Nidularium 'Regal Lady'
- Nidularium 'Rusty'
- Nidularium 'Sao Paulo'
- × Niduregelia 'Heart Afire'
- × Niduregelia 'Souvenir De Casimir Morobe'
