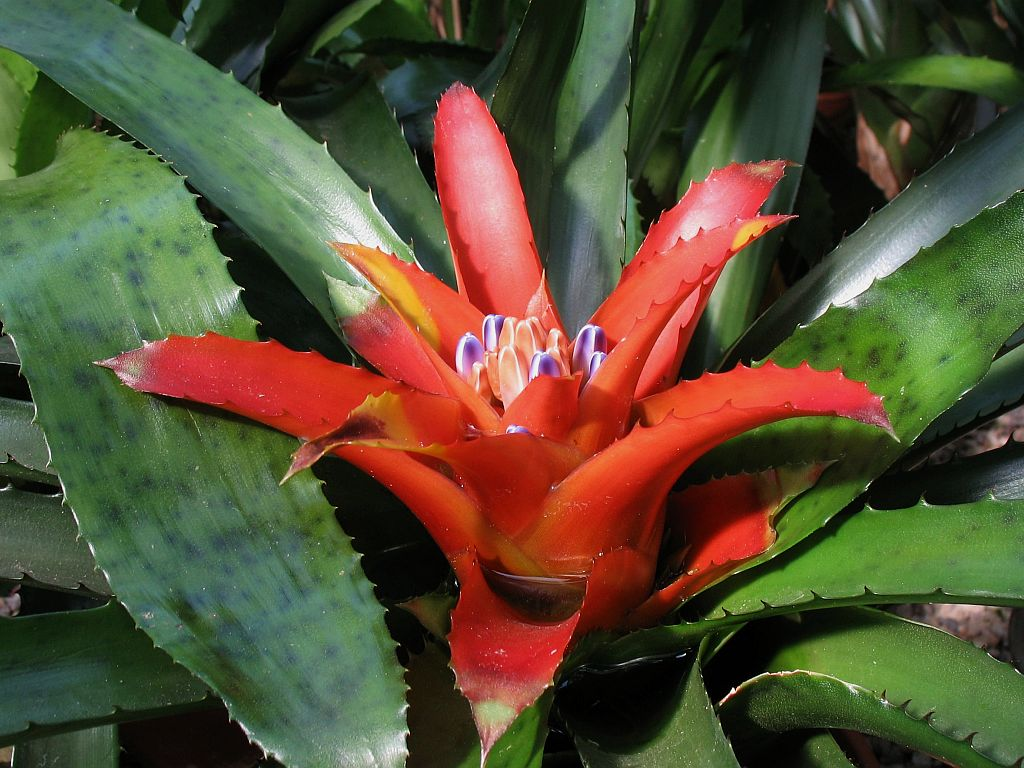
- Nidularium fulgens

Scientific classification
- Kingdom: Plantae
- Clade: Tracheophytes
- Clade: Angiosperms
- Clade: Monocots
- Clade: Commelinids
- Order: Poales
- Family: Bromeliaceae
- Genus: Nidularium
- Species: N. fulgens

Binomial name
- Nidularium fulgens Lemaire

= Nidularium fulgens =

Species of flowering plant

Nidularium fulgens is a plant species in the genus Nidularium. This species is endemic to Brazil.

== Cultivars ==
- Nidularium 'Chantrieri'
- Nidularium 'Digeneum'
- Nidularium 'Francois Spae'
- Nidularium 'Madame Robert Morobe'
- Nidularium 'Orange Bract'
- × Nidumea 'Margaret J'
- × Niduregelia 'Ch. Chevalier'
- × Niduregelia 'Garnet'
- × Niduregelia 'Golden Vulkan'
- × Niduregelia 'Marechalii'
- × Niduregelia 'Something Special'
- × Niduregelia 'Southern Cross'
- × Niduregelia 'Sunset'
- × Niduregelia 'Thor'
