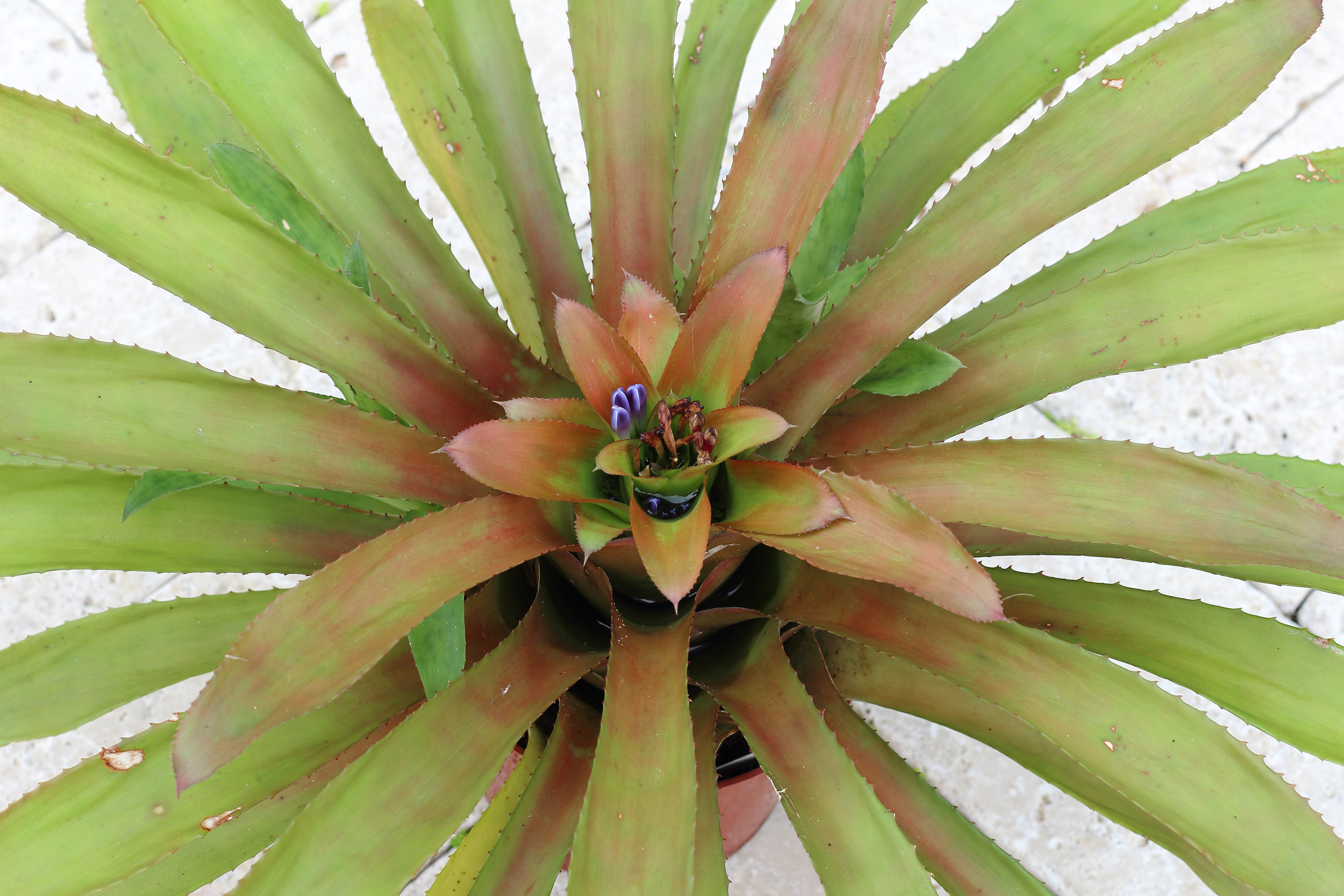

Scientific classification
- Kingdom: Plantae
- Clade: Tracheophytes
- Clade: Angiosperms
- Clade: Monocots
- Clade: Commelinids
- Order: Poales
- Family: Bromeliaceae
- Genus: Nidularium
- Species: N. atalaiaense

Binomial name
- Nidularium atalaiaense E. Pereira & Leme

= Nidularium atalaiaense =

Species of flowering plant

Nidularium atalaiaense is a plant species in the genus Nidularium. This species is endemic to Brazil.
