= Ultimate Collection (Joe Cocker album) =

Compilation album by Joe Cocker
- Released: 13 January 2004
- Recorded: 1969–2000
- Genre: Rock
- Label: Hip-O

Joe Cocker chronology
The Ultimate Collection 1968-2003 (2003)	Ultimate Collection (2004)	Heart & Soul (2004)

Professional ratings
Review scores
Source	Rating
AllMusic	3.5/5 stars

Ultimate Collection is a compilation album by English singer Joe Cocker, released in 2004.

== Track listing ==
1. "With a Little Help from My Friends" - 5:12
2. "Feelin' Alright" - 4:12
3. "Delta Lady" - 2:51
4. "She Came In Through the Bathroom Window" - 2:37
5. "The Letter" (live) - 4:17
6. "Cry Me a River" (live) - 3:57
7. "You Are So Beautiful" - 2:43
8. "I'm So Glad I'm Standing Here Today" - 5:00 (with The Crusaders)
9. "Sweet Little Woman" - 4:01
10. "Many Rivers to Cross" - 3:43
11. "Up Where We Belong" - 3:52 (with Jennifer Warnes)
12. "Shelter Me" - 4:21
13. "You Can Leave Your Hat On" - 4:13
14. "Unchain My Heart" - 5:06
15. "When the Night Comes" - 3:57
16. "Now That the Magic Has Gone" - 4:38
17. "Summer in the City" - 3:52
18. "Have a Little Faith in Me" - 4:39
19. "Sail Away" - 3:00
20. "First We Take Manhattan" - 3:40
- Tracks 1, 2 taken from With a Little Help from My Friends, A&M Records SP-3106, released May 1969.
- Tracks 3, 4 taken from Joe Cocker!, A&M Records SP-4224, released November 1969.
- Tracks 5, 6 taken from Mad Dogs & Englishmen, A&M Records SP-6002, released September 1970.
- Track 7 taken from I Can Stand a Little Rain, A&M Records SP-3175, released August 1974.
- Track 8 taken from Standing Tall (The Crusaders album), MCA Records MCA-5254, released October 1981.
- Tracks 9, 10 taken from Sheffield Steel, Island Records, IL 9750, released July 1982.
- Track 11 taken from An Officer and a Gentleman soundtrack, Island Records 90017, released November 1982.
- Tracks 12, 13 taken from Cocker, Capitol Records, released March 1986.
- Track 14 taken from The Best of Joe Cocker, Capitol Records, released October 1992.
- Track 15 taken from One Night of Sin, Capitol Records, released August 1989.
- Track 16 taken from Night Calls, Capitol Records, released October 1991.
- Tracks 17, 18 taken from Have a Little Faith, Sony BMG Music, released September 1994.
- Track 19 taken from Organic, Sony BMG Music, released October 1996.
- Track 20 taken from No Ordinary World, Eagle Records, released August 2000.
