= Nidularium scheremetiewii =

Scientific classification
- Kingdom: Plantae
- Clade: Tracheophytes
- Clade: Angiosperms
- Clade: Monocots
- Clade: Commelinids
- Order: Poales
- Family: Bromeliaceae
- Genus: Nidularium
- Species: N. scheremetiewii

Binomial name
- Nidularium scheremetiewii Regel

Species of flowering plant

Nidularium scheremetiewii is a species of bromeliad in the genus Nidularium.

This species is endemic to the Atlantic Forest ecoregion only within Rio de Janeiro state, in southeastern Brazil.
