= Nidularium angustifolium =

Scientific classification
- Kingdom: Plantae
- Clade: Tracheophytes
- Clade: Angiosperms
- Clade: Monocots
- Clade: Commelinids
- Order: Poales
- Family: Bromeliaceae
- Genus: Nidularium
- Species: N. angustifolium

Binomial name
- Nidularium angustifolium Ule

Species of flowering plant

Nidularium angustifolium is a plant species in the genus Nidularium. This species is endemic to Brazil.
