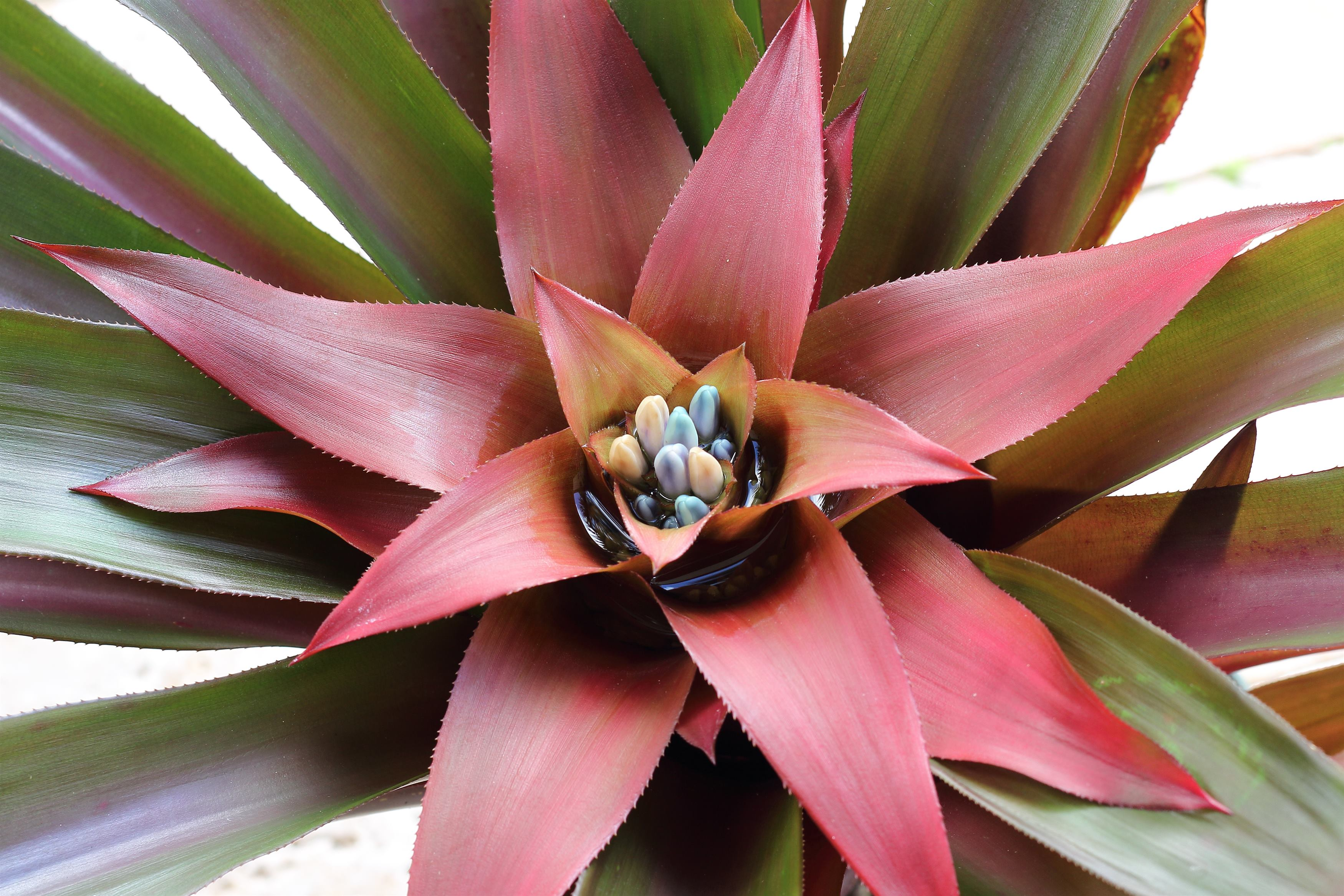

Scientific classification
- Kingdom: Plantae
- Clade: Tracheophytes
- Clade: Angiosperms
- Clade: Monocots
- Clade: Commelinids
- Order: Poales
- Family: Bromeliaceae
- Genus: Nidularium
- Species: N. procerum

Binomial name
- Nidularium procerum Lindm.

Synonyms
- List: Aechmea purpurea Baker; Nidularium porphyreum Mez; Canistrum purpureum É.Morren; Karatas cardinalis Mez; Nidularium affine Mez; Nidularium gracile Tardivo; Nidularium insulare E.Pereira & Leme; Nidularium kermesianum F.J.Müll. ex Mez; Nidularium meeanum Leme, Wand. & Mollo; Nidularium procerum var. kermesianum (F.J.Müll. ex Mez) Reitz; Nidularium terminale Ule; Nidularium uleanum Stellfeld

= Nidularium procerum =

Species of flowering plant

Nidularium procerum is a species of flowering plant in the family Bromeliaceae. This bromeliad is endemic to the Atlantic Forest ecoregion of southeastern Brazil.

== Cultivars ==
- Nidularium 'Odd Ball'
- Nidularium 'Stripes'
- × Nidbergia 'Chas Hodgson'
- × Niduregelia 'Joker'
