= Nidularium innocentii var. lineatum =

Scientific classification
- Kingdom: Plantae
- Clade: Tracheophytes
- Clade: Angiosperms
- Clade: Monocots
- Clade: Commelinids
- Order: Poales
- Family: Bromeliaceae
- Genus: Nidularium
- Species: N. innocentii
- Variety: N. i. var. lineatum

Trinomial name
- Nidularium innocentii var. lineatum (Mez) L.B.Sm.

Variety of flowering plant

Nidularium innocentii var. lineatum is a plant in the genus Nidularium. This plant is endemic to Brazil.

== Cultivars ==
- Nidularium 'Don Roberts'
- Nidularium 'Flamingo'
- Nidularium 'Ruby Lee'
- Nidularium 'Something Special'
