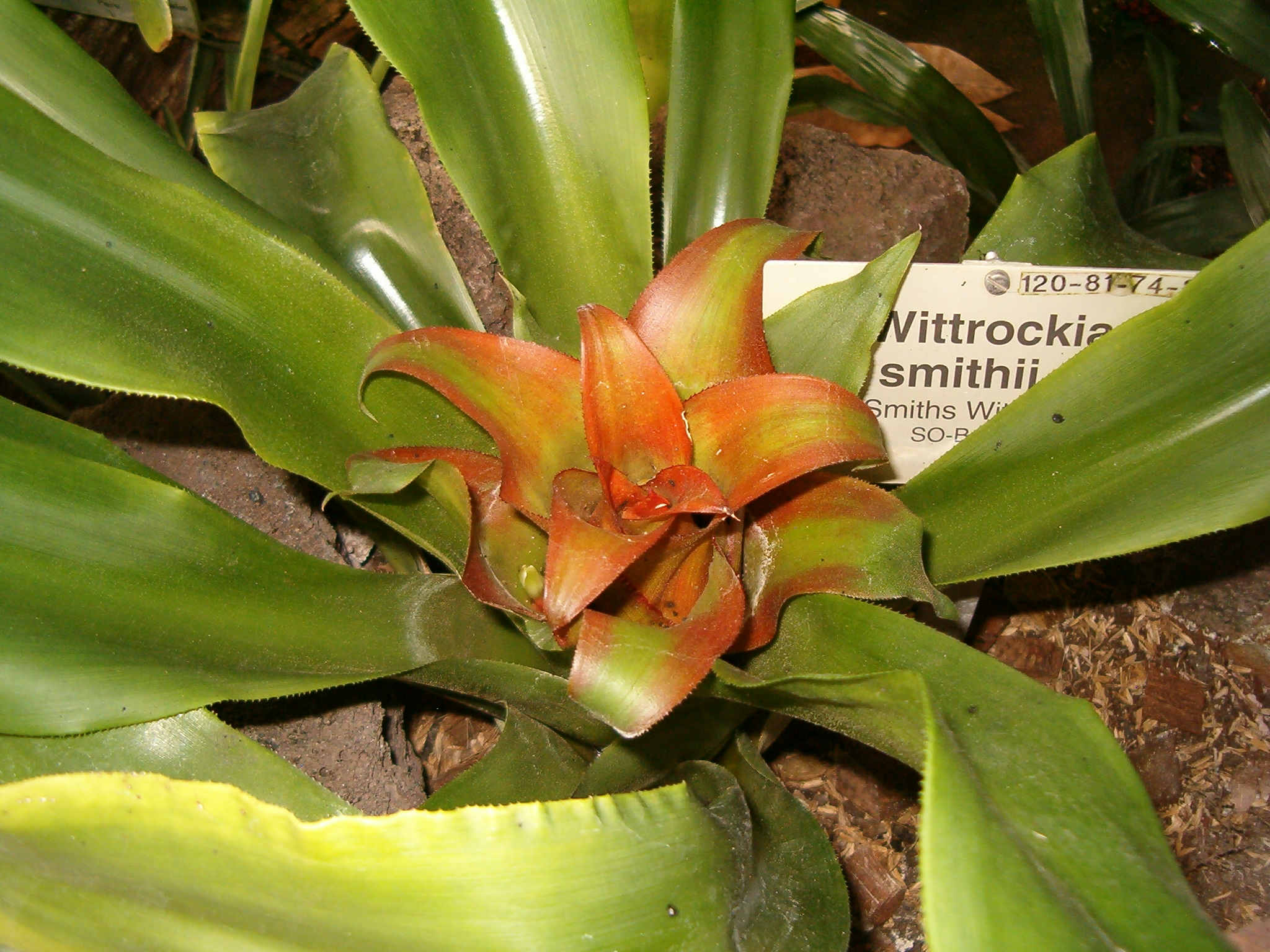

Scientific classification
- Kingdom: Plantae
- Clade: Tracheophytes
- Clade: Angiosperms
- Clade: Monocots
- Clade: Commelinids
- Order: Poales
- Family: Bromeliaceae
- Genus: Nidularium
- Species: N. amazonicum

Binomial name
- Nidularium amazonicum (Baker) Linden & E.Morren ex Lindm.

Synonyms
- Canistrum amazonicum (Baker) Mez; Karatas amazonica Baker; Wittrockia amazonica (Baker) L.B.Sm. Wittrockia smithii Reitz

= Nidularium amazonicum =

Species of plant

Nidularium amazonicum is a species of flowering plant in the Bromeliaceae family. It is endemic to Brazil.

== Cultivars ==
- Nidularium 'Cherry Road'
