= Nidularium itatiaiae =

Scientific classification
- Kingdom: Plantae
- Clade: Tracheophytes
- Clade: Angiosperms
- Clade: Monocots
- Clade: Commelinids
- Order: Poales
- Family: Bromeliaceae
- Genus: Nidularium
- Species: N. itatiaiae

Binomial name
- Nidularium itatiaiae L.B.Sm.

Species of flowering plant

Nidularium itatiaiae is a plant species in the genus Nidularium. This species is endemic to Brazil.
