= The Ultimate Collection 1968–2003 =

The Ultimate Collection 1968-2003

Compilation album by Joe Cocker
- Released: 9 December 2003
- Genre: Rock
- Length: 129.30
- Label: EMI

Joe Cocker chronology
| Greatest Love Songs (2003) | The Ultimate Collection 1968-2003 (2003) | Ultimate Collection (2004) |

Professional ratings
Review scores
| Source | Rating |
|---|---|
| AllMusic | 4/5 stars |

The Ultimate Collection 1968–2003 is a compilation album by English singer Joe Cocker, released in 2003 (see 2003 in music).

== Track listing ==
=== Disc 1 ===
1. "Unchain My Heart" - 5:04
2. "Feelin' Alright" - 4:11
3. "Summer in the City" - 3:50
4. "You Can Leave Your Hat On" - 4:14
5. "Up Where We Belong" - 3:56
6. "You Are So Beautiful" - 2:42
7. "With a Little Help from My Friends" - 5:11
8. "Cry Me a River" (live) - 4:00
9. "The Letter" (live) - 4:25
10. "Delta Lady" - 2:51
11. "Many Rivers to Cross" - 3:46
12. "When the Night Comes" - 4:46
13. "Night Calls" - 3:26
14. "Don't You Love Me Anymore" - 5:10
15. "She Came In Through the Bathroom Window" - 2:39

=== Disc 2 ===
1. "Could You Be Loved" - 4:15
2. "Civilized Man" - 3:53
3. "First We Take Manhattan" - 3:44
4. "The Simple Things" - 4:46
5. "N'Oubliez Jamais" - 4:41
6. "That's All I Need to Know" (live) - 4:03
7. "Have a Little Faith in Me" - 4:41
8. "Don't Let the Sun Go Down on Me" - 5:31
9. "Now That the Magic Has Gone" - 4:41
10. "Sweet Little Woman" - 4:03
11. "(All I Know) Feels Like Forever" - 4:42
12. "My Father's Son" - 4:31
13. "Sorry Seems to Be the Hardest Word" - 4:00
14. "Never Tear Us Apart" - 4:04
15. "Ruby Lee" - 7:44

== Charts ==
=== Weekly charts ===
| Chart (2003–2015) | Peak position |
|---|---|
| Austrian Albums (Ö3 Austria) | 28 |
| Belgian Albums (Ultratop Flanders) | 15 |
| Belgian Albums (Ultratop Wallonia) | 56 |
| Dutch Albums (Album Top 100) | 11 |
| Finnish Albums (Suomen virallinen lista) | 30 |
| German Albums (Offizielle Top 100) | 80 |
| Norwegian Albums (VG-lista) | 14 |
| Portuguese Albums (AFP) | 13 |
| Swiss Albums (Schweizer Hitparade) | 34 |

=== Year-end charts ===
| Chart (2004) | Position |
|---|---|
| Dutch Albums (Album Top 100) | 82 |

=== Certifications ===
| Region | Certification | Certified units/sales |
|---|---|---|
| Australia (ARIA) | Gold | 35,000^{^} |
| Germany (BVMI) | Gold | 100,000^{^} |
| New Zealand (RMNZ) | Gold | 7,500^{^} |
| United Kingdom (BPI) | Gold | 100,000^{*} |
^{*} Sales figures based on certification alone.^{^} Shipments figures based on certification alone.
