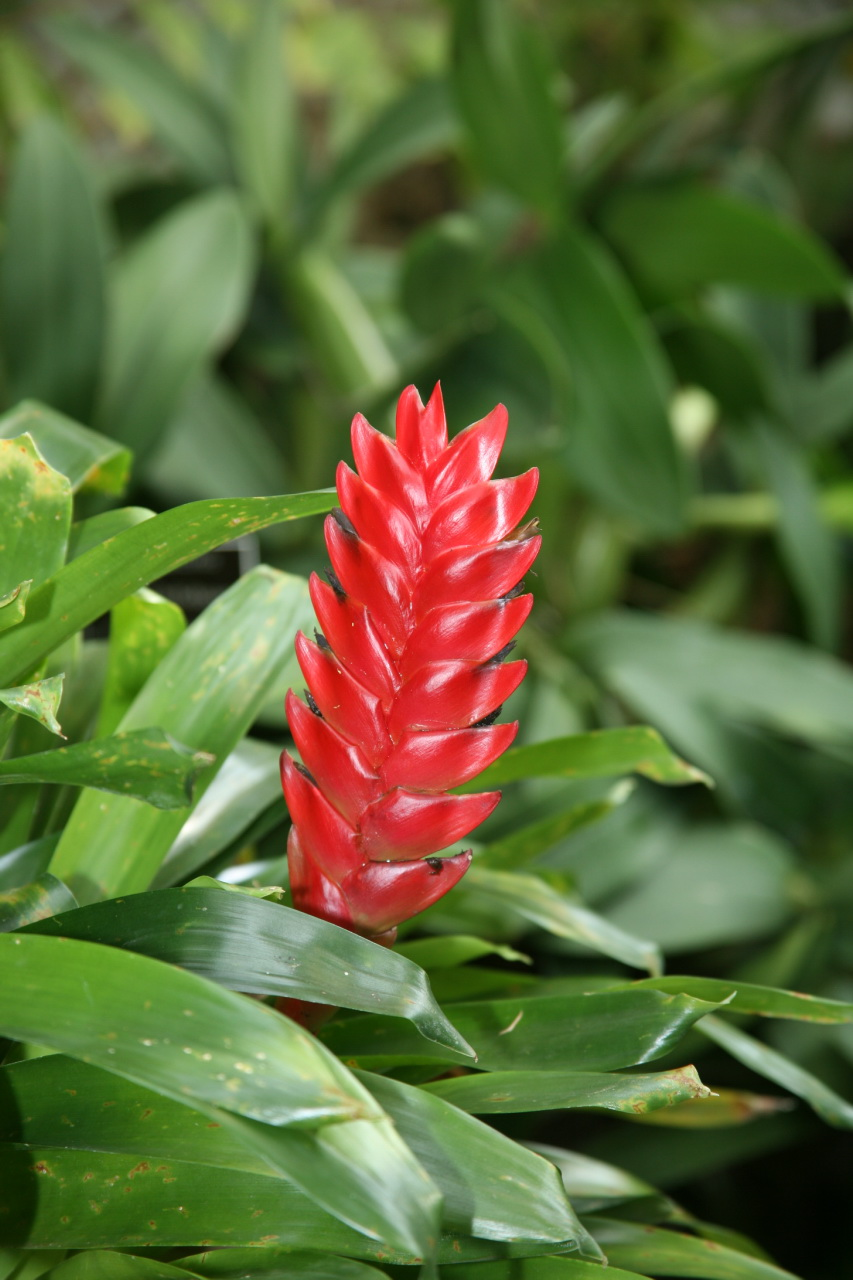

Scientific classification
- Kingdom: Plantae
- Clade: Tracheophytes
- Clade: Angiosperms
- Clade: Monocots
- Clade: Commelinids
- Order: Poales
- Family: Bromeliaceae
- Genus: Vriesea
- Species: V. erythrodactylon

Binomial name
- Vriesea erythrodactylon (E. Morren) E. Morren ex Mez

= Vriesea erythrodactylon =

Species of flowering plant

Vriesea erythrodactylon is a plant species in the genus Vriesea. This species is endemic to Brazil.

== Cultivars ==
- Vriesea 'Fire Rose'
- Vriesea 'Perfidia'
- Vriesea 'Pink Cockatoo'
- Vriesea 'Purple Cockatoo'
- Vriesea 'Purple Haze'
- Vriesea 'Red Flame'
- Vriesea 'Rosa Morena'
- Vriesea 'Ruby Lee'
- Vriesea 'Stoplight'
- Vriesea 'Waggoner'
- Vriesea 'White Cloud'
