= Nidularium campos-portoi =

Scientific classification
- Kingdom: Plantae
- Clade: Tracheophytes
- Clade: Angiosperms
- Clade: Monocots
- Clade: Commelinids
- Order: Poales
- Family: Bromeliaceae
- Genus: Nidularium
- Species: N. campos-portoi

Binomial name
- Nidularium campos-portoi (L.B. Smith) Wanderley & B.A. Moreira

Species of flowering plant

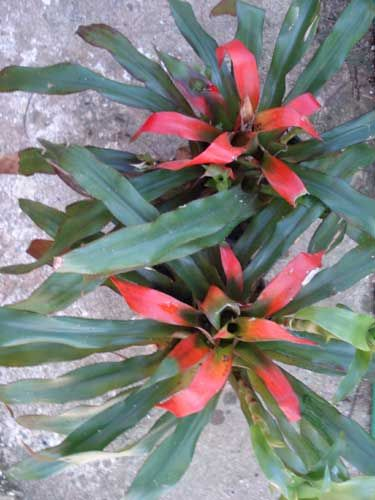
Wittrockia campos portoi

Nidularium campos-portoi is a plant species in the genus Nidularium. This species is endemic to Brazil.
