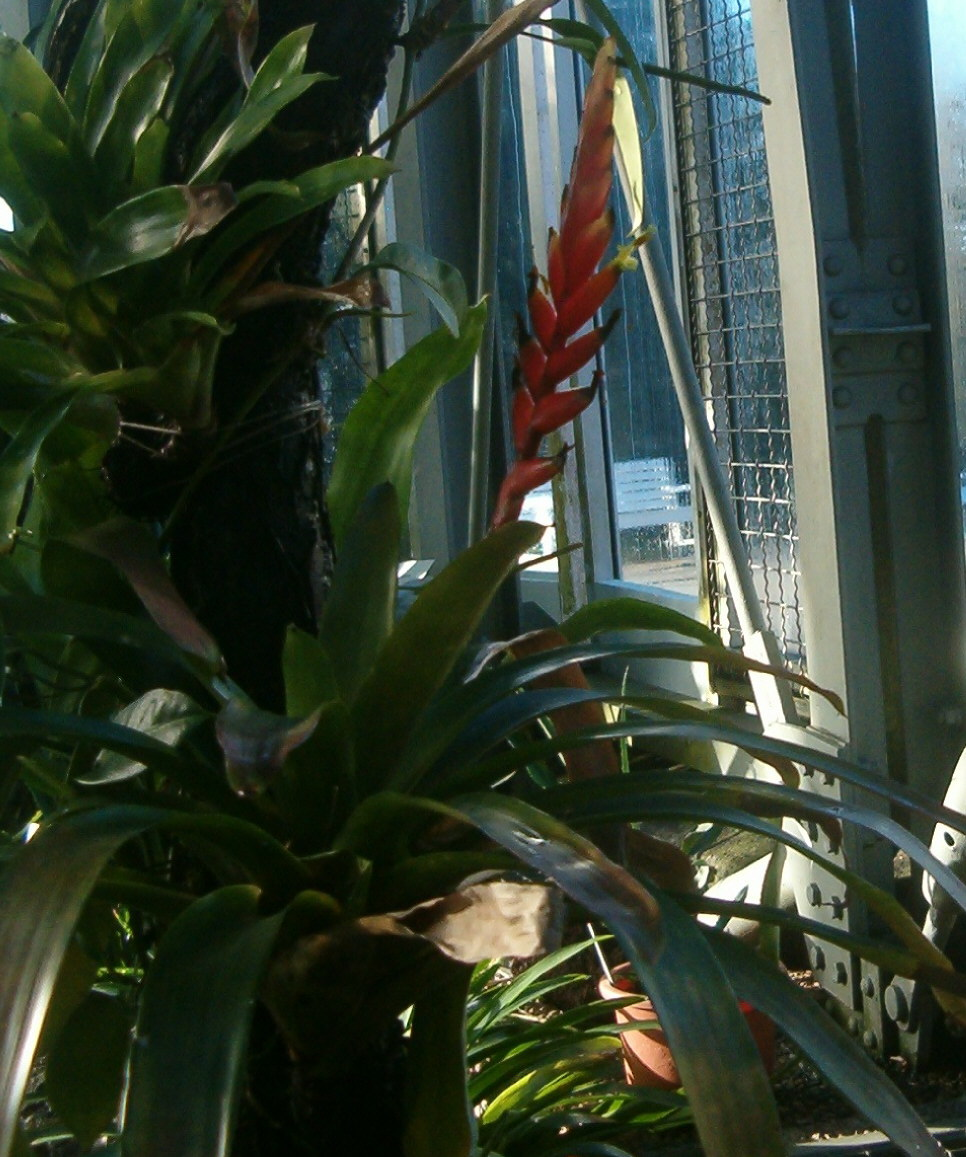

Scientific classification
- Kingdom: Plantae
- Clade: Tracheophytes
- Clade: Angiosperms
- Clade: Monocots
- Clade: Commelinids
- Order: Poales
- Family: Bromeliaceae
- Genus: Vriesea
- Species: V. ensiformis

Binomial name
- Vriesea ensiformis (Vellozo) Beer

= Vriesea ensiformis =

Species of flowering plant

Vriesea ensiformis is a plant species in the genus Vriesea. This species is endemic to Brazil.

== Cultivars ==
- Vriesea 'Aurora Major'
- Vriesea 'Aurora Minor'
- Vriesea 'Copper Penny'
- Vriesea 'Davis(ii)'
- Vriesea 'Derek's Dilemma'
- Vriesea 'Favorite'
- Vriesea 'Furcata'
- Vriesea 'Karamea Bronze Queen'
- Vriesea 'Lav (Lavender)'
- Vriesea 'Perfidia'
- Vriesea 'Po Boy'
- Vriesea 'Ralph Davis'
- Vriesea 'RaRu'
- Vriesea 'Ruby Lee'
- Vriesea 'Son of Yellow Tail'
- Vriesea 'Vista Charm'
- Vriesea 'Warmingii Minor'
- Vriesea 'Witte Senior'
- × Guzvriesea 'Star Fire'
- × Vriecantarea 'Inferno'
- × Vrieslandsia 'Fire Magic'
- × Vrieslandsia 'Red Beacon'
