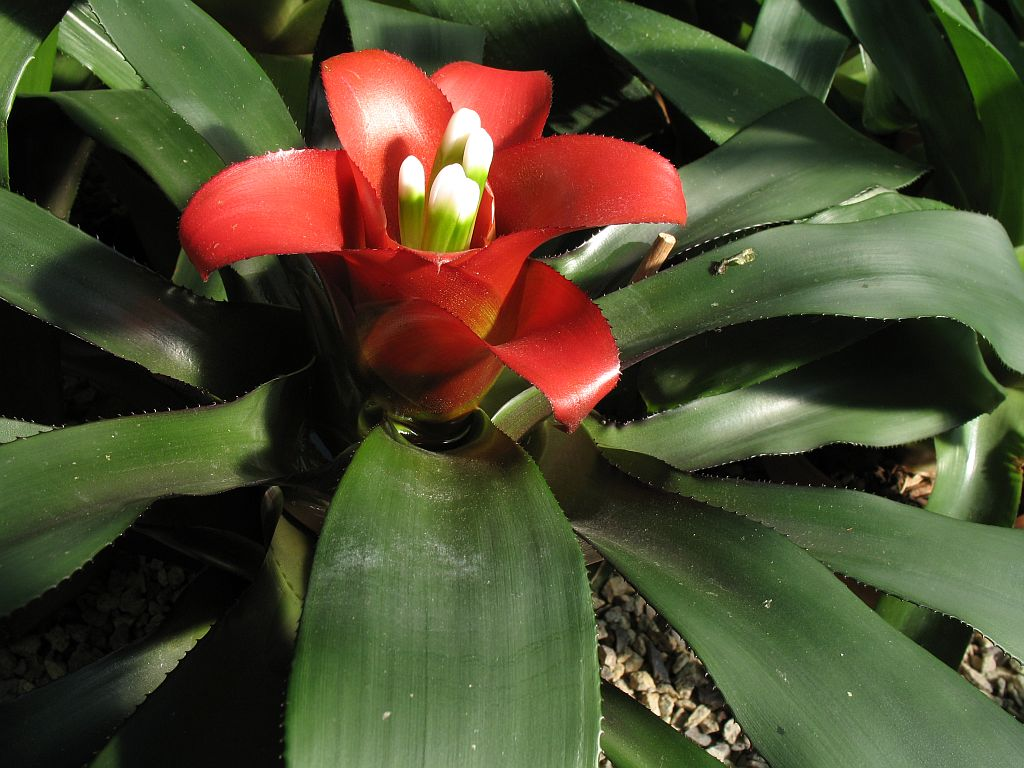

Scientific classification
- Kingdom: Plantae
- Clade: Tracheophytes
- Clade: Angiosperms
- Clade: Monocots
- Clade: Commelinids
- Order: Poales
- Family: Bromeliaceae
- Genus: Nidularium
- Species: N. innocentii

Binomial name
- Nidularium innocentii Lemaire

= Nidularium innocentii =

Species of flowering plant

Nidularium innocentii is a species of bromeliad in the genus Nidularium.

This species is endemic to the Atlantic Forest ecoregion of southeastern Brazil.

== Cultivars ==
Cultivars used as ornamental plants include:

- Nidularium 'Alwyn Gentry'
- Nidularium 'Blue Lines'
- Nidularium 'Chantrieri'
- Nidularium 'Digeneum'
- Nidularium 'Krakatoa'
- Nidularium 'Madame Robert Morobe'
- Nidularium 'Maureanum'
- Nidularium 'Orange Innocent'
- Nidularium 'Red Queen'
- × Nidumea 'Chantrieri'
- × Nidumea 'Midnight'
- × Nidumea 'Penumbra'
- × Nidumea 'Superstar'
- × Niduregelia 'Chantrieri'
- × Niduregelia 'Midnight'
- × Ortholarium 'Hades'
