= Cultural impact of the Beatles =

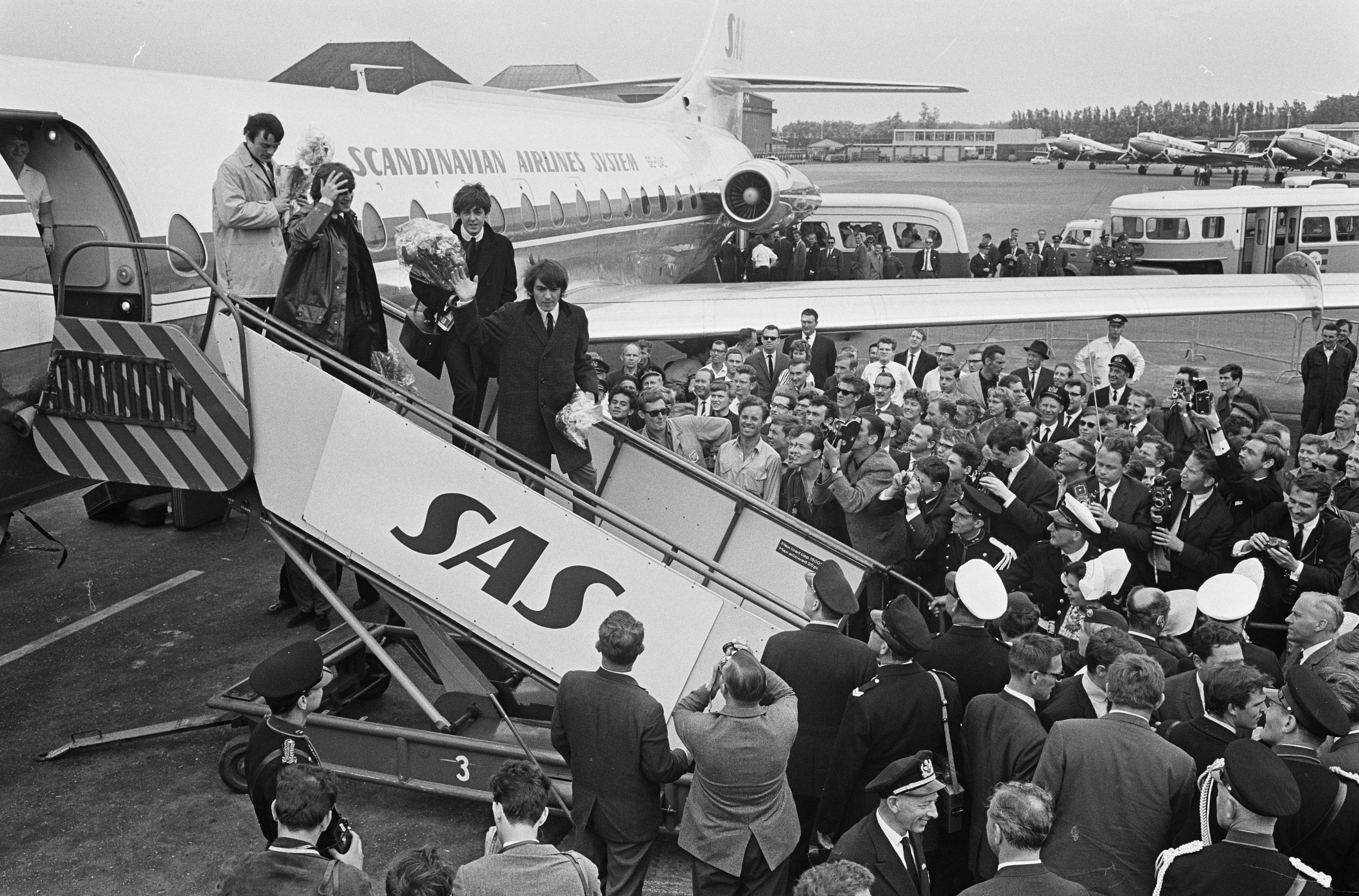
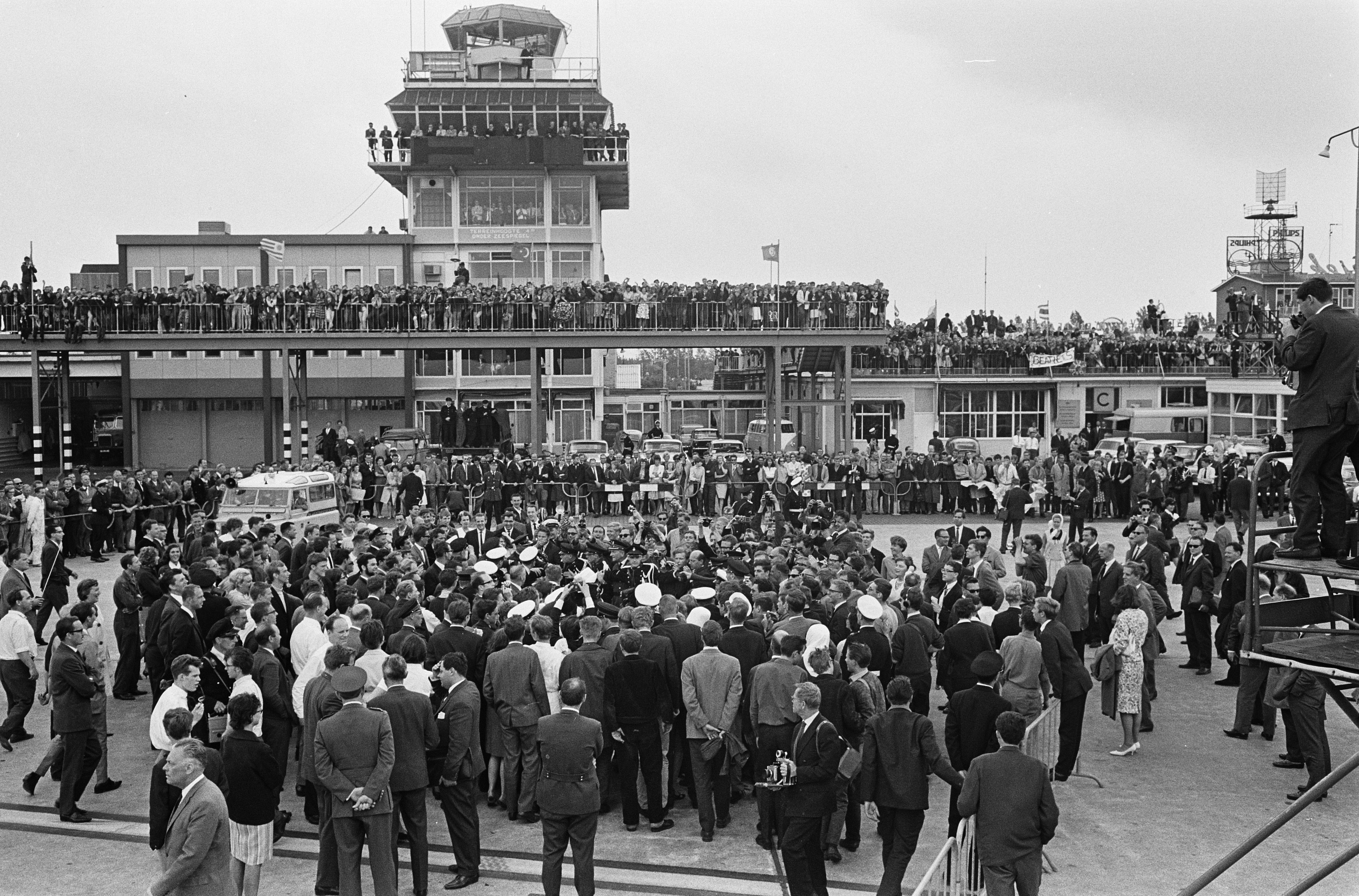
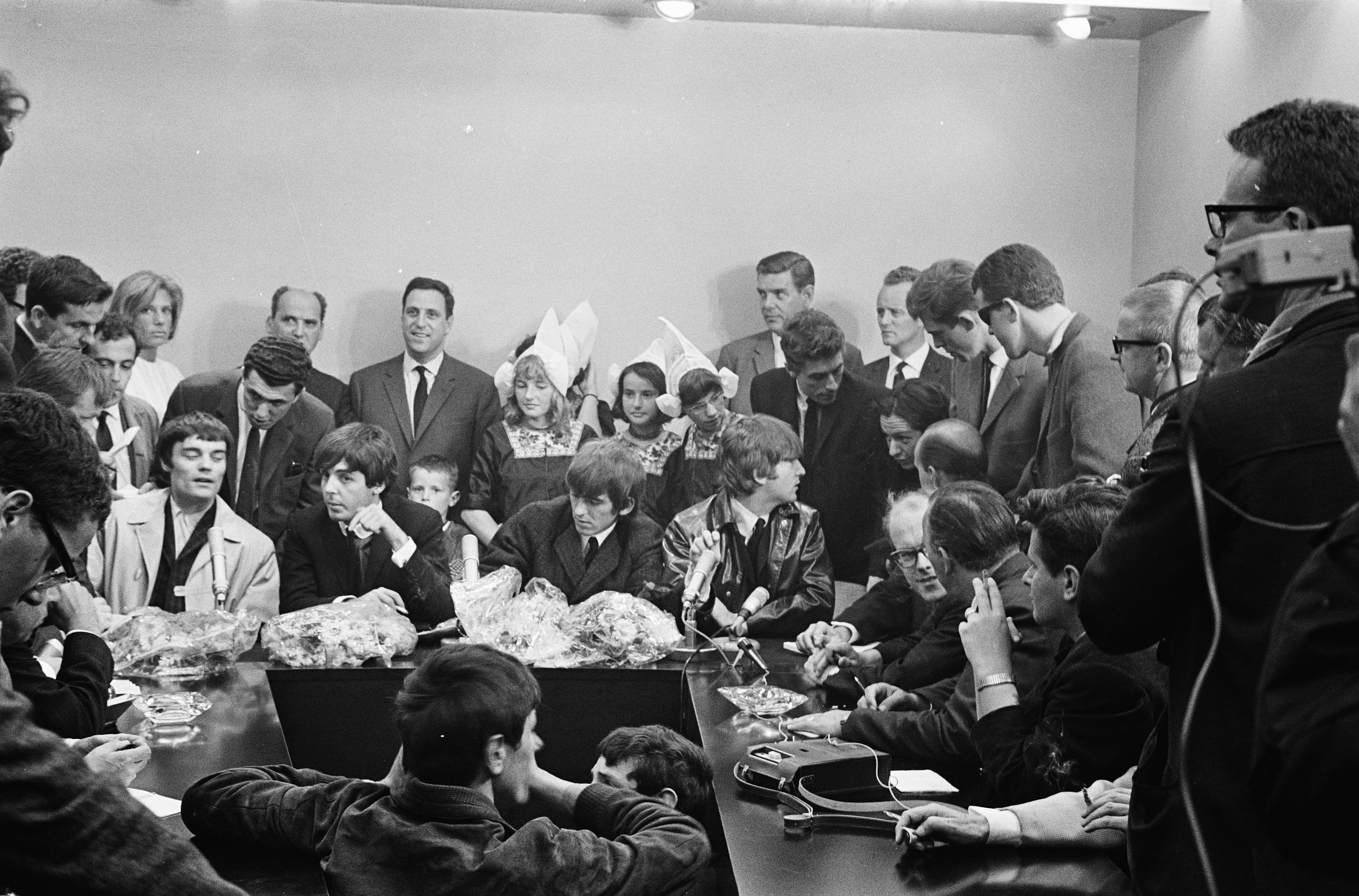
Beatlemania: Fans and media swarm the Beatles at Schiphol Airport, the Netherlands, June 1964.

The English rock band the Beatles, comprising John Lennon, Paul McCartney, George Harrison and Ringo Starr, are commonly regarded as the foremost and most influential band in popular music history. They sparked the "Beatlemania" phenomenon in 1963, gained international superstardom in 1964, and remained active until their break-up in 1970. Over the latter half of the decade, they were often viewed as orchestrators of society's developments. Their recognition concerns their effect on the era's youth and counterculture, British identity, popular music's evolution into an art form, and their unprecedented following.

Many cultural movements of the 1960s were assisted or inspired by the Beatles. In Britain, their rise to prominence signalled the youth-driven changes in postwar society, with respect to social mobility, teenagers' commercial influence, and informality. They spearheaded the shift from American artists' global dominance of rock and roll to British acts (known in the US as the British Invasion) and inspired young people to pursue music careers. From 1964 to 1970, the Beatles had the top-selling US single one out of every six weeks and the top-selling US album one out of every three weeks. In 1965, they were awarded MBEs, the first time such an honour was bestowed on a British pop act. A year later, Lennon controversially remarked that the band were "more popular than Jesus now".

The Beatles often incorporated classical elements, traditional pop forms and unconventional recording techniques in innovative ways, especially with the albums Rubber Soul (1965), Revolver (1966) and Sgt. Pepper's Lonely Hearts Club Band (1967). Many of their advances in production, writing, and artistic presentation were soon widespread. Other cultural changes initiated by the group include the elevation of the album to the dominant form of record consumption over singles, a wider interest in psychedelic drugs and Eastern spirituality, and several fashion trends. They also pioneered with their record sleeves and music videos, as well as informed music styles such as jangle, folk rock, power pop, psychedelia, art pop, progressive rock, heavy metal and electronic music. By the end of the decade, the Beatles were seen as an embodiment of the era's sociocultural movements, exemplified by the sentiment of their 1967 song "All You Need Is Love".

Over the 1960s, the Beatles were the dominant youth-centred pop act on the sales charts. They broke numerous sales and attendance records, many of which they have or had maintained for decades, and hold a canonised status unprecedented for popular musicians. Their songs are among the most recorded in history, with cover versions of "Yesterday" reaching 1,600 by 1986. They are the best-selling music act in history, with estimated sales of over 600 million records worldwide. Time included the Beatles in its list of the twentieth century's 100 most important people.

== Scope ==
The Beatles formed in Liverpool in 1960. Their most well-known lineup consisted of John Lennon, Paul McCartney, George Harrison and Ringo Starr, they gained international stardom in 1964, and remained active until their break-up in 1970. Throughout their career, they expanded collective notions regarding the limits of commercial and artistic achievement. The Rolling Stone Encyclopedia of Rock & Roll (2001) defined their "incalculable" influence as encompassing "all of Western culture". The writers state that the group's discography held the precedent for "virtually every rock experiment ... Although many of their sales and attendance records have since been surpassed, no group has so radically transformed the sound and significance of rock & roll." Writing for AllMusic, critic Richie Unterberger recognises the Beatles as both "the greatest and most influential act of the rock era" and a group that "introduced more innovations into popular music than any other rock band of the 20th century". He adds:

They were among the few artists of any discipline that were simultaneously the best at what they did and the most popular at what they did. Relentlessly imaginative and experimental, the Beatles grabbed hold of the international mass consciousness in 1964 and never let go for the next six years, always staying ahead of the pack in terms of creativity but never losing their ability to communicate their increasingly sophisticated ideas to a mass audience.

Many contemporary listeners viewed the Beatles as orchestrators of society's developments over the second half of the 1960s. Musicologist Allan F. Moore states that there have been occasions when "audiences gravitate towards a centre" of pop music culture, the most prominent of which was in the early to mid 1960s, a period in which it "seems that almost everyone, irrespective of age, class or cultural background, listened to the Beatles". Music critic Greil Marcus described the Beatles' impact as the second "pop explosion", after Elvis Presley's emergence in the 1950s, and defined the term as "an irresistible cultural explosion that cuts across lines of class and race, and, most crucially, divides society itself by age". In such a phenomenon, he continued, "The surface of daily life (walk, talk, dress, symbolism, heroes, family affairs) is affected with such force that deep and substantive changes in the way large numbers of people think and act take place." According to author and film-maker Hanif Kureishi, the Beatles are "the only mere pop group you could remove from history and suggest that culturally, without them, things would have been significantly different".

Detractors of the Beatles' legacy argue that the band are overrated and are often credited for innovations that other acts were the first to achieve. Music historian Bill Martin cites such notions as part of modern culture's inability to fully "understand them as a force", and says that although rock music has been defined by "synthesis and transmutation" since it began, "what was original about the Beatles is that they synthesized and transmuted more or less everything, they did this in a way that reflected their time, they reflected their time in a way that spoke to a great part of humanity, and they did all of this really, really well." Ian MacDonald states that the band were keen observers who discovered trends in their infancy and were adept at mirroring the era's "social and psychological changes". He said that their connection with the times was such that the Beatles "did far more mind-liberating" than Bob Dylan, through their greater record sales and "because they worked in simpler, less essentially sceptical ways".

== Sales and attendance records ==
Over the 1960s as a whole, the Beatles were the dominant youth-centred pop act on the sales charts. "She Loves You", the band's second number-one single on the Record Retailer chart (subsequently adopted as the UK Singles Chart), became the best-selling single in UK chart history, a position it retained until 1978. The band's first two albums, Please Please Me and With the Beatles, each topped Record Retailer's LPs chart, for a combined run of 51 consecutive weeks. Beginning with "From Me to You" in 1963, the Beatles had a four-year run of eleven consecutive chart-topping singles in Record Retailer, ending when the double A-side single "Strawberry Fields Forever" / "Penny Lane" peaked at number two.

On 4 April 1964, the Beatles occupied the top five US chart positions – with "Can't Buy Me Love", "Twist and Shout", "She Loves You", "I Want to Hold Your Hand" and "Please Please Me" – as well as 11 other positions on the Billboard Hot 100. For nine consecutive weeks, they held the top two places on the Billboard Top LPs chart (subsequently the Billboard 200) with reconfigured versions of their first two albums. Until 2018, they were the only act to have filled the top five of the Billboard Hot 100. (Note: In July 2018, the record was broken by Canadian rapper Drake, with six songs.) They also broke 11 other chart records on Billboard's singles and albums charts at that time. Their chart domination was commonplace in countries around the world during 1964. In Australia, in late March, the band's songs filled the top six chart positions; during one week, they held nine positions in Canada's top ten.

On 15 August 1965, the Beatles became the first entertainment act to stage a concert in a sports stadium when they performed at Shea Stadium in New York City before an audience of 55,600. The event set records for attendance and revenue generation, with takings of $304,000 (equivalent to $3.11 million in 2025). The band's record run of six consecutive number-ones on the Billboard Hot 100 from January 1965 to January 1966 – with the songs "I Feel Fine", "Eight Days a Week", "Ticket to Ride", "Help!", "Yesterday" and "We Can Work It Out" – remained unbeaten until Whitney Houston achieved a seventh in 1988.

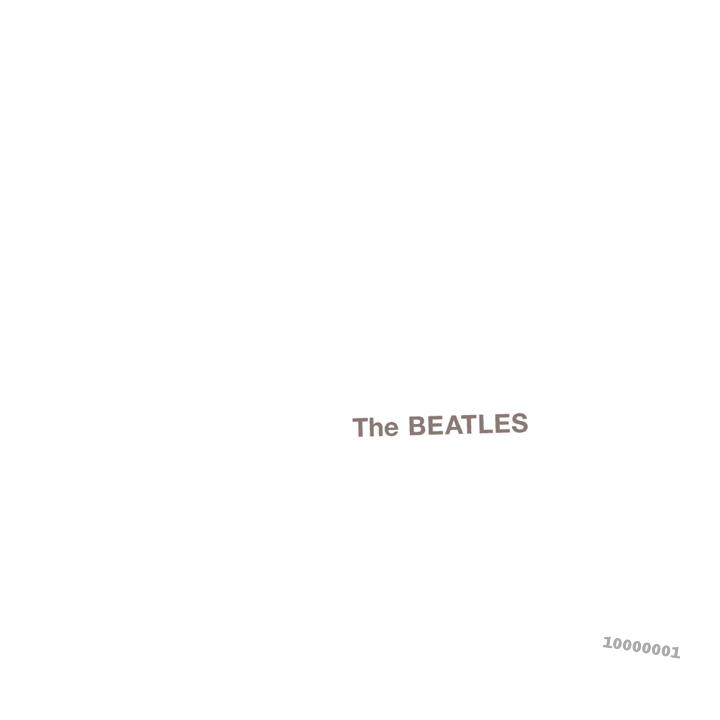
Cover of The Beatles (also known as the "White Album"). The double LP was recognised by Guinness World Records as the fastest-selling album of all time.

Sgt. Pepper's Lonely Hearts Club Band (1967) was the top-selling album of the 1960s in the UK, and on four occasions they had the best-selling album of the year there. As of 2019, with certified sales of 5.1 million copies in the UK, Sgt. Pepper is the all-time third best-selling album there and the best-selling studio album. The 1968 double LP The Beatles (also known as the "White Album") became the fastest-selling album in history; Capitol Records reported advance orders of 2 million in the US, with many stores selling their entire stock in one day.

In the UK, the Beatles are beaten only by Presley for their amount of number-one singles and combined weeks at number one. As of December 2018, the Beatles held the record for the most Christmas number-one hits there, with four, of which three were achieved in successive years between 1963 and 1965. In the list of the UK's top sellers for the decade, the band's albums filled the top ten, apart from the soundtracks to The Sound of Music, South Pacific and West Side Story. The Beatles took the next three positions, meaning that all ten of their UK number-one albums were among the thirteen best-selling albums of the 1960s. In the case of US sales for the 1960s, the Beatles were the top artist, ahead of Presley, in both singles and albums. Between February 1964 and July 1970, the band maintained the number-one single on the Billboard Hot 100 for a total of 59 weeks and topped Billboard's LPs chart for 116 weeks. In other words, they had the top-selling single one out of every six weeks, and the top-selling album one out of every three weeks.

== Breakthrough and role in Britain's cultural resurgence ==
=== Merseybeat and British rock 'n' roll ===
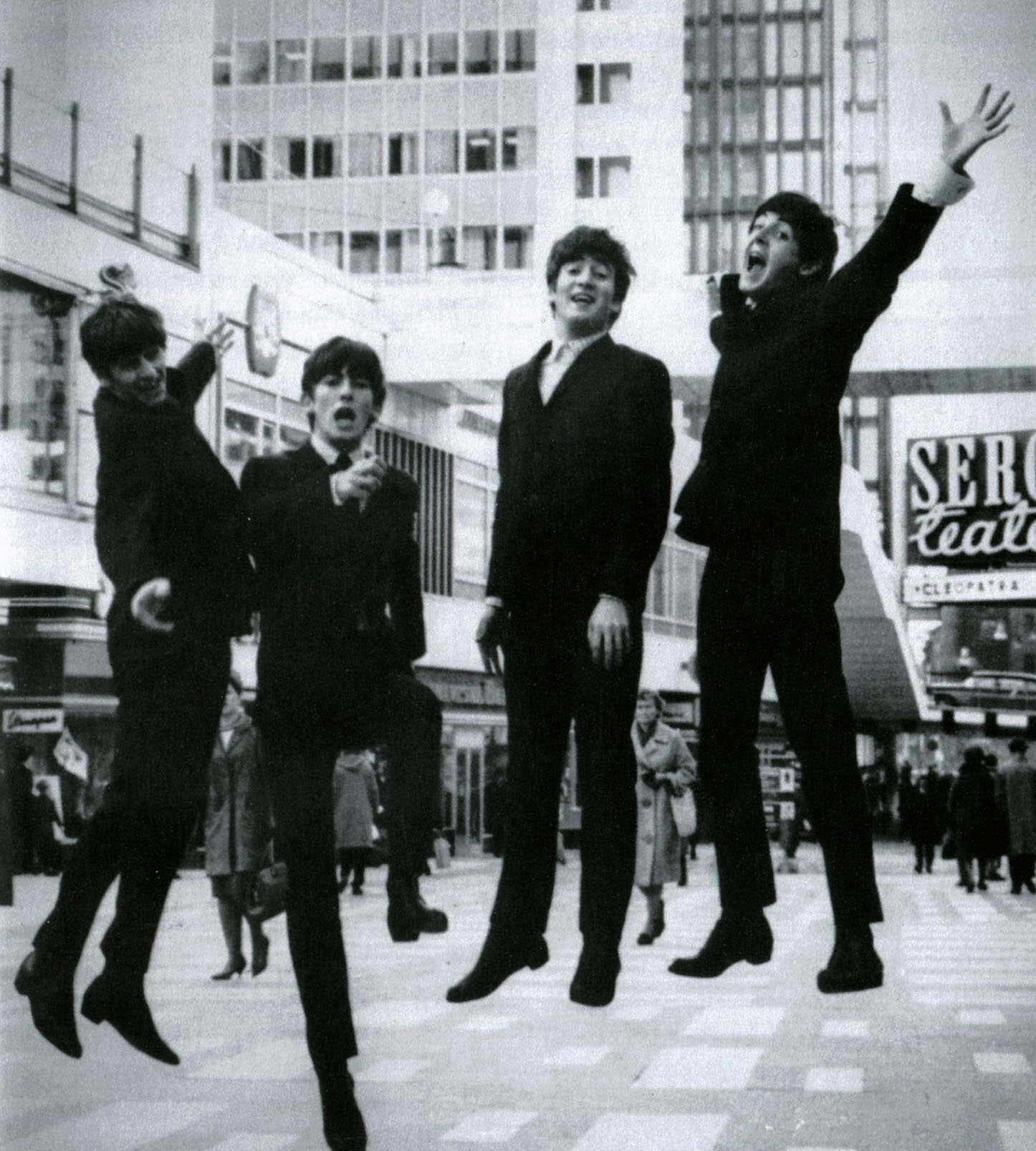
The Beatles in Stockholm, October 1963. Due to the crowds of screaming fans who attended the band's arrival in Sweden, the local press described the scene as "The Battle of Stockholm Airport".

As the Beatles rose in popularity in 1963, the terms "Mersey sound" and "Merseybeat" were applied to bands and singers from Liverpool, making it the first time in British pop music that a sound and a location were linked together. (The River Mersey flows through Liverpool.) The city had the cultural advantages of being the UK's main transatlantic port and having an ethnically diverse population; local musicians were able to access records by American musicians through the Cunard Yanks working on the shipping routes.

Like many Liverpool bands, the Beatles formed their sound from skiffle and a combination of American influences, especially rhythm and blues and girl groups, and honed their live act through seasons performing in the red-light district of Hamburg in West Germany. The music was performed with an emphasis on beat and guitars, at the expense of saxophones or other instruments commonly heard on the American records. Under pressure from Liverpool venues such as the Cavern, their manager, Brian Epstein, persuaded the Beatles to swap their favoured look of black leather jackets and pants for more presentable stage suits. The group's emergence as leaders of the Liverpool beat scene represented a departure from the London-focused tradition of the UK music industry.

Released in October 1962, "Love Me Do", the band's debut single as EMI recording artists, contrasted with the polished style of contemporary UK hit songs. According to author Peter Doggett, the January 1963 follow-up, "Please Please Me", represented "the real birth of the new" as, aided by Lennon's impassioned vocal, the song was "more driven than any previous British pop record". As musicians and songwriters, the Beatles established working-class authenticity and informality as key aspects in British rock 'n' roll. Doggett adds that "Most of all, the Beatles sounded like a gang: forceful, persuasive and sexually potent."

Starting in 1963, according to music historian David Simonelli, the Beatles initiated the "original golden age" of British rock 'n' roll and reversed a tradition whereby domestic acts were a "pale imitation" of the original American purveyors of the style. During the first half of that year, the band usurped American acts including Roy Orbison to become the headline performers on their joint UK tours, something no previous British act accomplished while touring with artists from the US. Their initial success opened the way for many other Liverpool groups to achieve national success and encouraged the country's four main, London-based record companies to seek out talent in other areas of northern England. As a result, the Beatles and other British acts dominated the charts in 1963 at the expense of American artists.

=== Sociocultural influence ===
The Beatles' much-copied mid-air leap on their Twist and Shout EP sleeve was the epitome of antidotal Mersey Beat ... Scouse was now the most romantic dialect in the country, and the bigger chain stores were stocking Beatle wallpaper, 22-carat Beatle bracelets and Fab Four powder compacts.

— Author Alan Clayson

The Beatles' emergence overlapped with the decline in British conservatism. In the description of author and musician Bob Stanley, their domestic breakthrough represented "a final liberation for Britain's teenagers" and, by coinciding with the end of National Service, the group "effectively signaled the end of World War II in Britain". For sociologists, the band typified new developments in postwar Britain such as social mobility, teenagers' commercial influence, and informality in society. In their 1965 book Generation X, Charles Hamblett and Jane Deverson said the Beatles had supplied British youth culture with a unifying and liberating influence that departed from the usual American-inspired model and, together with other groups from outside London, had fostered a sense of celebration of provincial England. The authors commented that resistance to the Beatles' progressive social influence from establishment figures was because the band were "knocking the stuffing – and the stuffiness – out of the neo-Victorians".

The band's appeal registered with members of the royal family when the Beatles played a toned-down selection of songs at the Royal Variety Performance on 4 November 1963. The show was watched by a television audience of 26 million, around half the population of the UK, and helped establish the group as one of the first "spectacles" of the 1960s. Reluctant to play at such a formal event, Lennon told Epstein that he planned to sabotage the occasion. He instead charmed the theatre audience with his final comment: "For our last number ['Twist and Shout'], I'd like to ask your help. The people in the cheaper seats, clap your hands. And the rest of you, if you'd just rattle your jewellery."

=== Political significance and awarding of MBEs ===
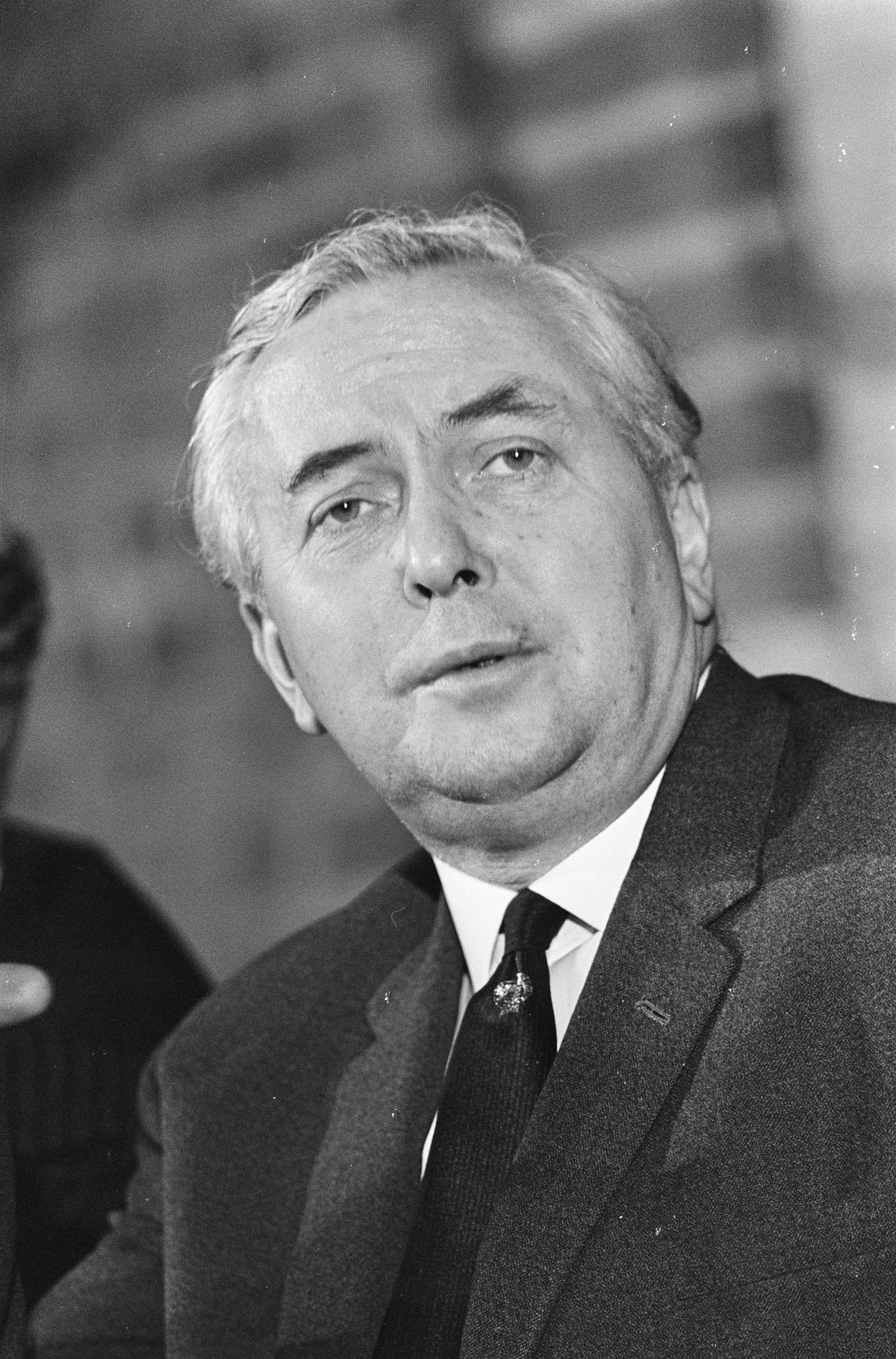
Harold Wilson, Britain's Labour prime minister from 1964 to 1970. Pundits viewed him as representing a change to the established order and part of the same progressive influence that included the Beatles.

The Beatles' international success created an export market for British pop for the first time and provided a boon to the UK government's balance of payments deficit. This unexpected development led to approval from politicians and an eagerness on their part to be associated with the band. In the run-up to the 1964 general election, the Beatles became a political football for the two major political parties; the New Statesman reported that Conservative candidates were told to "mention the Beatles whenever possible in their speeches", while a cartoon in the Daily Express showed the Conservative prime minister, Alec Douglas-Home, and Labour's leader of the opposition, Harold Wilson, consulting the Beatles over the Profumo affair. During the election campaign, both parties accused the other of trying to use the band's popularity for political gain. In March 1964, Wilson, who was contesting the outer Liverpool seat of Huyton, engineered a photo opportunity with the group as they received their Variety Club "Show Business Personality of the Year" awards. The association endured in the public's mind, securing Wilson the youth vote and aiding in his election win. (Note: The Beatles were nevertheless ambivalent towards Wilson and party politics in general. With reference to the colour and shape of the Variety Club awards, Lennon quipped, "Thanks for the Purple Hearts, Harold." Wilson's courting of the Beatles anticipated Labour prime minister Tony Blair hosting Britpop stars at 10 Downing Street in 1997 during the Cool Britannia era.)

The Beatles' international success also benefited the country's tourism and fashion industries, and entertainment generally. In early 1965, Melody Maker initiated a campaign for the Beatles to be awarded MBEs, a move that Wilson supported and set in motion. When the band received their MBEs from Queen Elizabeth II in October, it was unprecedented recognition for pop musicians, anticipating the honours (including knighthoods) that were regularly bestowed on the country's entertainers in subsequent decades. The award was in acknowledgement of the Beatles' contribution to the national economy and reflected the value of their popularity to the Labour government. (Note: By 1965, according to author Jonathan Gould, the gross revenue from the band's records, films, concerts and song publishing was said to be "[in] the order of a hundred million dollars a year".) Wilson's Cabinet minister Tony Benn, who opposed the award, thought it was equally indicative of the royal family's wish to appeal to the masses in the new era of egalitarianism and meritocracy.

=== Britain's leadership of international culture ===
In his book on the 1960s, social historian Arthur Marwick identifies the Beatles' US breakthrough as the "single critical event" that established "the hegemony of youth-inspired British popular culture". With other countries succumbing to the Beatles' influence, according to Simonelli, the band "virtually redefined what it meant to be British", and British culture became "the most exciting culture on earth" for the first time since the start of the industrial age. The surge in exports revenue extended to film and other commercial artistic pursuits, and recognition of London as the "Swinging City" of international culture.

With the Beatles having moved to London in 1963, in Simonelli's description, they served as the "maypole" at the centre of the city's cultural influence throughout the 1960s. Marwick says they represented the popular image of a phenomenon in which "hitherto invisible swathes of British society became visible and assertive" and their 1966 single "Paperback Writer" was the song that best conveyed "the new class-defying tide of individualistic enterprise". Liverpool poet Roger McGough credited the Beatles with establishing the "mythology of Liverpool" through their 1967 songs "Strawberry Fields Forever" and "Penny Lane", in the manner that American rock 'n' roll songs had traditionally done for US cities and roads.

== Beatlemania ==
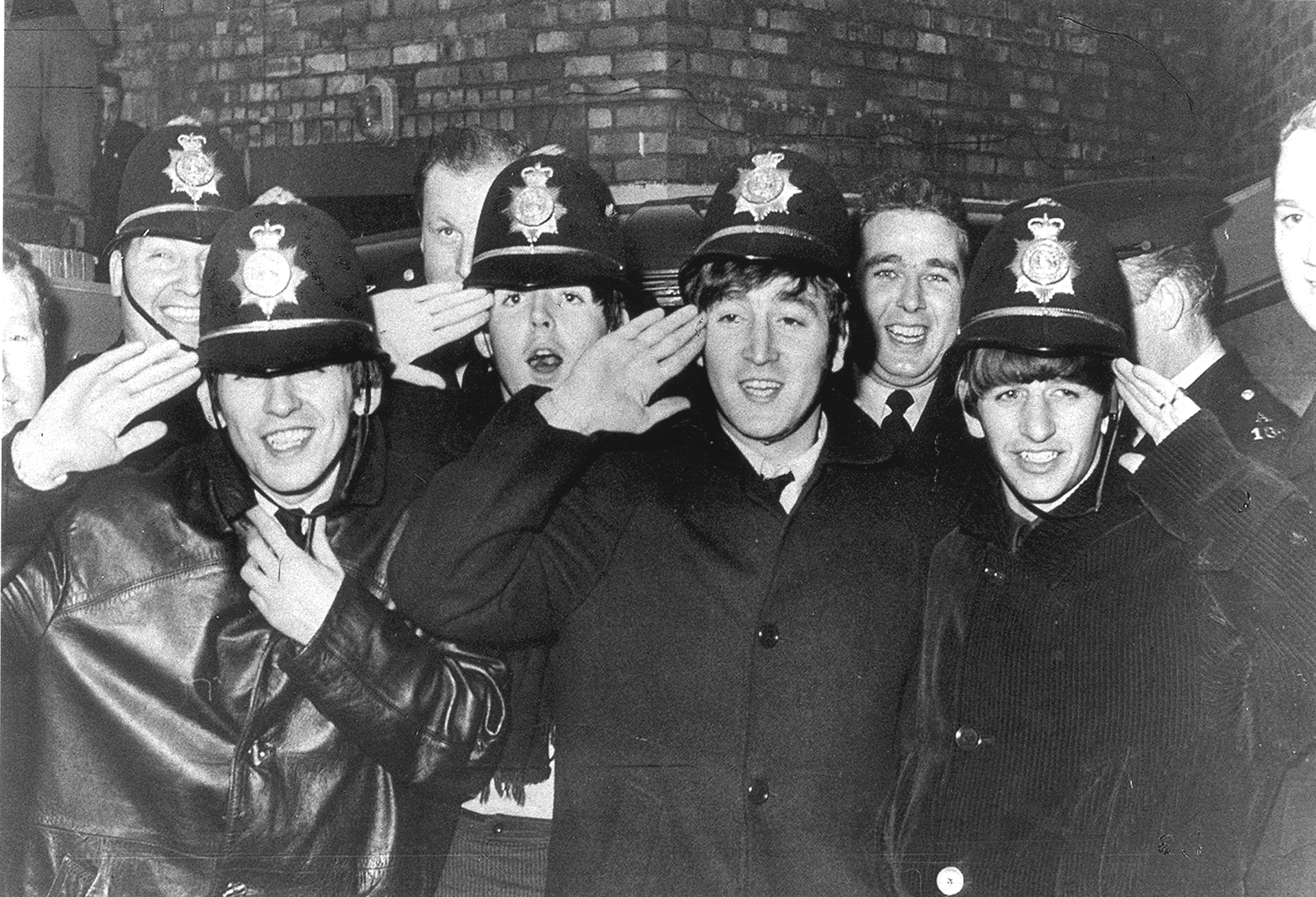
The Beatles outside the Birmingham Hippodrome, November 1963. Because the crowds were so thick, they had to be smuggled into the venue with assistance from local police.

In late 1963, the British press coined the term "Beatlemania" to describe the phenomenal and increasingly hysterical interest in the Beatles. The word was first widely used following the band's 13 October appearance on Sunday Night at the London Palladium; amid reports of wild crowd scenes outside the venue, and after 15 million viewers watched the broadcast, Britain was said to be "in the grip of Beatlemania". The "yeah, yeah, yeah!" refrain of "She Loves You" was a signature hook for their European audiences. Its falsetto "ooh!"s elicited further fan delirium when accompanied by McCartney and Harrison's exaggerated shaking of their moptop hair. Once it became an international phenomenon in 1964, Beatlemania surpassed in its intensity and reach any previous examples of fan worship, including those afforded to Presley and Frank Sinatra.

Displays of mania were repeated wherever the band played. When the group toured Australia in June 1964, the population afforded the visit the status of a national event. A crowd of 300,000 – the largest recorded gathering of Australians in one place – welcomed the Beatles to Adelaide. Sid Bernstein, the US promoter who arranged the band's Shea Stadium concerts, said that only Adolf Hitler had had such power over the masses. (Note: In November 1963, The Daily Telegraph published an article condemning Beatlemania and likening Beatles concerts to Hitler's Nuremberg Rallies.) Bernstein was sure that the group "could sway a presidential election if they wanted to". Around 4,000 fans gathered outside Buckingham Palace in central London when the Beatles received their MBEs from the Queen. As the crowd chanted "God save the Beatles" and "Yeah, yeah, yeah!", some fans jostled with police officers and scaled the palace gates. Referring to this spectacle, journalist Robert Sandall later commented that "Never had a ruling monarch been so thoroughly upstaged by a group of her subjects as was Elizabeth II on [26 October 1965]."

The Beatles became bored with all aspects of touring – including fans offering themselves sexually to the band, and the high-pitched screaming that rendered their performances inaudible. Beatlemania continued on a reduced scale after the band retired from touring, and after the members became solo artists. In their book Encyclopedia of Classic Rock, David Luhrssen and Michael Larson write that while boy bands such as One Direction have continued to attract audiences of screaming girls, no act has "moved pop culture forward or achieved the breadth and depth of the Beatles' fandom".

== US breakthrough and British Invasion ==
"I Want to Hold Your Hand" (1963)
Bob Dylan said of "I Want to Hold Your Hand": "They were doing things nobody was doing. Their chords were outrageous, just outrageous, and their harmonies made it all valid."

Most Americans were introduced to the Beatles' music with the single "I Want to Hold Your Hand" backed with "I Saw Her Standing There", rising to the top of US charts on 1 February 1964. Both songs featured a harder-edged guitar sound that stood out as a revival of the "rebellious" spirit absent from newer rock and roll acts and as a rejection of the regular assortment of novelty songs, teen idols, folk singers and girl groups that occupied US charts in the weeks and months previous. MacDonald wrote: "every American artist, black or white, asked about 'I Want to Hold Your Hand' has said much the same: it altered everything, ushering in a new era and changing their lives."

On 9 February, the Beatles gave their first live US television performance on The Ed Sullivan Show, watched by approximately 73 million viewers in over 23 million households, or 34 per cent of the US population. The Nielsen rating service reported that it was the largest audience number ever recorded for an American television program. Music journalist Neil McCormick, writing in 2015, described the Beatles' debut on the show as pop music's "big bang moment", while Stanley calls it "arguably the most significant postwar cultural event in America", adding that "Their rise, the scale of it and their impact on society, was completely unprecedented." Their second appearance on The Ed Sullivan Show, on 16 February, was watched by around 70 million viewers.

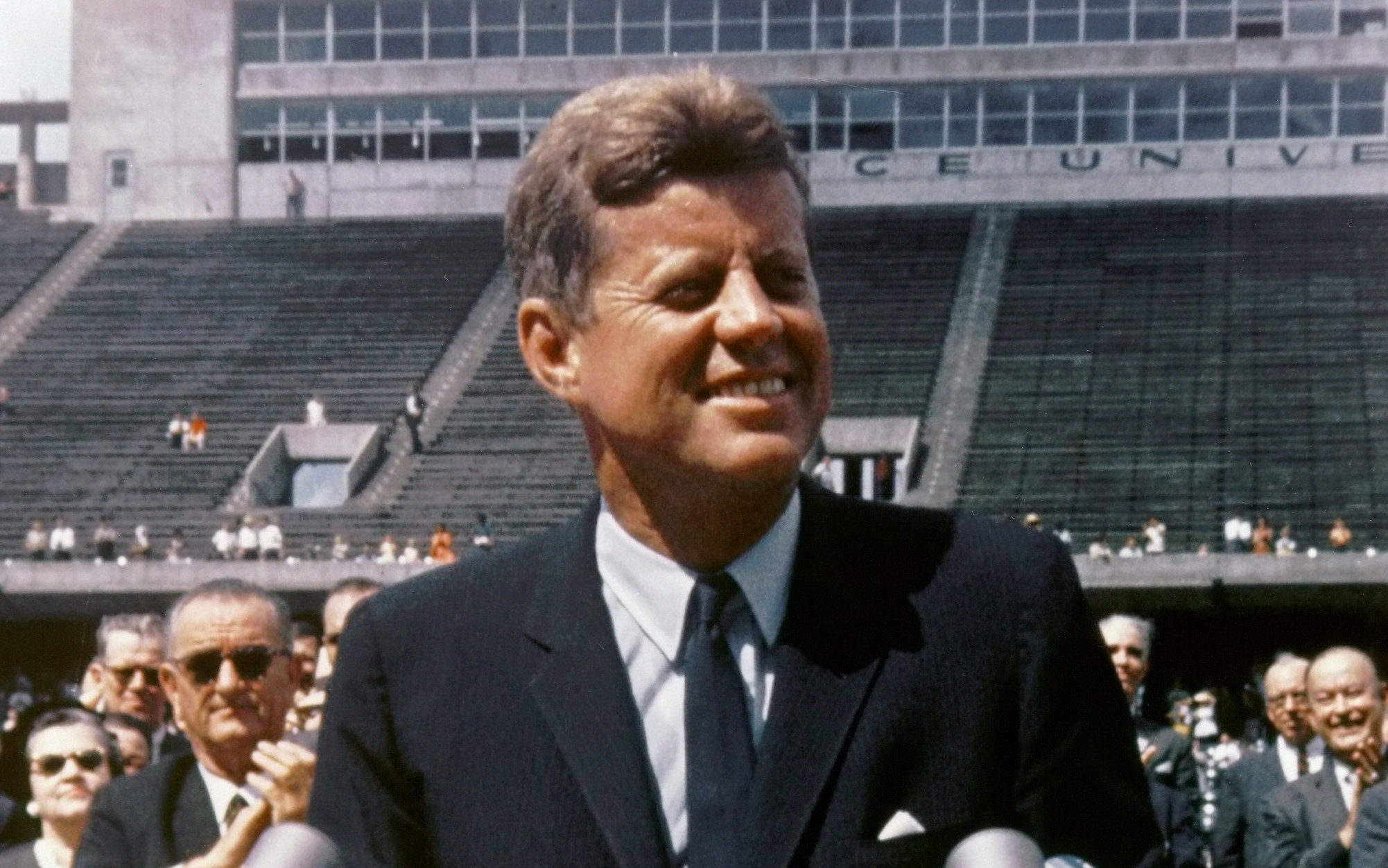
John F. Kennedy in September 1962. Journalist Christopher Booker described Kennedy and the Beatles as the "supreme 'dream figures'" of the 1960s.

Eleven weeks before the Beatles' arrival in the US, President John F. Kennedy was assassinated, a source of profound national mourning that American commentators at the time linked to young people's embrace of the Beatles and their music. For many Americans, particularly young baby boomers, the Beatles' visit reignited the sense of excitement and possibility that had been taken by Kennedy's assassination. A teenage New Yorker in early 1964, author Nicholas Schaffner later wrote that the Kennedy link was "an exaggeration, perhaps", but the Beatles "more than filled the energy gap" left by the demise of 1950s rock 'n' roll for an audience accustomed to the "vacuous" music that had replaced it.

For decades, the US had dominated popular entertainment culture throughout much of the world, via Hollywood films, jazz, and the music of Broadway and Tin Pan Alley. In early 1964, Life magazine declared: "In [1776] England lost her American colonies. Last week the Beatles took them back." The Beatles subsequently sparked the British Invasion of the US and became a globally influential phenomenon. Recalling the Beatles' sudden popularity, Brian Wilson of the Beach Boys felt that the Beatles had "eclipsed ... the whole music world". Bob Dylan recalled that, by April 1964, "a definite line was being drawn. This was something that had never happened before ... I knew they were pointing the direction of where music had to go."

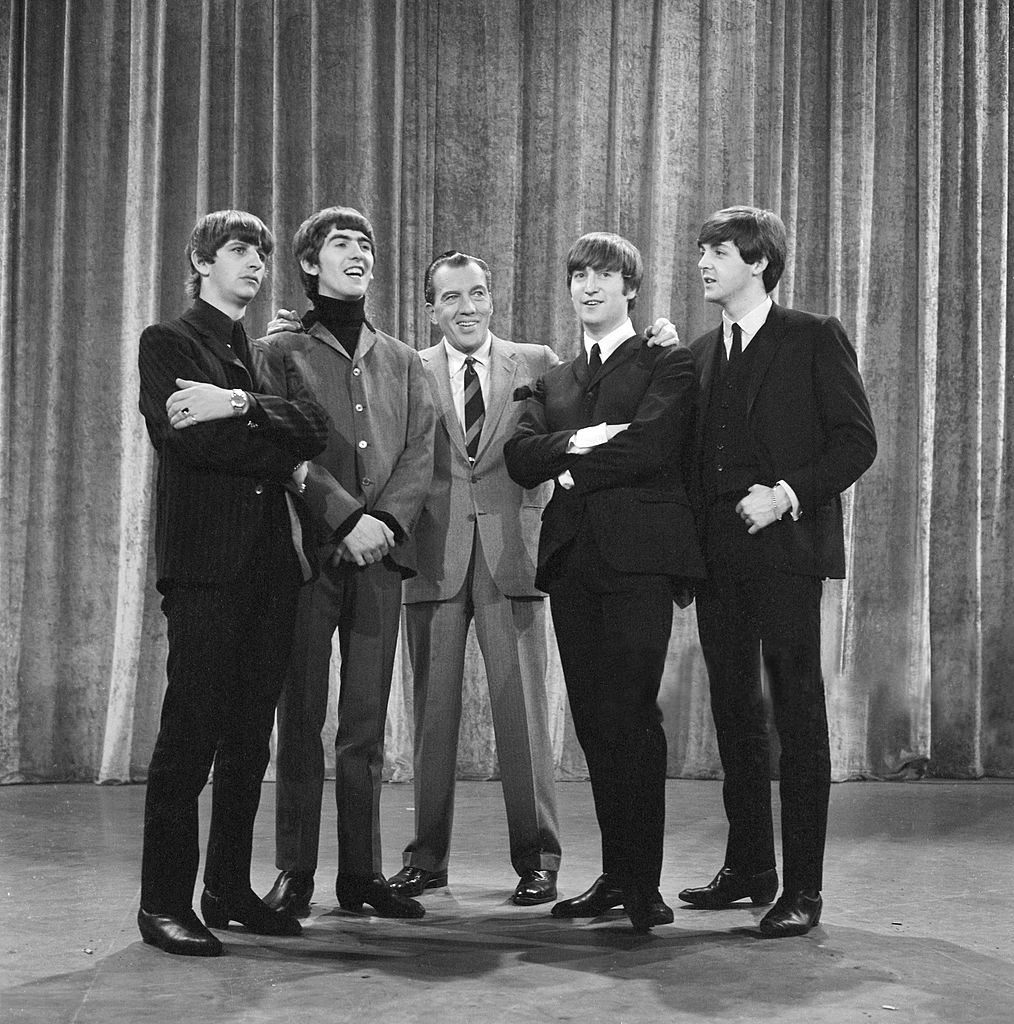
The Beatles with Ed Sullivan, February 1964

The Beatles' success in the US established the popularity of British groups and affected the musical style of American bands. In doing so, however, the Beatles inadvertently caused a sharp decrease in sales for black artists and the decline of many of the girl groups they admired. By mid 1964, several more UK acts arrived in the US, including the Dave Clark Five, the Rolling Stones, Billy J. Kramer and Gerry & the Pacemakers. Confirming the British Invasion of the US pop market, one-third of all top ten hits there in 1964 were performed by British acts. The depth of the Beatles' US impact was also reflected in a wave of easy listening adaptations of their songs, aimed at the adult market. This trend was led by the Boston Pops Orchestra recording "I Want to Hold Your Hand" and the Hollyridge Strings covering "All My Loving", after which the latter orchestra released the 1964 album The Beatles Song Book.

The extent of the Beatles' impact on American music was disputed in a 2015 study conducted by the Queen Mary University of London and Imperial College London. By analysing shifts in chord progressions, beats, lyrics and vocals, the study indicated that American music was moving away from mellow sounds like doo-wop and into more energetic rock styles since the beginning of the 1960s. Professor Armand Leroi, who led the study on behalf of Imperial College, said: "They didn't make a revolution or spark a revolution, they joined one. The trend is already emerging and they rode that wave, which accounts for their incredible success." Beatles historian Mark Lewisohn said in response: "anyone who was a young person in the US when the Beatles arrived ... will tell you that the Beatles revolutionised everything." McCormick dismissed the study as "sensationalist". (Note: McCormick argued that the Beatles' sound was distinctive for taking "the energy of rock 'n' roll, the drive of rhythm and blues, harmonic shades of jazz, doo wop and soul and melodic elegance of the music hall and Broadway show tunes and formal pop of their childhoods" and combining these elements "into a seamless electric shock of sound that sparked a cultural revolution".)

== Personality and fashion ==
=== Attitude and sensibility ===
In the description of Rolling Stone's editors, the Beatles "defined and incarnated Sixties style: smart, idealistic, playful, irreverent, eclectic". They helped popularise Northern English accents on British radio and television, reversing the preference for BBC English, and their humour and irreverence combined to mock social conventions. Writer Sean O'Hagan recalled in 2016: "Everything about them – the clothes they wore, the way they spoke, the songs they created with an effortlessness that seemed almost alchemical – suggested new ways of being. More than any of their contemporaries, they challenged the tired conventions that defined class-bound, insular, early-60s Britain." According to author Jonathan Gould, in conveying "Youthfulness, stylishness, unpretentiousness, and nonchalance", their early image defied the widely held stereotype of Britishness, and through their presentation as Liverpudlians, "the Beatles personified an iconoclastic version of their national character that proved to be as compelling to the youth of North America, Europe, Australia and parts of Asia as it was to their British fans."

In his 1994 book Revolution in the Head, MacDonald describes the band members as "perfect McLuhanites" who "felt their way through life". He says of the group's initial impact:

Unlike previous pop stars – programmed to recite their future itineraries and favourite colours – The Beatles replied to the press in facetious ad-libs provoked by whatever was going on in the immediate present [...] Before them, pop acts had been neatly presented as soloists or well-drilled units each with its clearly identified leader. With their uncanny clone-like similarity and by all talking chattily at once, The Beatles introduced to the cultural lexicon several key Sixties motifs in one go: "mass"-ness, "working class" informality, cheery street scepticism, and – most challenging to the status quo – a simultaneity which subverted conventions of precedence in every way.

Lou Christie recalled that the Beatles' emergence underlined the staidness of the US music scene, saying: "We were, in many respects, just these goofy white boys. We weren't allowed to be seen with a cigarette in our hands [...] [The Beatles] were more aggressive, they were funny and they were articulate. The minute they came to America, they literally put a halt to everything that was previously happening."

=== Hair length and clothing ===
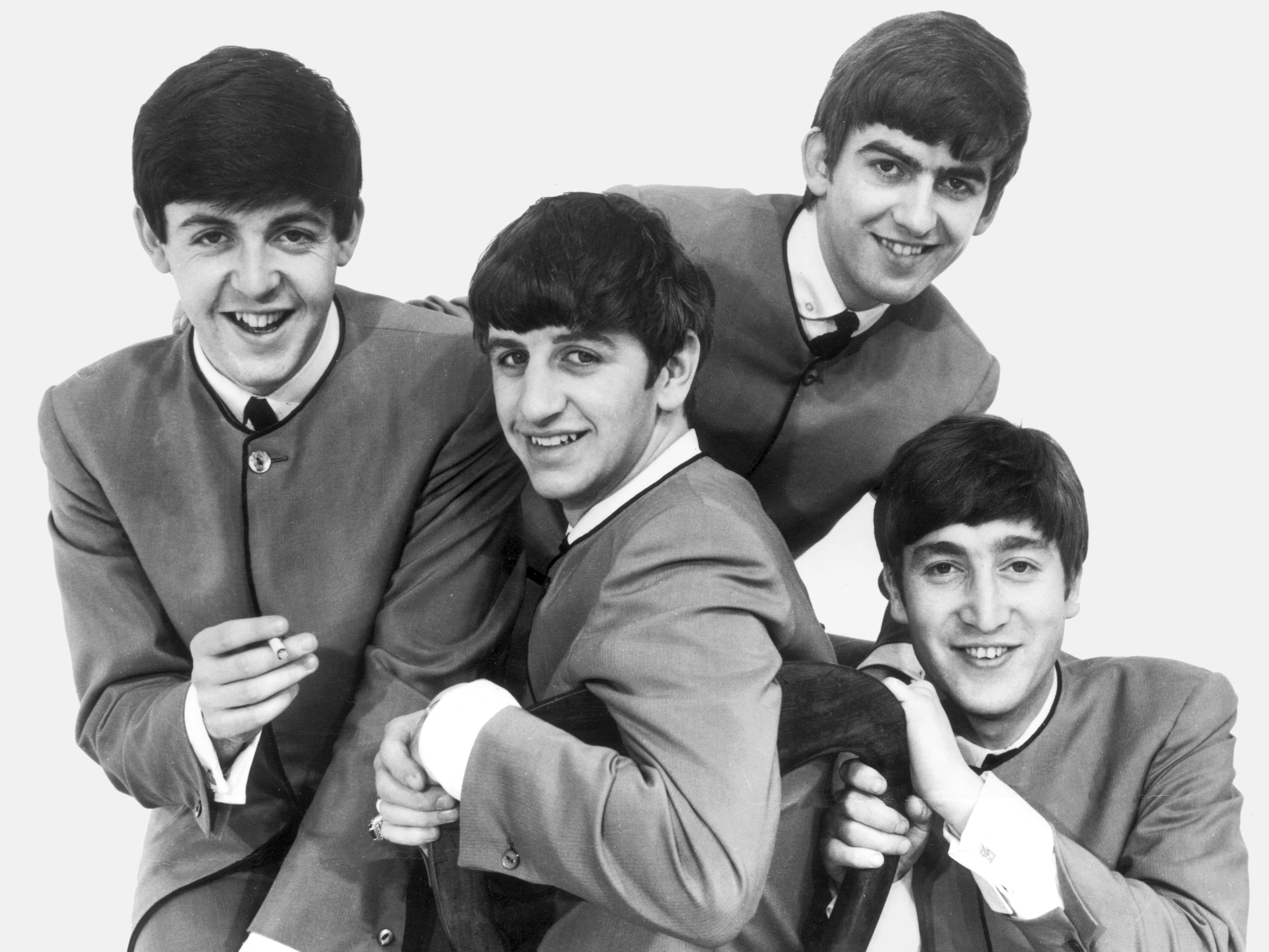
The "moptop" Beatles in 1963, wearing collarless Pierre Cardin suits

The Beatles' emergence coincided with a new consideration for the concept of male beauty and its elevation in importance beside feminine attractiveness. According to Marwick, the group's appearance and Kennedy's provided "the two great points of reference in this respect". The Beatles were dubbed "moptops" by some British tabloids in reference to their haircut, a mid-length hairstyle that was widely mocked by adults. It was unusually long for the era and became an emblem of rebellion to the burgeoning youth culture.

In their 1986 book Re-making Love: The Feminization of Sex, authors Barbara Ehrenreich, Elizabeth Hess and Gloria Jacobs said that the Beatles' haircuts signalled androgyny and thus presented a less threatening version of male sexuality to teenage girls, while their presentable suits meant they seemed less "sleazy" than Presley to middle-class whites.

Russian historian Mikhail Safonov wrote in 2003 that in the Brezhnev-era Soviet Union, mimicking the Beatles' hairstyle was seen as highly rebellious. Young people were called "hairies" by their elders, and would be stopped in the street and forced to have their hair cut in police stations.

As a result of the Beatles, the traditional American male look of crewcuts or combed-back hair was replaced by a preference for long hair.

Clothing styles were similarly influenced, firstly by the band's Pierre Cardin suits and Cuban-heeled Beatle boots, and later by the Carnaby Street mod fashions they wore. Along with the Rolling Stones, Dylan and the Who, the Beatles inspired thousands of young men to wear pop art-themed designs. In the late 1960s, the band's adoption of Nehru jackets and other Indian-style clothing was highly influential on Western fashion. In his 1970 "Lennon Remembers" interview, Lennon complained: "When we got here [to the US], you were all walking around in fuckin' Bermuda shorts with Boston crew cuts and stuff on your teeth [...] The chicks looked like 1940s horses. There was no conception of dress or any of that jazz." Writing in 2002, music journalist David Fricke said Lennon was "right" in his withering assessment of American youth, adding that Americans were "psychologically stuck in the surface white-bread calm of the 1950s" and "ripe for blindsiding".

The Chinese name for the Beatles (simplified Chinese: 披头士; traditional Chinese: 披頭士, Pītóushì in Modern Standard Mandarin), uses characters chosen to reflect the musicians' hairdos, with the first two characters referring to unruly hair; the first character alone refers to putting something on shoulders, or something done with hair.

=== Image and caricatures ===
As was so often pointed out in the mid-Sixties, the sum of the Beatles was greater than the parts, but the parts were so distinctive and attractive that the group itself could be all things to all people, more or less; you did not have to love them all to love the group, but you could not love one without loving the group, and this was why the Beatles became bigger than Elvis; this was what had never happened before.

— Music critic Greil Marcus

The Beatles differed from previous musical acts in their presentation as a group in which each of the individual personalities was seen as indispensable to the whole, and each member attracted fanatical devotion. According to cultural commentator Steven D. Stark, their lack of a designated leader aligned with a more typically feminine approach to collaboration, an aspect that increased their resonance among the female audience and subsequently influenced men's self-perception and cultural views on masculinity. The intensity of the Beatles' appeal as live performers was such that they were often presented with people who were physically impaired, in the assumption that the band had healing powers. When the band assumed a mystical image in the late 1960s, fans increasingly identified them as the four elements, in which each member presented a complementary and essential contribution to the alchemical whole.

In 1964, the Beatles starred in the film A Hard Day's Night as fictionalised versions of themselves, which created a lasting impression of their individual personas. Lennon became known as "the smart one", McCartney "the cute one", Harrison "the quiet one", and Starr "the lucky one". Starr's personality as the band's affable, self-deprecating drummer proved especially popular with fans and the press in the US. In 1964, as coverage of the Beatles matched that of the Johnson–Goldwater presidential race, Starr was the subject of bumper stickers proclaiming "Ringo for President", as well as several tribute songs. Teen fan magazines, such as 16 Magazines, DIG, Datebook, TeenScreen and, by 1965, TeenSet and Tiger Beat (along with many one-shots) also covered the Beatles to great lengths. TeenScreen promoted the Ringo For President Campaign, and 16 included articles entitles the Beatles and Me by Neil Aspinall, among many Beatles articles and images within the magazines — All of which heavily influenced the image and perception of the Beatles.

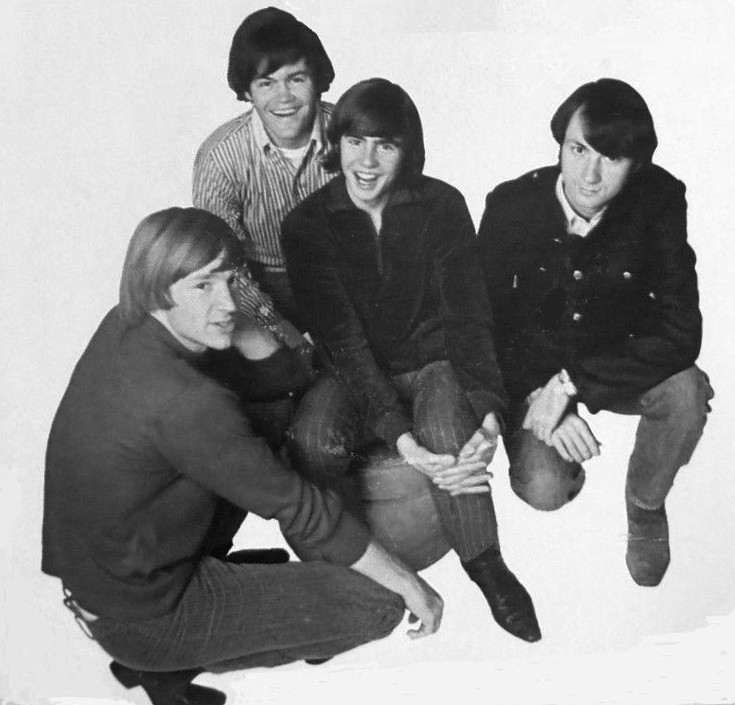
In 1966, in response to the Beatles' maturation beyond their initial teenybopper appeal, the Monkees were created as a television and recording act in their image.

Their Hard Day's Night characterizations were adopted again for the animated television series The Beatles, which was made by King Features and broadcast weekly on ABC in the US from September 1965 to April 1969. It was the first animated TV series to depict living people and featured the Beatles (voiced by actors) having adventures while touring the world. The series was highly successful, although its focus on the pre-1967 era ensured that audiences were presented with an increasingly outdated image of the band. (Note: The last episode of the show was produced in 1967. All subsequent broadcasts were reruns.)

Towards the end of 1966, by which point the Beatles' artistic maturity had left many younger listeners yearning for their innocent, "mop-top" image, the Monkees were assembled by a pair of Hollywood-based television executives as a four-piece band in the Beatles' mould. An immediate commercial success, the Monkees' self-titled television show evoked the Beatles' personalities from Dick Lester's feature films A Hard Day's Night and Help!, with the characters of the individual Monkees developed to reflect those of the Beatles. In Marwick's view, the Monkees' creation represented "the most remarkable sign of direct British influence" on American pop culture during the 1960s. At this time, the Beatles grew moustaches, a look that defied pop convention by implying maturation and artistry over youthfulness. Their appearance was the source of confusion for some of their young fans. A Daily Mail writer complained that after emerging as "heroes of a social revolution" in 1963 and "the boys whom everybody could identify with", the Beatles had become austere and exclusive.

The producers of the 1967 Disney animated film The Jungle Book hoped to include the Beatles in a scene featuring four vultures with mop-top hairstyles singing "That's What Friends Are For". After the band declined to take part, the scene was voiced by actors adopting Liverpudlian accents and the song was given a barbershop quartet arrangement.

=== Merchandise ===
Along with Beatles-themed wallpaper and jewellery, "Beatles wigs" were popular and widely available in UK stores from 1963. In the US, their merchandise was extensive, and marketed through Seltaeb, a local subsidiary of a company owned by Epstein's NEMS Enterprises. Among what Schaffner estimated to be "several hundred" items authorised by Seltaeb were toys, clothing, stationery, alarm clocks, pillowcases, bath products, junk food and lunchboxes, while Beatles wigs "became the best-selling novelty since yo-yo's". Beatles-brand chewing gum alone netted millions of dollars in the US. Beatle boots were also sanctioned as official merchandise by NEMS.

According to Doggett, while Presley's image had similarly been exploited, "the onslaught of ephemeral artefacts aimed at Beatles fans between 1963 and 1969 dwarfed every previous campaign." The commercial exploitation extended to novelty records such as The Chipmunks Sing the Beatles Hits and an early version of a Beatles karaoke disc. King Features' The Beatles led to a range of cartoon-style products and marketing by companies such as Nestlé, with their "Beatles' Yeah Yeah Yeah" confectionery, and Lux soap. A major merchandising campaign accompanied the release of the band's 1968 animated film Yellow Submarine, containing products that captured their psychedelic look.

== Popular music and artistry ==
=== Artistic presentation ===
The Beatles introduced new methods of artistic presentation for pop musicians. They were the first band to be fully marketed through television and continued to find new ways to disseminate their music through the medium. As live performers, they pioneered the world tour and stadium concerts, as sports stadiums became the primary venues for rock tours. Gould says that, aside from their influence on pop songwriting, the Beatles played "a leading role in revolutionizing the way that popular records were made, the way that popular records were listened to ... and the role that popular music itself would play in people's lives".

The band's achievements were a key factor in the music industry becoming a multi-million-dollar enterprise and one that approached Hollywood film-making in terms of worldwide influence and turnover. In 1965, the Beatles' music publishing company Northern Songs was floated on the London Stock Exchange, a move that was unprecedented for a band's song catalogue. The flotation defied analysts' predictions by becoming a major financial success.

=== Songwriting ===
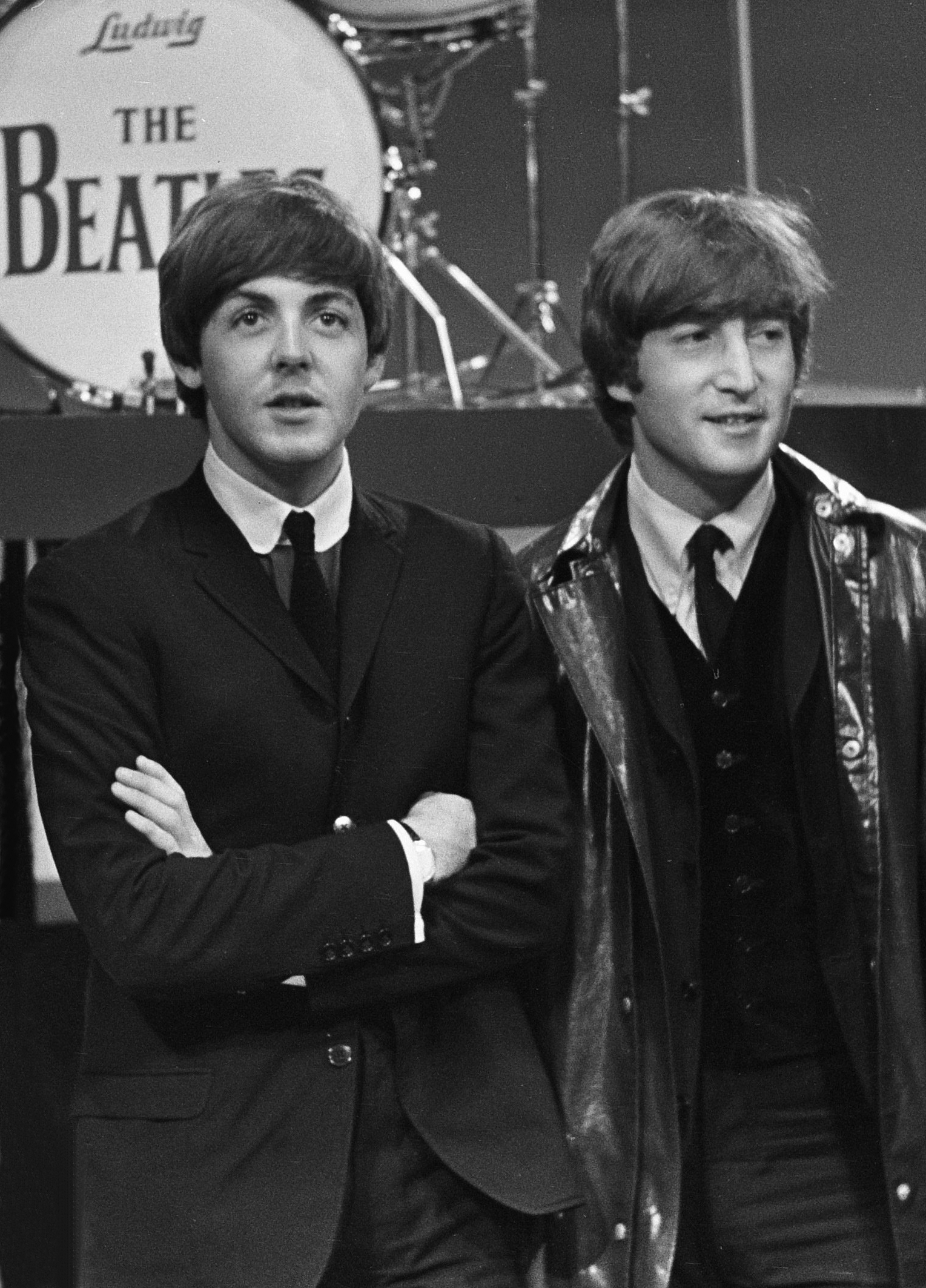
Paul McCartney and John Lennon, the principal songwriters of the Beatles

Through the Beatles' early success, the Lennon–McCartney partnership revolutionised songwriting in Britain by usurping the Denmark Street tradition of in-house songwriters. In the US, they similarly inspired changes to the music industry, as did the British Invasion songwriters they influenced, by combining the roles of writer and performer. This trend threatened the Brill Building writers and other professional songwriters that dominated the American music industry. (Note: Ellie Greenwich, a Brill Building songwriter, said: "When the Beatles and the entire British Invasion came in, we were all ready to say, 'Look, it's been nice, there's no more room for us … It's now the self-contained group – males, certain type of material. What do we do?'") According to Rolling Stone's editors, the Beatles thereby "inaugurated the era of self-contained bands and forever centralized pop". Lennon and McCartney also supplied hit songs for several other artists up to 1966, including Cilla Black, Billy J. Kramer, the Fourmost and the Rolling Stones, and they opened up opportunities in the US that were previously unavailable for non-performing British songwriters, such as Tony Hatch. Direct collaboration between Lennon and McCartney was limited from 1964, but their songs continued to be credited to the partnership.

From 1963 to 1967, the Beatles increasingly broke with established rock and pop conventions. Adding to their sophistication as composers was the application of modal mixture, wider chord palettes, and extended form. One of the hallmarks of the Beatles' experimental period is their use of the flattened subtonic chord (♭VII). Although it was already a staple of rock 'n' roll, the Beatles further developed and popularised the chord's function in popular music. Another is their subversions of pop's standard AABA form. Few electric beat artists wrote songs with bridge sections until the group's breakthrough, after which the practice became ubiquitous.

MacDonald describes Lennon and McCartney's growing articulacy and ambition from 1962 to 1967 as "quite vertiginous" and says that, with Harrison and Starr's collaboration in the recording studio, they "led a revolution in the very ethos of songwriting which consisted in seeing the song as a part of something larger: the record". Luhrssen and Larson describe the pair's songwriting as "more melodically and harmonically unpredictable than that of their peers", and say that the Beatles' sound "struck many ears as outrageous, especially the falsetto leaps in songs such as 'She Loves You,' which might have been inspired by Little Richard but sounded unprecedented".

The opening chord from "A Hard Day's Night" (1964)
The introductory chord to "A Hard Day's Night" inspired much analysis and debate among music writers.

"A Hard Day's Night", written primarily by Lennon, begins with a ringing chord most commonly identified as G7sus4. The specifics of its harmonic construction are often scrutinised, with many writers offering different interpretations of the chord. In 2001, Rolling Stone referred to the "Hard Day's Night" chord as the most famous in rock history. Another chord described as among the "most famous" in history is the sustained E major heard at the end of "A Day in the Life" from Sgt. Pepper.

Principally through McCartney's melody writing, the Beatles created many songs that became the most widely recorded of all time, including "And I Love Her", "Yesterday", "Michelle", "Eleanor Rigby", "Here, There and Everywhere", "The Fool on the Hill", "Hey Jude", "Blackbird", "Let It Be" and "The Long and Winding Road". According to Doggett, these mainly McCartney-written songs provided contemporary relevance for "light orchestras and crooners" in the easy listening category, persuaded adults that the new generation's musical tastes had merit, and "ensured that Lennon and McCartney would become the highest-earning composers in history". Harrison's songwriting widened the Beatles' range further, although his level of contribution remained limited by Lennon and McCartney's dominance throughout the band's career. His song "Something" was also widely covered, and earned rare praise from Sinatra, who described it as "the greatest love song of the past fifty years".

=== Growth of rock bands and expansion of pop music ===
Music journalist Mark Kemp credits the Beatles with leading pop music's expansion into styles such as world music, psychedelia, avant-pop and electronica, and attracting a bohemian audience that had previously focused on jazz and folk. According to Luhrssen and Larson, the Beatles affected every genre of rock music except jazz rock. According to Gould, the Beatles served as the "archetype" of a rock band, in contrast to the vocal and harmony groups with which listeners were most familiar in 1964. In the US, thousands of bands sought to imitate the Beatles, some adopting English-sounding names to capitalise on the British Invasion. According to author Carl Caferelli, the Beatles embodied the "pop band" ideal and, while the Who have been credited for heralding the power pop genre, "the story really begins circa 1964, with the commercial ascension of the Beatles in America."

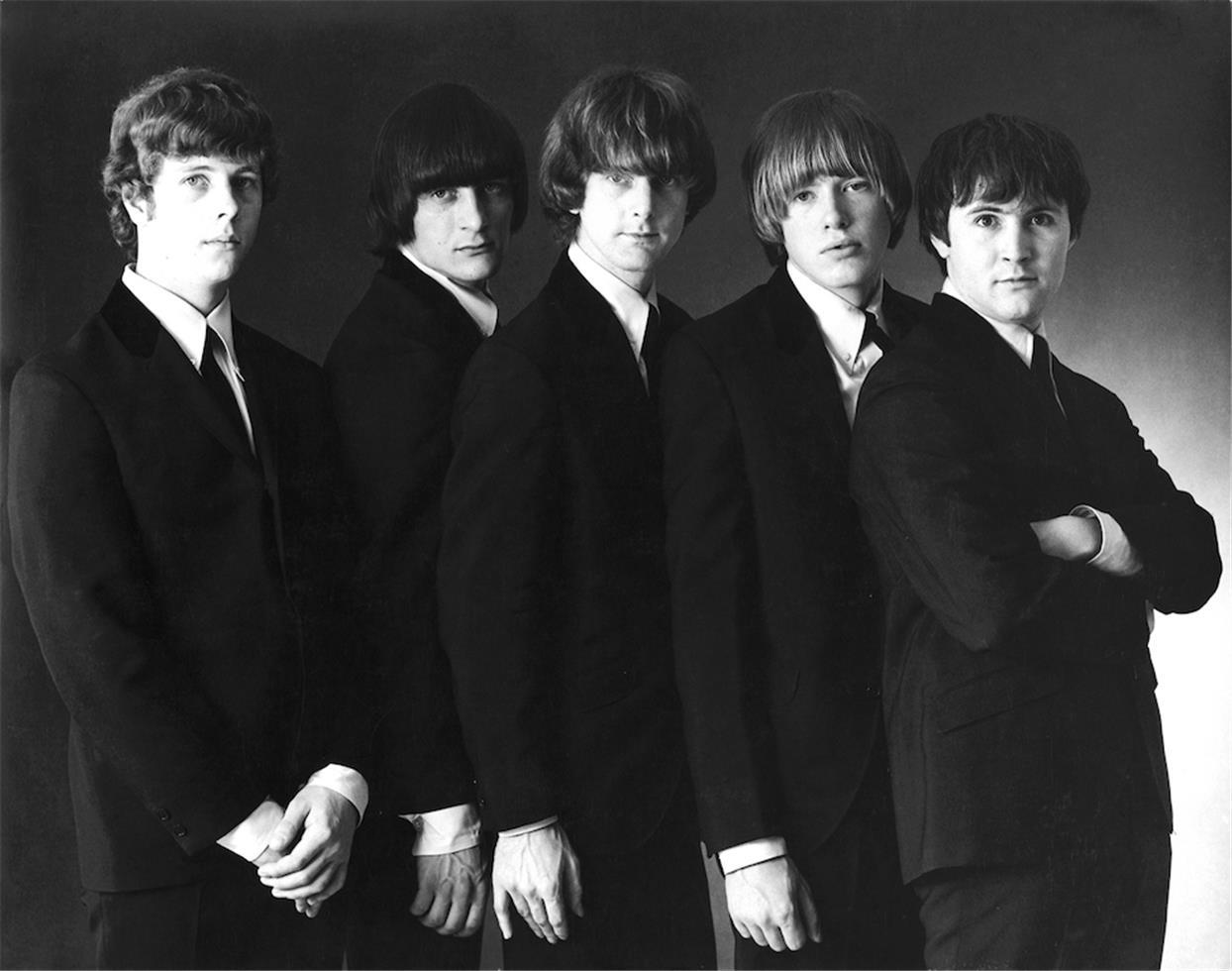
The Byrds were among thousands of rock groups that formed in the wake of the Beatles' U.S. emergence

While the country already had a vibrant garage rock scene, the movement surged following the Beatles' first appearance on The Ed Sullivan Show. Commentator Bill Dean writes that the exact figures are impossible to determine, but "the anecdotal evidence suggests thousands – if not hundreds of thousands or even more – young musicians across the country" responded by forming bands. This was sometimes to the chagrin of their parents and other adults. Tom Petty, who joined the Sundowners in Gainesville, Florida, after seeing the Beatles' US television debut, recalled: "Within weeks of that, you could drive through literally any neighborhood in Gainesville and you would hear the strains of garage bands playing ... I mean everywhere. And I'd say by a year from that time, Gainesville probably had 50 bands." The Byrds and Creedence Clearwater Revival are among the American groups said to have formed as a result of the show. Accompanying this phenomenon, the musicians typically abandoned their crewcut look and allowed their hair to grow. Joe Walsh, Nancy Wilson and Billy Joel also credited the show as the impetus for them to pursue musical careers.

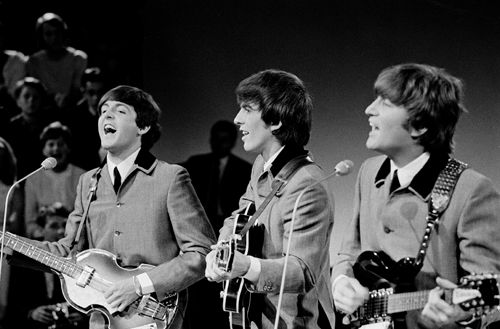
The Beatles performing on Dutch television during the 1964 world tour

The proliferation of new groups was evident in many other countries. In Spain, Los Estudiantes and Los Brincos modelled themselves on the Beatles, as did the Uruguayan band Los Shakers, who were one of many groups around the world that formed as a result of A Hard Day's Night. Following the Beatles' concerts there on the 1964 world tour, new bands sprung up in Australia, New Zealand and Hong Kong, while some existing acts, such as the Bee Gees, instantly changed their style to match the Beatles'.

The Daily Express reported in 1965 that a band known as the Candid Lads had started in the Soviet Union, with a sound and look identical to the Beatles'. Bands there were forced to play in secret due to the communist authorities' ban on rock music, and Beatles records had to be smuggled into the country, although contrary to popular conception, it was not impossible to listen to their music. Russian musician Sasha Lipnitsky later recalled: "The Beatles brought us the idea of democracy ... For many of us, it was the first hole in the Iron Curtain." In Japan, the Beatles influenced what was dubbed the "Group Sounds" era, before which Japanese bands were mainly imitations of acts such as Presley and Pat Boone. According to music-industry executive Aki Tanaka, the Beatles' 1966 concerts in Tokyo inspired "the birth of a real Japanese rock music scene", in which local artists wrote their material rather than merely covering Western rock songs.

=== Competition ===
Before the mid-1960s, competition between popular recording artists was typically measured by popularity and record sales, with artistic rivalries usually only occurring between jazz or classical musicians. Comparing its effect on 1960s popular music to Charlie Chaplin's on 1920s filmmaking, Gould credits the Beatles' increasing ambition "to write better songs" with inspiring "intense creative rivalries" between themselves and other acts who "felt a need to validate their success by experimenting with songwriting and record-making in ways that would have seemed unimaginable only a few years before." Author Robert Rodriguez writes that "The Beatles, Dylan, and the Rolling Stones have long been viewed as the Holy Trinity of 1960s rock, from whom every important development and innovation flowed." Author Carys Wyn Jones states that the "competition, interaction, and influence" between those acts (plus the Beach Boys) became "central to histories of rock". The Byrds also figured highly in their importance, to the extent that they were widely celebrated as the American answer to the Beatles. (Note: While their long-term influence has proven to be comparable to the Beatles and the Beach Boys, the Byrds' record sales totaled considerably less.)

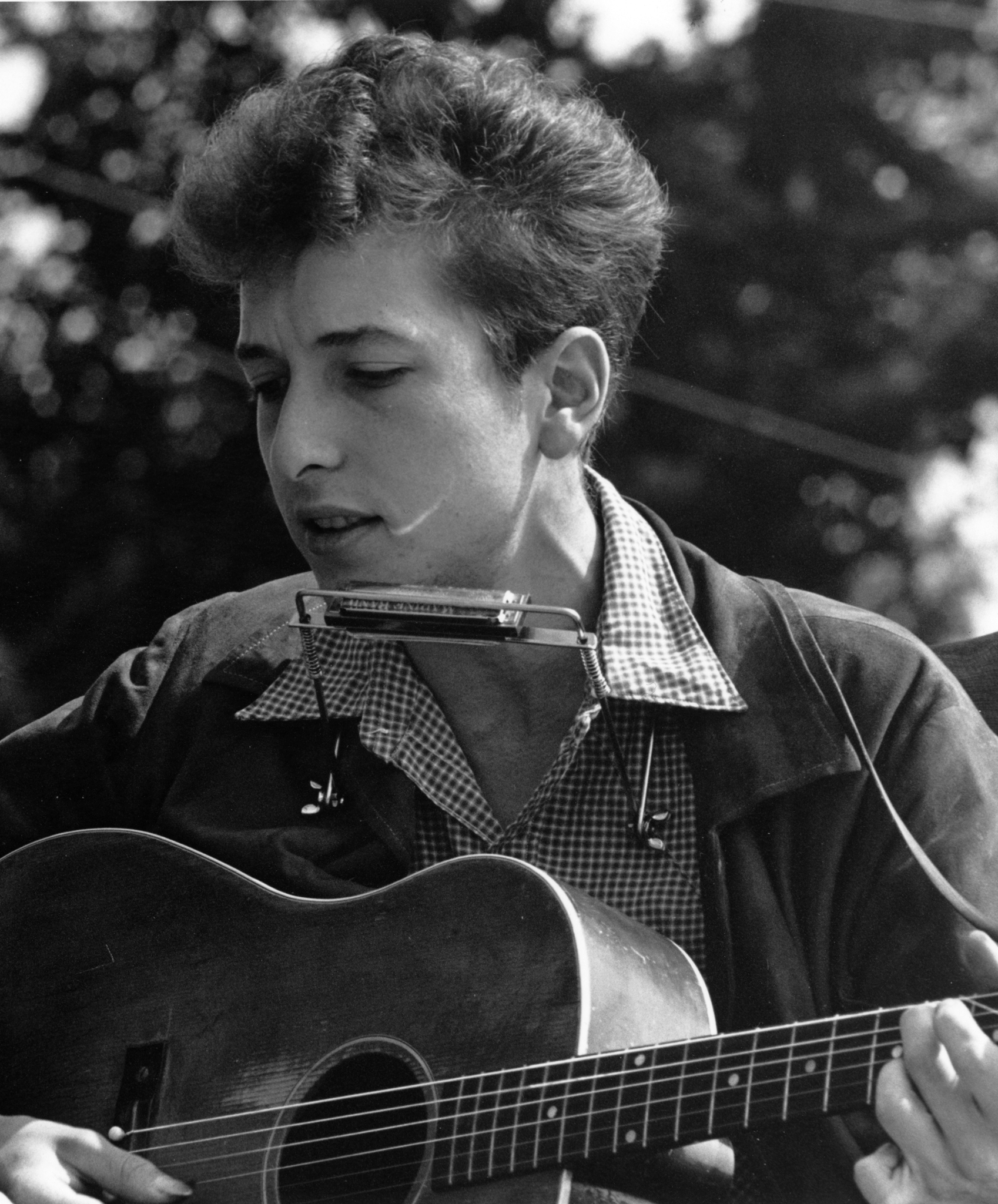
Bob Dylan, 1963

Bob Dylan and the Rolling Stones were symbolic of the nascent youth revolt against institutional authority, something that was not immediately recognisable within the Beatles until 1966. The Beatles' initial clean-cut personas contrasted with the Rolling Stones' "bad boy" image, and so the music press forged a rivalry between the two acts. (Note: Throughout Britpop's peak in the 1990s, comparisons were often drawn between the Beatles–Stones rivalry and the rivalry of the bands Oasis and Blur.) From 1964 onwards, the Beatles and Dylan partook in a mutual dialogue and exchange of ideas. Their engagement is referred to by Chris Smith, author of 101 Albums That Changed Popular Music, as the "single phenomenon that defined the tone of 1960s popular music and the future of music in America".

In August 1964, at the Delmonico Hotel in New York City, the Beatles met Dylan in person and were introduced to cannabis. Many commentators have referenced this meeting as a cultural turning point. Gould explains that, before then, the musicians' respective fanbases were "perceived as inhabiting two separate subcultural worlds": Dylan's audience of "college kids with artistic or intellectual leanings, a dawning political and social idealism, and a mildly bohemian style" contrasted with their fans, "veritable 'teenyboppers' – kids in high school or grade school whose lives were totally wrapped up in the commercialised popular culture of television, radio, pop records, fan magazines, and teen fashion. They were seen as idolaters, not idealists." He writes that within a year of the Beatles' first meeting with Dylan, "the distinctions between the folk and rock audiences would have nearly evaporated", as the Beatles' fanbase began to grow in sophistication and Dylan's audience re-engaged with adolescent concerns presented in the "newly energized and autonomous pop culture". (Note: Rock journalist Al Aronowitz, who brokered the meeting, said that "Until the advent of rap, pop music remained largely derivative of that night at the Delmonico.")

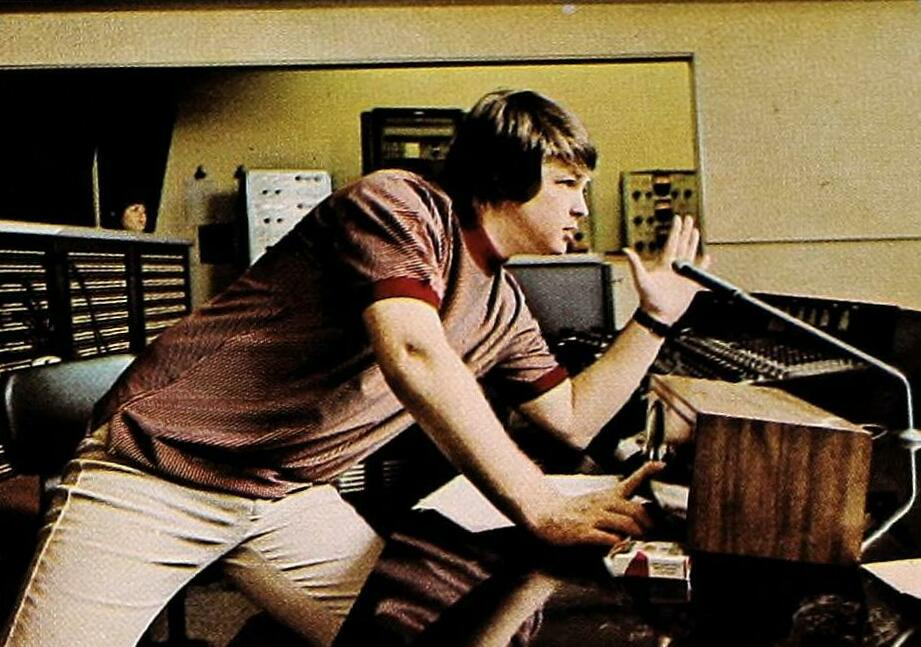
Beach Boys bandleader Brian Wilson became the Beatles' chief creative rival in the mid-1960s

In July 1966, Dylan suffered a motorcycle accident and spent a period in convalescence, and principally for McCartney, Brian Wilson of the Beach Boys subsequently took his place as the Beatles' chief artistic rival. The two bands inspired and endeavoured to top each other with their artistry and recording techniques, but the Beach Boys failed to maintain their career momentum after 1967. According to Jones, the interplay between the two bands during the Pet Sounds era remains one of the most noteworthy episodes in rock history. (Note: In 2003, when Rolling Stone created its list of the 500 Greatest Albums of All Time, the top 10 included four Beatles albums, one Beach Boys album, and one Rolling Stones album. Pet Sounds was ranked second explicitly to honour its influence on the highest ranked album, Sgt. Pepper's.)

=== Cultural legitimisation of pop music ===
In Britain, music journalists started including pop and rock music in serious discussion as a direct consequence of the Beatles' 1964 breakthrough. Pop gained its first exposure in the arts section of one of the country's broadsheet newspapers when William Mann, The Times's classical music critic, wrote an appreciation of the Beatles in December 1963. In the United States, the Beatles were the main beneficiaries of a new widespread appreciation for pop and rock over 1966–67 among journalists and intellectuals, coinciding with the emergence there of a dedicated rock press and serious coverage of the genre in the cultural mainstream. Music critic Tim Riley identifies the Beatles as pop music's "first recording artists", whose body of work represents "very intricate art". Luhrssen and Larson say the Beatles "[made] it mandatory that serious rock bands aspire to be artists, not merely entertainers".

With A Hard Day's Night in July 1964, the band became the first pop act since Buddy Holly to issue an album consisting entirely of original compositions. The accompanying feature film endeared the Beatles to intellectuals in Britain. Lennon's artistic standing was furthered by the critical and commercial success of his book of prose In His Own Write and its 1965 sequel, A Spaniard in the Works. Now feted by London society, Lennon and McCartney found inspiration among a network of non-mainstream writers, poets, comedians, film-makers and other arts-related individuals. According to Doggett, their social milieu in 1964 represented "new territory for pop" and a challenge to British class delineation as the Beatles introduced an "arty middle-class" sensibility to pop music. The albums Beatles for Sale and Help! (issued in December 1964 and August 1965, respectively) each marked a progression in the band's development, in terms of lyrical content and recording sophistication. With Help!, the Beatles became the first rock group to be nominated for a Grammy Award for Album of the Year. The contemperaneous art pop movement is often traced to the Beatles' first recording with a string quartet ("Yesterday") in conjunction with the group's mid-1960s contemporaries.

Recording for Rubber Soul took place over a four-week period uninterrupted by touring, filming or radio engagements, making its creation highly unusual for the time. By the time of the album's release in December 1965, according to author Michael Frontani, each new Beatles record was received as "an expansion of the parameters of popular music, and the [group's] image reflected and promoted notions of the Beatles' artistry and importance". Simonelli describes Rubber Soul as "the first serious effort by a rock and roll act to produce an LP as an artistic statement", while author Christopher Bray deems it "the first long-playing pop record to really merit the term 'album'" and the LP that "turned pop music into high art". The standard of its all-original compositions was also responsible for a widespread shift in focus from singles to creating albums without the usual filler tracks.

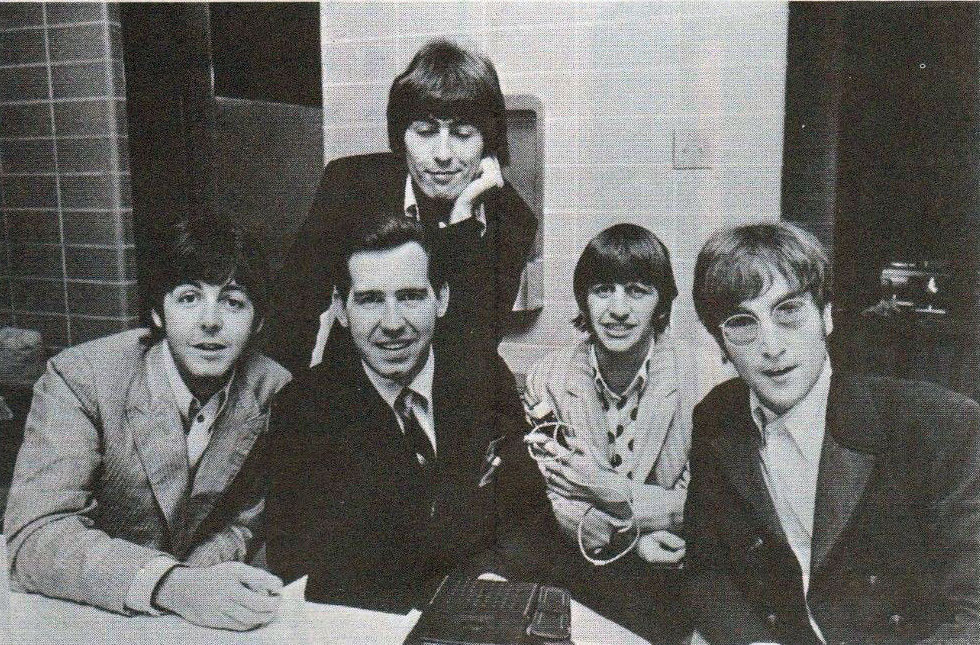
The group, with Chicago disc jockey Jim Stagg (front row, second from left), around the time of Revolver's release in August 1966

The Beatles incorporated influences from the English counterculture (or London underground) more readily than any of their pop rivals. Led by McCartney's absorption in the London arts scene and interest in the work of Stockhausen and Bach, this resulted in what musicologist Walter Everett terms a "revolution in the expressive capacity of mainstream rock music". The band's August 1966 album Revolver was viewed as avant-garde and, in MacDonald's description, "initiated a second pop revolution ... galvanising their existing rivals and inspiring many new ones". According to music historian Simon Philo, Revolver announced "underground London"'s arrival in pop, supplanting the sound associated with Swinging London.

Released in May 1967, Sgt. Pepper's Lonely Hearts Club Band is described by Doggett as "the biggest pop happening" to take place between the Beatles' debut on American television in February 1964 and Lennon's murder in December 1980. The album was a major critical and commercial success; through the level of attention it received from the rock press and more culturally elite publications, Sgt. Pepper achieved full cultural legitimisation for pop music and recognition for the medium as a genuine art form. Its win in the Album of the Year category at the 1968 Grammys Awards marked the first time that a rock LP had received this award. According to author Doyle Greene, the album provided "a crucial locus in the assemblage of popular music and avant-garde/experimental music – and popular culture and modernism". Chris Smith highlights Sgt. Pepper as one of the most "obvious" choices for inclusion in 101 Albums That Changed Popular Music, due to its continued commercial success, the wealth of imitative works it inspired, and its ongoing recognition as "a defining moment in the history of music".

The Beatles represented a diverse collection of musical styles that one critic likened to a history of Western music, and its November 1968 release was viewed as a major cultural event. The album failed to inspire the level of creative writing that Sgt. Pepper had introduced to rock criticism, as reviewers were unable to locate it within the Beatles' canon. Music critic John Harris wrote of the White Album: "it was these 30 songs that decisively opened the way for musicians to extend their horizons beyond the standard LP format."

== Jangle, folk, country-rock, and rock 'n' roll revival ==
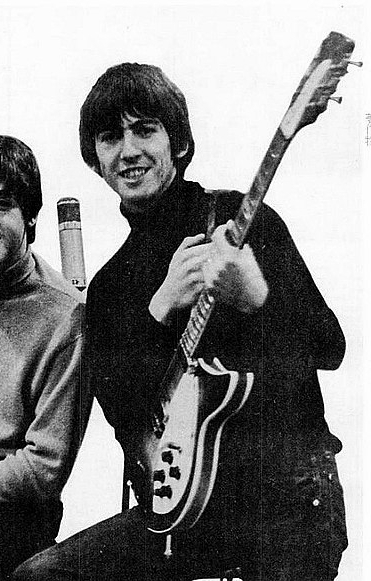
Harrison with his Rickenbacker 360/12, 1965

Together with the Byrds, the Beatles are commonly credited with launching the popularity of the "jangly" sound that defined jangle pop. Harrison was one of the first people to own a Rickenbacker 360/12, an electric guitar with twelve strings. (Note: The Rickenbacker is unique among twelve-string guitars in having the lower octave string of each of the first four pairs placed above the higher tuned string. This, and the naturally rich harmonics produced by a twelve-string guitar provided the distinctive overtones found on many of the Beatles' recordings.) His use of this guitar during the recording of A Hard Day's Night helped to popularise the model, and the jangly sound became so prominent that Melody Maker termed it the Beatles' "secret weapon". Roger McGuinn liked the effect so much that he made it his signature guitar sound with the Byrds.

Within a year of their 1964 meeting, the Beatles and Dylan adopted elements of each other's respective genres, rock and folk, into their music. Both acts became a significant influence on the folk rock movement that followed in 1965. In Jackson's view, it was Harrison's twelve-string arpeggios at the end of the Beatles' July 1964 single, "A Hard Day's Night", that "birthed" the folk-rock sound. Dubbed for the Byrds' debut single, a cover of Dylan's "Mr. Tambourine Man", the term "folk rock" referred to "Dylanesque lyrics combined with rock rhythm and Beatlesque harmonies". In response to the Byrds, the Beatles developed the jangle-pop sound of folk rock with the treble-heavy guitars on the Rubber Soul tracks "If I Needed Someone" and "Nowhere Man". Gould describes the altered US edition of Rubber Soul as the release that encouraged "legions of folk-music enthusiasts" to embrace pop. According to The Encyclopedia of Country Music, building on the Beatles for Sale track "I Don't Want to Spoil the Party", Rubber Soul was as an early example of country rock, anticipating the Byrds' 1968 album Sweetheart of the Rodeo.

The Beatles' March 1968 single "Lady Madonna" was at the forefront of a contemporary rock 'n' roll revival, which marked the end of the psychedelic era. In the song, McCartney sought to create a boogie-woogie piece in the style of Fats Domino. Harris says that in addition to anticipating similar revival recordings by the Rolling Stones and Eric Clapton, "Lady Madonna" ensured that Berry and Little Richard returned to "the rarified pedestals where the British Invasion groups had originally placed them".

== Generational awareness ==
The '60s saw a revolution ... in a whole way of thinking. The Beatles were part of the revolution, which is really an evolution, and is continuing. We were all on this ship – a ship going to discover the New World. And the Beatles were in the crow's nest.

— John Lennon, 1974

From 1963, the Beatles provided one of the first opportunities for female teenagers to exhibit spending power and publicly express sexual desire, while the group's image suggested a disregard for adults' opinions and parents' ideas of morality. Simonelli writes of the Beatles' emergence and its impact on 1960s youth: "British young people experimented with music, art, politics, sexual morality, fashion and the like, and the rest of the Western world watched, absorbed the changes and contributed to the process." The band's sociocultural impact in the US began with their February 1964 visit, which served as a key moment in the development of generational awareness. Writing that same month, American sociologist David Riesman said the Beatles' success was "a form of protest against the adult world"; later in 1964, The New York Times Magazine described Beatlemania as a "religion of teenage culture" that was indicative of how American youth now looked to their own age group for social values and role models. According to historian Michael James Roberts, even though their early songs avoided such issues, the band represented "cultural change and the oppositional stance of the youth culture against the establishment".

The group's popularity subsequently grew into what was seen as an embodiment of sociocultural movements of the decade, and their artistic maturation reflected the era's social developments. They were widely viewed as leaders of the youth culture and such a sentiment was echoed by the mainstream press. Their 1966 songs "Paperback Writer", "Rain", "Taxman" and "Eleanor Rigby" provided social commentary, with the lyrics of "Rain" making explicit the delineation between the socially aware and those who were not. By contrast, Sgt. Pepper achieved a cross-generational appeal; in "She's Leaving Home", McCartney and Lennon sang of a real-life teenage runaway but gave an unusually sympathetic perspective on the parents' sense of loss.

According to Stark, the social unity conveyed by the Beatles from the start of their career inspired the framework for the collectivist thinking that distinguished the 1960s and the emergence of the counterculture movement. He sees their English sense of humour as a defining trait of the counterculture and an inspiration for Yippie activists Abbie Hoffman and Jerry Rubin. Gould similarly writes that, from the band's arrival in the US, teenagers were aware of the "social dimension" implicit in the group's camaraderie, matching clothes and hair, and ensemble playing. In Gould's view, as icons of the 1960s counterculture, the band became a catalyst for bohemianism and activism in various social and political arenas, fuelling movements such as women's liberation, gay liberation and environmentalism. (Note: Ehrenreich, Hess and Jacobs comment that, but for the girls' hairstyles and clothing, the photos and footage of young Beatles fans in confrontation with police suggest a women's liberation demonstration from the late 1960s rather than a 1964 pop event. The authors add: "Yet if it was not the 'movement,' or a clear-cut protest of any kind, Beatlemania was the first mass outburst of the '60s to feature women – in this case girls, who would not reach full adulthood until the '70s – and the emergence of a genuinely political movement for women's liberation.")

According to documentary filmmaker Leslie Woodhead, a former Cold War spy, the Beatles' music helped persuade young Russians to defy communist ideology and begin the process that led to the fall of communism throughout Eastern Europe. He said the extent of the band's influence became apparent in the 1990s when local rock musicians told him that "not only were the Beatles colossal from the Berlin Wall to Vladivostok but that they'd played a really significant part in helping to wash away totalitarianism ... They liberated a certain spiritual energy so that two generations of Soviet kids simply gave up on building socialism and started to realise that the Cold War enemy, instead of being a threat, made wonderful music." Many young Russians learnt to speak English through the Beatles' lyrics, and the band's songs helped spread the English language throughout Europe and the rest of the world.

== Civil rights and support for African-American musicians ==
The Beatles' US breakthrough coincided with the passing of the Civil Rights Act later that year. Marwick writes that while American folk singers Dylan and Joan Baez were more identifiable with civil rights issues, in Beatles songs, "it was a case of music and lyrics together constructing – constantly changing – moods which never failed, it seemed, to evoke responses in large numbers of listeners of the day." According to Moore, the Beatles and the British Invasion bands that followed them to the US initiated the process whereby Americans "gradually encountered and accepted the return of their black heritage". (Note: Their first US LP, Introducing ... The Beatles, was released by the African-American–owned label Vee-Jay Records. Through the album's preponderance of cover versions of recordings by black R&B artists, Roberts writes, the Beatles introduced this music to a new audience of white Americans and helped to "relegitimate" an aspect of African-American musical history.)

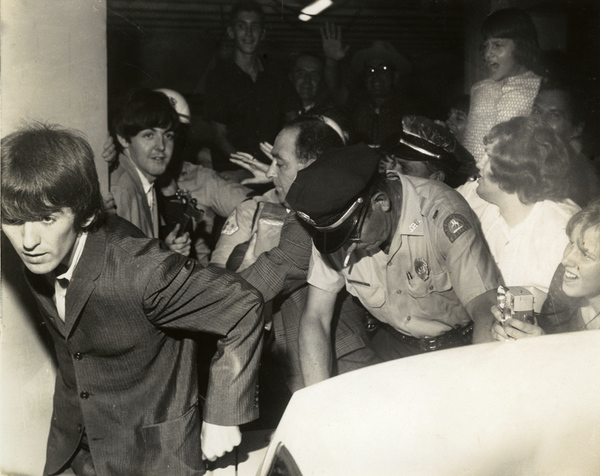
George Harrison and McCartney being escorted through fans before the Beatles performed at the Gator Bowl in Jacksonville, Florida

During the Beatles' US tour in August–September 1964, the group spoke out against racial segregation in the country at the time, particularly in the South. When informed that the venue for their 11 September concert, the Gator Bowl in Jacksonville, Florida, was segregated, the Beatles said they would refuse to perform unless the audience was integrated. City officials relented and agreed to allow an integrated show. Although the group held their press conference there before the concert, they cancelled their reservations at the whites-only Hotel George Washington in Jacksonville. According to music journalist Bill DeMain, the Beatles' stand "gave pop music a new-found social conscience"; American singer Brian Hyland recalled of the episode: "They were really the first group to have the power to do that. They used that platform really well ... It took a lot of courage."

Additionally on the tour, the band repeatedly voiced their admiration of Little Richard, Chuck Berry and Fats Domino, and particularly soul artists such as the Miracles, Marvin Gaye and Chuck Jackson. Miracles leader Smokey Robinson said he was especially grateful for the Beatles' championing of Motown music and their choosing to cover songs by Motown artists. He added that they "were the first white artists to ever admit that they grew up and honed themselves on black music. I loved the fact that they did that, that they were honest".

The Beatles subsequently invited Mary Wells to be their support act on a UK tour and in 1965 arranged for Esther Phillips to give her first performances outside the US. According to Lewisohn, documents reveal that for their tours in 1965 and 1966, the Beatles included clauses in contracts stipulating that shows be integrated. In 1966, McCartney said they had avoided performing in South Africa "or any places where blacks would be separated", adding, "It wasn't out of any goody-goody thing; we just thought, 'Why should you separate black people from white?'" (Note: Although he has given alternative sources of inspiration for the song, McCartney said he wrote "Blackbird" in response to racial tensions escalating in the US during the spring of 1968.)

== Opposition from conservatives ==
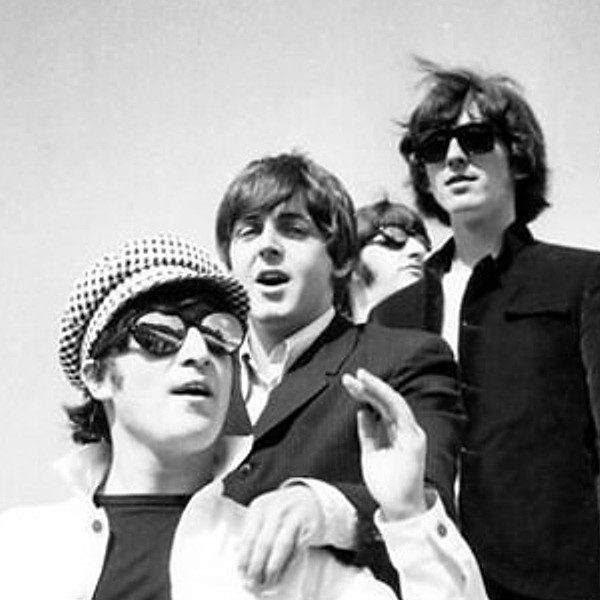
The Beatles arriving for concerts in Madrid, July 1965

The Beatles were widely condemned by conservative elements of society, as Presley and other symbols of rock and roll had been during the 1950s. Israel refused to let the band perform there in early 1964, wary of "attacks of mass hysteria" being inflicted on the country's youth. In August 1965, the Indonesian government burned the group's records in order to "preserve the national identity in the field of culture" as part of that country's twentieth anniversary celebrations of independence. In East Germany, the Beatles were blamed for a "cultural crisis" that saw artists and intellectuals pushing for more leniency from the state; by April 1966, however, the government were supportive of the Beatles and instead targeted the Rolling Stones.

The US Labor Department attempted to ban the Beatles from performing in the country, motivated by cultural conservatism and after lobbying from the American Federation of Musicians. The government sought to ban all British acts in 1965, but the financial opportunities presented by the Beatles ensured that their second North American tour went ahead. From that year onwards, right-wing Christian leaders such as Bob Larson and David Noebel were vocal in their condemnation of the Beatles' influence in the US. As a spokesman for the anti-communist Christian Crusade, Noebel denounced the band as "four mop-headed anti-Christ beatniks", and published pamphlets warning that they were destroying the morals of America's youth to facilitate a communist takeover orchestrated from Moscow. (Note: Following the release of the Sgt. Pepper album in 1967, some American fans and parents thought the Beatles were part of a communist plot because they could not believe that the band were capable of creating music of such a high standard.) By contrast, Pravda, the official newspaper of the Communist Party of the Soviet Union, said the Beatles represented "a plot by the ruling classes to distract ... youngsters from politics and bitter pondering over disgraced and shattered hopes".

In the UK, criticism largely faded with the band's international breakthrough, as commentators recognised the Beatles' value to the economy. Some traditionalists were nevertheless outraged by the group being awarded MBEs, and the Beatles, as with rock music in general, remained the target of figures such as Daily Mail columnist Monica Furlong and conservative activist Mary Whitehouse. In 1967, Whitehouse campaigned against the lyric "Boy, you've been a naughty girl, you let your knickers down" in the Beatles' song "I Am the Walrus" after the BBC had aired the song as part of the band's TV film Magical Mystery Tour. The BBC duly banned the song. The following year, Lennon's relationship with Japanese avant-garde artist Yoko Ono, for whom he abandoned his wife and son, was met with strong public disapproval and racial abuse. Lennon received further condemnation from conservatives when he returned his MBE to the Queen in November 1969. He cited his opposition to the British government's support of both US involvement in the Vietnam War and Nigeria's role in the Biafra conflict, in addition to the poor chart performance of his and Ono's second Plastic Ono Band single, "Cold Turkey".

=== Budokan, Manila and "Jesus" controversies ===
The polarity had flipped from positive to negative [in 1966]. In Japan, Manila and America, they seemed to have become a lightning rod for all sorts of tensions – the penetration of Western culture into previously untouched markets, the decline of religion in the face of pluralistic consumerism ... They were also a target for all those who resisted the pace of change.

— Author Jon Savage

The Japanese authorities viewed the band as subversive before they were appointed as MBEs in 1965. In the lead-up to the Beatles' concerts in Tokyo the following year, the visit was the subject of national debate as traditionalists were opposed to the group's influence and the decision to allow them to perform at the Nippon Budokan, a venue reserved for martial arts and a shrine to Japan's war dead. The Beatles received death threats and ultranationalist students demonstrated outside the Budokan during their stay.

Shortly afterwards, the band played in Manila in the Philippines, at a time when the country was keen to project a pro-Western image with the recent inauguration of President Ferdinand Marcos. There, the Beatles' nonattendance at an official function organised by Imelda Marcos was perceived as an insult to the nation's first family; it led to recrimination in the local press, the band's security detail being withdrawn, and mob violence against them as they attempted to leave the country. Filipino writer Nick Joaquin said the situation was indicative of how the Philippines had been attracted to the Beatles' image without appreciating that their message was one advocating individuality, adventurousness and originality over the qualities that still defined the country: tradition and order. Joaquin likened the group's presence in Manila to Batman being transplanted to Thebes in Ancient Greece.

A "Beatle burning" in Waycross, Georgia, August 1966. The image is one of the most famous photographs of the anti-rock movement.

The band enjoyed what Epstein termed a "special relationship" with the US until late July 1966, when Datebook magazine published an interview that Lennon gave for the London Evening Standard's "How Does a Beatle Live?" series. In the interview, Lennon said the Beatles were "more popular than Jesus", such was the decline of Christianity. His comments caused no significant reaction in the UK, but radio stations in the US Bible Belt soon launched a boycott of Beatles music and organised bonfires of the band's records and merchandise. For some Southern commentators, the furore over Lennon's alleged blasphemy allowed them to air their suppressed grievances regarding the Beatles' long hair and the group's support for African-American musicians. Spain and South Africa joined in the radio ban, as did other stations in the US, and the Vatican issued a statement condemning Lennon's remark.

At Epstein's insistence, Lennon apologised during a press conference at the start of the band's US tour. Members of the Ku Klux Klan threatened reprisals against the Beatles, particularly when they were due to play in Memphis, but the tour passed without major incident. Further to their experiences in Tokyo and Manila, the "Jesus" controversy confirmed the Beatles' decision to retire as live performers in 1966. Another religious controversy ensued in the US in reaction to the band's 1969 single "The Ballad of John and Yoko", due to Lennon's use of the word "Christ" and reference to crucifixion. (Note: Before then, some religious groups in the US had attacked "She's Leaving Home" for its supposed pro-abortion sentiments.)

== Recording practices and electronic music ==
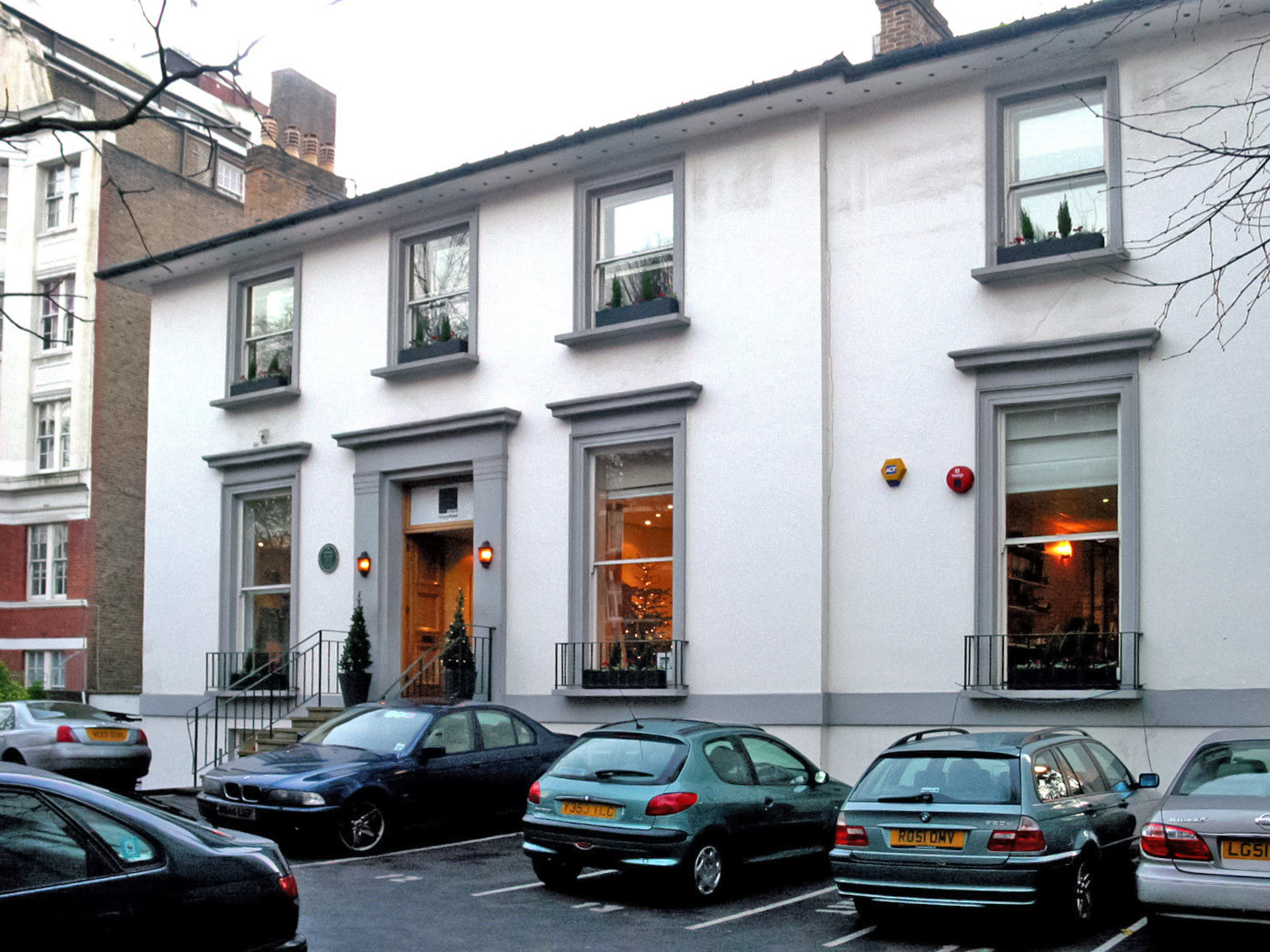
The Beatles recorded the majority of their music at EMI's Abbey Road Studios. The facility officially changed its name from EMI Studios in the early 1970s in acknowledgement of the Beatles' 1969 album Abbey Road.

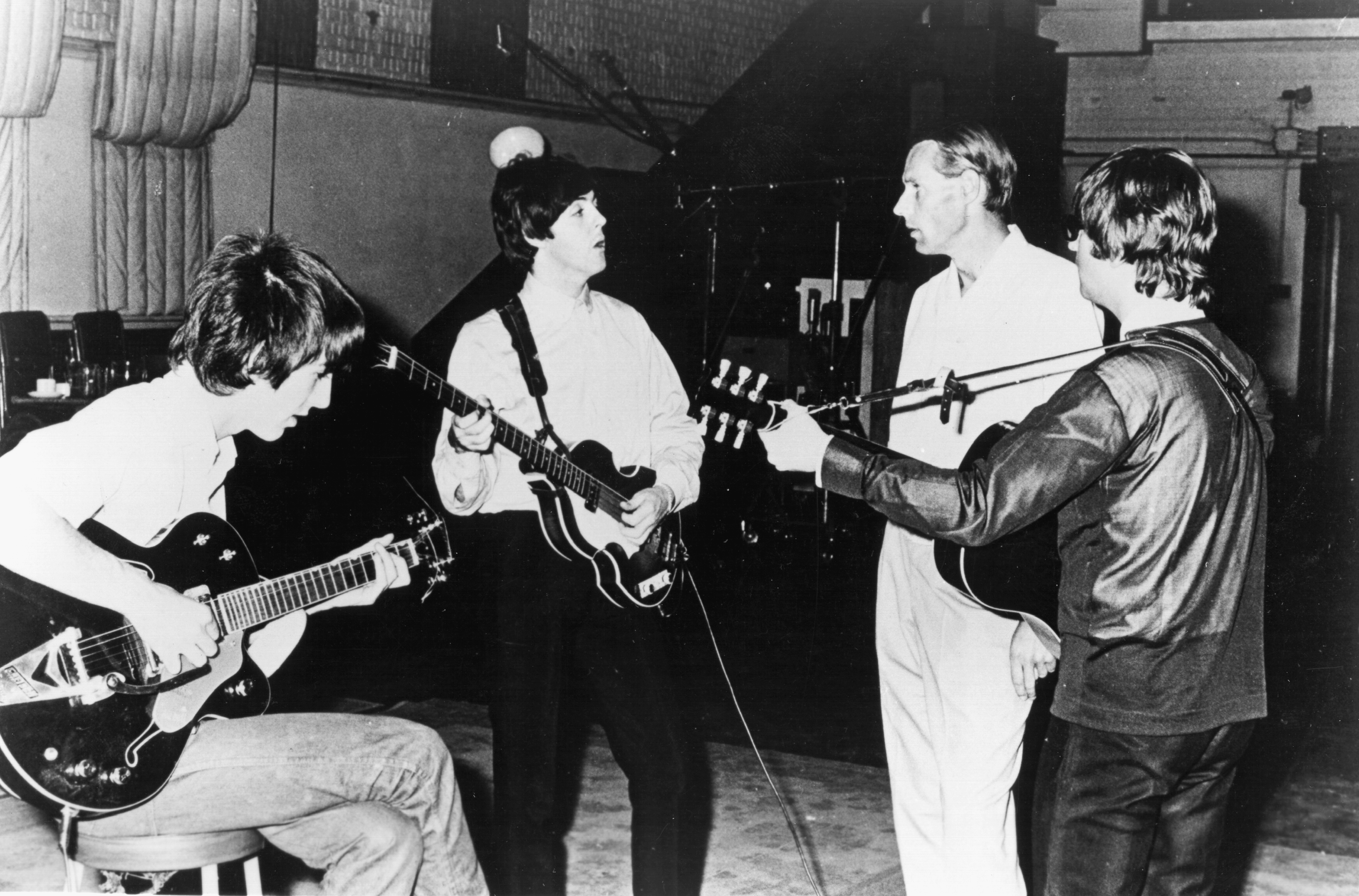
Harrison, McCartney and Lennon with George Martin at EMI Studios, c. 1965

In his role as the Beatles' record producer, George Martin is generally credited with helping to popularise the idea of the recording studio as an instrument used for in-studio composition. Although he was nominally the Beatles' producer, however, from 1964 he ceded control to the band, allowing them to use the studio as a workshop for their ideas and later as a sound laboratory. Musicologist Olivier Julien writes that the Beatles' "gradual integration of arranging and recording into one and the same process" began as early as 1963, but developed in earnest during the sessions for Rubber Soul and Revolver and "ultimately blossomed" during the sessions for Sgt. Pepper. In acquiring control over the recording process, whereby Martin and his engineers became facilitators of the musicians' ideas, the Beatles reversed the strict hierarchy that had long been in place at EMI. In addition to inspiring other artists, their example helped break the hold that EMI and Decca Records had on the British recording industry, leading to the growth of independent studios there, including the Beatles' own Apple Studio.

In Everett's description, Revolver was both an "innovative example" of electronic music and a work that "advanced the leading edge of the rock world". The album makes full use of an assortment of studio tricks such as varispeed and backwards (or backmasked) taping; according to authors Kevin Ryan and Brian Kehew, artificial double tracking (ADT), backwards recording, and close-miked drums were among the nine techniques that the Revolver sessions introduced into the recording world for the first time. The 1966 B-side "Rain", recorded during the Revolver sessions, was the first pop recording to include reversed sounds, while the album track "I'm Only Sleeping" included the first example of backwards lead guitar on a pop recording. (Note: Harrison wrote and arranged his parts for the song with a view to how the notes would sound when the tape direction was corrected after recording.)

"Tomorrow Never Knows" from Revolver (1966)
"Tomorrow Never Knows" featured multiple tape loops overdubbed live onto a rhythm track, reversed sounds and extreme tape manipulation, thereby introducing into pop music techniques that were commonly used in the electronic genre.

Citing composer and producer Virgil Moorefield's book The Producer as Composer, author Jay Hodgson highlights Revolver as representing a "dramatic turning point" in recording history through its dedication to studio exploration over the "performability" of the songs, as this and subsequent Beatles albums reshaped listeners' preconceptions of a pop recording. "Tomorrow Never Knows", according to author David Howard, was one of two pop recordings that ensured that the studio "was now its own instrument" (the other being Phil Spector's "River Deep – Mountain High"). ADT soon became a standard pop production technique, and led to related developments such as the artificial chorus effect. MacDonald credits the use of damping and close-miking on Starr's drums with creating a "three-dimensional" sound that, along with other Beatles innovations, engineers in the US would soon adopt as standard practice. (Note: American producer Tony Visconti has cited Revolver as a work that "showed how the studio could be used as an instrument" and partly inspired his relocation to London in the late 1960s, "to learn how people made records like this".)

Sgt. Pepper's Lonely Hearts Club Band, according to Julien, represents the "epitome of the transformation of the recording studio into a compositional tool", marking the moment when "popular music entered the era of phonographic composition." Quoting a composer from the UCLA School of Music, Time magazine's appreciation of Sgt. Pepper recognised the Beatles as having adopted concepts first pioneered by the Cologne group, thereby making an "enormous contribution to electronic music". Musician and producer Alan Parsons believed that with Sgt. Pepper, "people then started thinking that you could spend a year making an album and they began to consider an album as a sound composition and not just a musical composition. The idea was gradually forming of a record being a performance in its own right and not just a reproduction of a live performance."

Released on The Beatles, the eight-minute "Revolution 9" was an overt exercise in electronic music and the avant-garde. MacDonald identifies the track as another example of the Beatles introducing a previously elite scene to a mainstream audience and describes it as "the world's most widely distributed avant-garde artifact". In early 1969, Harrison became one of the first musicians in the UK to own a Moog synthesizer, which the Beatles went on to use on Abbey Road tracks such as "Here Comes the Sun" and "I Want You (She's So Heavy)". Writing in his book on electronic music, author Thom Holmes says that in this way the Beatles were "one of the first groups to effectively integrate the sounds of the Moog into their music".

=== As dedicated recording artists ===
In Gould's description, the Beatles' career trajectory was largely self-determined and free of the show business considerations that had limited and defined the model of stardom represented by Presley and Sinatra. The band's decision to retire from live performance in 1966 and become a group focused solely on studio recording had no precedent. Given the premium placed on concerts, the press assumed the Beatles were due to break up. From that year onwards, according to Everett, their albums "each suggested ... a different set of rules and that these rules were dictated by the artists". Barry Miles, a leading figure in the 1960s London underground, described Revolver as the "step-change" that signalled "the way forward for all rock musicians who wondered if there was life after teen scream status".

According to Doyle Greene, while academics disagree on whether the Beatles were modernists or postmodernists, Sgt. Pepper "arguably marked rock's music's entry into postmodernism as opposed to high-modernism". At McCartney's suggestion, the group adopted alter egos as members of the fictitious Sgt. Pepper's Lonely Hearts Club Band, an approach that inspired similar practices by glam rock acts of the 1970s. McCartney assumed an unofficial leadership role of the Beatles following Epstein's death in August 1967, but his bandmates soon challenged this position after the critical failure of Magical Mystery Tour. Stark cites the TV film as the first example of the Beatles being afflicted by "Michael Jordan syndrome", in that they excelled as songwriters and recording artists but mistakenly believed that their talents would transfer effectively to film and business projects.

The group recorded their 1968 double album in an often divisive atmosphere, which was partly a backlash against the level of McCartney's involvement in the band's activities. The postmodern traits of politics, parody and pastiche were the subject of adverse scrutiny on The Beatles. Everett says that for the majority of baby boomers, the White Album represents "the double album" of the era. (Note: More often than Sgt. Pepper, generations of musicians continuing into the 2000s celebrated the subversion of pop conventions and diverse showcase of genres as seen on the White Album.) Cultural critic Camille Paglia likened the Beatles' final recording projects – the Get Back filmed rehearsals, which subsequently produced Let It Be, and Abbey Road – to the last phase in a "tripartite pattern" that typified the early, high and late periods of painters such as Picasso and Donatello; within this final phase, just as "major artists revolt, resimplify", the band sought to abandon the studio sophistication of Sgt. Pepper. Abbey Road reflected a compromise in the diverging artistic visions of Lennon and McCartney but became the Beatles' best-selling album. In Stark's description, some critics came to view the LP as the band's "farewell to their fans and an attack on 'selfishness and self-gratification'", particularly through McCartney's closing statement in the side two "Long Medley".

== Psychedelic, progressive, and hard-rock styles ==
=== Western classical fusion ===
Music critics Robert Christgau and Mark Ellen each identify Rubber Soul as the album that laid the foundations for psychedelia. Citing a quantitative study of tempos in music from the era, Everett identifies it as a work that was "made more to be thought about than danced to", and an album that "began a far-reaching trend" in its slowing-down of the tempos typically used in pop and rock music. Many baroque-rock works appeared soon afterwards, particularly due to Martin's harpsichord-like solo on the track "In My Life", while the album also marked the introduction into pop of the pump organ or harmonium. (Note: On "In My Life", the solo instrument was actually a piano taped at half speed.) Revolver ensured that psychedelic pop emerged from its underground roots and into the mainstream, while "Rain" originated British psychedelic rock. The chamber-orchestrated "Eleanor Rigby" is cited by Simonelli as an example of the Beatles' influence being such that, whatever the style of song, it helped to define the parameters of rock music.

The 1967 double A-side single "Strawberry Fields Forever" / "Penny Lane" comprised two songs in which Lennon and McCartney, respectively, celebrated their Liverpool upbringing. Simonelli writes that the songs instilled the Romantic artistic tradition as a central tenet of psychedelic rock. In MacDonald's view, "Strawberry Fields Forever" launched both the "English pop-pastoral mood" typified by bands such as Pink Floyd, Family, Traffic and Fairport Convention, and English psychedelia's LSD-inspired preoccupation with "nostalgia for the innocent vision of a child". The Mellotron's appearance on the track remains the most celebrated use of the instrument on a pop or rock recording. Together with the resonant tone of Starr's drums, the cello arrangement on "Strawberry Fields Forever" (as with "I Am the Walrus" from Magical Mystery Tour) was much admired by other musicians and producers, and proved highly influential on 1970s bands such as Electric Light Orchestra and Wizzard.

AllMusic states that the first wave of art rock musicians were inspired by Sgt. Pepper and believed that for rock music to grow artistically, they should incorporate elements of European and classical music to the genre. Sgt. Pepper is also frequently cited as the first true concept album, a medium that became central to progressive rock. According to Moore, "Even though previous albums had set a unified mood (notably Sinatra's Songs for Swingin' Lovers!), it was on the basis of the influence of Sgt. Pepper that the penchant for the concept album was born." According to Everett, the Beatles' "experimental timbres, rhythms, tonal structures, and poetic texts" on Rubber Soul and Revolver "encouraged a legion of young bands that were to create progressive rock in the early 1970s". Sgt. Pepper's Lonely Hearts Club Band (along with Pet Sounds) is largely viewed as originating the progressive rock genre due to the album's lyrical unity, extended structure, complexity, eclecticism, experimentalism and influences derived from classical music forms. For several years following its release, straightforward rock and roll was supplanted by a growing interest in extended form, and numerous English psychedelic bands developed characteristics of the Beatles' music (specifically their classical influence) further than either the Beatles or contemporaneous West Coast psychedelic bands.

=== Raga rock and Eastern fusion ===
"Within You Without You" from Sgt. Pepper's Lonely Hearts Club Band (1967)
The combination of Eastern and rock idioms in "Within You Without You" showcased the Beatles as forerunners in progressive rock with their concern for eclecticism, one of the genre's key attributes.

Indian culture, in the form of music and mysticism, was a significant component of the Beatles' image. Following on from the Kinks, the Yardbirds and the Beatles themselves (with "Ticket to Ride") incorporating droning guitars to mimic the qualities of the Indian sitar, Rubber Soul's "Norwegian Wood" featured the first use of the instrument by a Western pop musician. Played by Harrison, the sitar part launched a craze that Indian classical musician Ravi Shankar termed "the great sitar explosion", as the instrument became a popular feature in raga rock and psychedelic music. The song is often identified as the first example of raga rock, a subgenre that was officially launched by the Byrds with their March 1966 single "Eight Miles High".

Revolver featured two overtly Indian-styled songs: "Tomorrow Never Knows", with its foundation of heavy tambura drone, and "Love You To". According to the Garland Encyclopedia of World Music, Revolver was the first major American-derived popular music to incorporate Asian techniques and instrumentation. In his book Popular World Music, Andrew Shahriari writes that the Beatles are not usually recognised as world music artists, yet their use of Indian musical instruments, which was led by Harrison's interest, was "revolutionary" in the context of 1960s European and American popular music. While Harrison was not the only rock musician to experiment with Indian styles in the mid-1960s, the Beatles' association with the genre ensured that Indian classical music reached its widest audience, through songs such as "Within You Without You". (Note: Lavezzoli groups Harrison with Paul Simon and Peter Gabriel as the three rock musicians who have given the most "mainstream exposure to non-Western musics, or the concept of 'world music'".) In his 1997 book Indian Music and the West, ethnomusicologist Gerry Farrell said that "nearly thirty years on, the Beatles' 'Indian' songs remain among the most imaginative and successful examples of this type of fusion – for example, 'Blue Jay Way' and 'The Inner Light.'"

=== Heavy metal, stoner rock, and progressive soul ===
The Beatles directly influenced the development of heavy metal in the late 1960s. "Helter Skelter" was a product of McCartney's attempt to create a sound as loud and dirty as possible, and the recording has been noted for its "proto-metal roar" by AllMusic's Stephen Thomas Erlewine. Recorded in the hard rock style with heavily distorted guitars, "Revolution" was the subject of complaints at retail level in 1968, since many listeners assumed the sound was the result of a manufacturing error.

Discussing Lennon's "I Want You (She's So Heavy)", Guitar World's Josh Hart and Damien Fanelli called the song a "bluesy rocker" that "might have inadvertently started doom metal". Jo Kendall of Classic Rock magazine similarly commented that the song predated "Black Sabbath's creation of doom rock by several months" and noted the "Santana-like Latin blues section" in the song. James Manning, of Time Out London, describes the song as the foundation for stoner rock.

Progressive soul artists at the turn of the 1970s, such as Stevie Wonder, George Clinton, and War, drew on the Beatles' album-oriented approach and experimentation with non-traditional music influences. As bandleader for Parliament and Funkadelic, Clinton specifically pointed to how the Beatles "made an art out of nonsense" on songs such as "I Am the Walrus", alongside other influences from Bob Dylan's music and "Black Power" literature.

== Record formats ==
Both sides of the Beatles' singles were often major US hits, an achievement that helped elevate the perception of a B-side from its role as a disposable song. The group's December 1965 single pairing "Day Tripper" and "We Can Work It Out" was the first example of a double A-side single in Britain. Its success popularised the format and, in giving equal treatment to two songs, allowed recording artists to show their versatility. The band issued further double A-sides – "Eleanor Rigby" / "Yellow Submarine", "Strawberry Fields Forever" / "Penny Lane" and "Something" / "Come Together" – when they thought that both songs in the pairing were equally strong. Their Magical Mystery Tour double EP, containing the six new songs from the TV film, was also the first example of that format being used in the UK.

In January 1966, Billboard magazine cited the initial US sales of Rubber Soul (1.2 million copies over nine days) as evidence of teenage record-buyers increasingly moving towards the LP format. According to Gould, Sgt. Pepper's impact was such that it "revolutionize[d] both the aesthetics and the economics of the record business in ways that far outstripped the earlier pop explosions triggered by the Elvis phenomenon of 1956 and the Beatlemania phenomenon of 1963". Although The Beatles was not the first rock double album, it was the longest up to that time, at close to 94 minutes.

== Album artwork ==
The Beatles' album covers furthered the medium as an art form and were widely imitated. Doggett recognises the cover photos for With the Beatles and Rubber Soul as examples of the band's image being used to "test the limits of the portrait", a movement that was also reflected in the cover designs for contemporary albums by Dylan and the Rolling Stones. Robert Freeman's monochrome cover shot for With the Beatles (or Capitol's Meet the Beatles! in the US) departed from convention, and alarmed EMI, by showing the band members looking austere and unsmiling. This stance was heightened in Freeman's cover portrait for Beatles for Sale, which departed further from the standard pop LP by reducing the album title to minuscule type and otherwise making no mention of the band's name. According to Schaffner, each Beatles LP cover represented a "revolution in artwork" starting with Rubber Soul. The latter featured a distorted image of the band's faces, which were nevertheless so instantly recognisable by 1965 that no artist credit was necessary.

For the US LP Yesterday and Today in 1966, the Beatles supplied Capitol with a cover showing them in butcher's white coats and clutching raw meat and dismembered dolls. Known as the "butcher cover", it was intended as a comment on the Vietnam War, although the photo was also interpreted as a criticism of Capitol's policy of altering the content of Beatles albums for the North American market. American disc jockeys and retailers were appalled by the image; KRLA Beat magazine described it as "the most nauseating album cover ever seen in the US". Capitol soon recalled all copies of the album and replaced the cover with a less provocative band portrait. The episode predated cover controversies such as those for LPs by the Rolling Stones (with Beggars Banquet) and Blind Faith in the late 1960s and by Alice Cooper, Mom's Apple Pie, Roxy Music and Golden Earring in the 1970s.

The cover for Revolver was one of several Beatles LP covers that furthered the medium as an art form. Designed by German musician and artist Klaus Voormann, it won the 1967 Grammy Award for Best Album Cover, Graphic Arts.

Writing in their book The Art of the LP, Johnny Morgan and Ben Wardle say the Beatles were arguably the leaders in "creating identity" through album artwork, an approach they consider motivated by the group's retirement as live performers, as well as the catalyst for record company art designers to incorporate drug allusions in their LP covers following the example set by Revolver and Sgt. Pepper. The design for Revolver was markedly different from LP covers of 1966, particularly in its eschewing of vibrant psychedelic colours for black-and-white; in Gould's view, it supported the aesthetic of the music and the Beatles' determination to reinvent themselves on record. Created by Klaus Voormann, the band's friend from their years in Hamburg, the cover combined line-drawing caricatures of the Beatles' faces with a collage of older photos. In the line drawings, Voormann drew inspiration from the work of the nineteenth-century illustrator Aubrey Beardsley, who was the subject of a long-running exhibition at London's Victoria and Albert Museum and highly influential on fashion and design themes of the time. Voormann placed the various photos within the tangle of hair connecting the four faces, thereby, in Rodriguez's description, capturing both the long hair synonymous with the band's public image and "the explosion of ideas that were pouring out of their heads".

According to author Ian Inglis, the cover for Sgt. Pepper is widely recognised for demonstrating an "unprecedented correspondence between music and art, time and space", and it initiated an acceptance of album artwork as an "integral component" of the listening experience. The LP's gatefold packaging included cardboard cutouts and, for the first time in a pop album, printed lyrics. The inclusion of the lyrics infuriated sheet music publishers, who lost the revenue from sales of the songs' sheet music. In the late 1990s, the BBC included the Sgt. Pepper cover in its list of British masterpieces of twentieth-century art and design, placing it ahead of the red telephone box, Mary Quant's miniskirt, and the Mini motorcar. The cover of The Beatles contrasted with that of Sgt. Pepper by featuring a minimalist concept of plain white, with the title rendered in plain type. Each copy was individually numbered on the cover, thereby lending a uniqueness to each one and reflecting a tenet of conceptual art.

== Film and music videos ==
A Hard Day's Night broke new ground in the field of British and American musical feature films, particularly in its abandoning of the genre's standard rags-to-riches premise for a comedic presentation of the artists playing themselves. Film historian Stephen Glynn describes it as "the canonical pop music film". He highlights the innovative techniques Lester uses in the sequence for "Can't Buy Me Love", as does Saul Austerlitz, who deems it the precursor to the modern music video. Lester's use of devices from the European art-house tradition, combined with the film's comedic and satirical qualities, ensured that A Hard Day's Night defied easy categorisation and won critical recognition for the rock music film. Andrew Sarris of The Village Voice called it "the Citizen Kane of jukebox musicals".

With Help!, Lester presented the Beatles in "one of the central surrealist texts" of the 1960s, according to Bray. The film uses pop art visuals and satirises James Bond films, particularly the latter's depiction of the British Secret Service as an efficiently run organisation, and one enjoying a level of influence equal to its US counterpart in their shared operations. (Note: Less critically lauded than its predecessor, Help! is described by Glynn as "the colonial pop music film" for its conveying of the "clear racial undertones" and imperialism evident in Bond films from the period, and the clash that results with the Beatles' Swinging London personas.) In addition to inspiring The Monkees, the film influenced the Batman TV series.

Starting with "Day Tripper" and "We Can Work It Out" in late 1965, the band filmed promotional clips for their singles to circumvent the industry norm of having to make numerous personal appearances on television shows. The Beatles' promotional clips anticipated the music video and the rise of MTV in the 1980s. The clips for "Strawberry Fields Forever" and "Penny Lane" are considered pioneering works in the medium. Both avoided performance of the song in response to the 1966 Musicians' Union's ban on miming on TV; in the case of "Strawberry Fields Forever", the clip employs abstract imagery and features reverse film effects, stop motion animation, jump-cuts from day- to night-time, superimposition and close-up shots. Referring to the 1968 clip for "Hey Jude" and the sight of the Beatles engulfed by a crowd made up of "young, old, male, female, black, brown, and white" fans, Hertsgaard describes it as "a quintessential sixties moment, a touching tableau of contentment and togetherness".

Yellow Submarine, the Beatles' third film for United Artists, provided a revolution in animated film and allowed animators to fully express ideas using psychedelic visuals. It marked a departure from the confines of Disney's productions and was credited with saving the feature-length animated film. Austerlitz describes the Beatles' rooftop performance of "Get Back" as "legendary". Filmed in January 1969 for the finale to the United Artists documentary film Let It Be, the clip was homaged by U2 in the video for their 1987 single "Where the Streets Have No Name" and by Red Hot Chili Peppers in the video for their 2011 single "The Adventures of Rain Dance Maggie".

== Idealism and the counterculture ==
Rubber Soul included Lennon's "The Word", the lyrics of which anticipated the ethos behind the counterculture's 1967 Summer of Love, while Revolver included a number of songs whose lyrics address themes of death, isolation and transcendence from material concerns. Of "Tomorrow Never Knows", Lennon's evocation of an LSD trip, MacDonald writes that the song's message "launched the till-then élite-preserved concept of mind-expansion into pop, simultaneously drawing attention to consciousness-enhancing drugs and the ancient religious philosophies of the Orient, utterly alien to Western thought in their anti-materialism, rapt passivity, and world-sceptical focus on visionary consciousness". In author Shawn Levy's description, Revolver presented the Beatles as "the world's first household psychedelics, avatars of something wilder and more revolutionary than anything pop culture had ever delivered before".

From 1966, the Beatles began to promulgate a world view espousing LSD-inspired higher consciousness, led by Lennon and Harrison defying Epstein's insistence that the group refrain from commenting on political issues such as the Vietnam War. The controversy surrounding Lennon's "more popular than Jesus" remark reinforced their determination to speak out and furthered their standing in the emerging counterculture. Cultural commentator Mark Hertsgaard writes that the band did not directly address racism, war or social justice in their songs from this period, yet a "sensibility ... permeated their music" and "The essence of the Beatles' message was not simply that the world had to change, but, more importantly, that it could change." He sees this best exemplified in Sgt. Pepper's Lonely Hearts Club Band and says that Harrison's song "Within You Without You" "contained the album's most overt expression of the Beatles' shared belief in spiritual awareness and social change". Abbie Hoffman likened Sgt. Pepper to "Beethoven coming to the supermarket", adding: "It summed up so much of what we were saying politically, culturally, artistically, expressing our inner feelings and our view of the world in a way that was so revolutionary."

Colourised frame from the Our World broadcast of "All You Need Is Love", June 1967. Author Peter Doggett described the performance as "one of the strongest visual impressions" from the Summer of Love.

On 25 June 1967, the Beatles premiered "All You Need Is Love" live on the BBC's Our World satellite broadcast before an international audience estimated at 400 million. In his feature on the song in Rolling Stone, Gavin Edwards writes that when "All You Need Is Love" was issued as a single weeks later, it reached "Number One all over the world, providing the sing-song anthem for the Summer of Love, with a sentiment that was simple but profound". Simonelli credits the song with formally announcing the arrival of flower power ideology as a mainstream concept. Psychiatrist R. D. Laing, who incorporated the Beatles' and Dylan's music and LSD in his treatment at his Kingsley Hall practice, recalled of the song's relevance: "Everyone was getting the feel of the world as a global village – as us, one species ... One of the most heartening things about the Beatles was that they gave expression to a shared sense of celebration around the world, a sense of the same sensibility."

In response to the political events and more turbulent atmosphere of 1968, the Beatles released "Revolution", in the lyrics to which Lennon espoused a pacifist agenda over violent confrontation. The song inspired the first in-depth debate regarding the connection between rock music and politics, where beforehand music journalists and political radicals in the US had mostly viewed their respective fields in isolation. Lennon's stance drew heavy criticism from New Left writers as the single's release coincided with the violent subjugation of Vietnam War protestors at the Democratic National Convention in Chicago, and condemnation in the West of the Soviet-led invasion of Czechoslovakia and its crushing of attempts to introduce democratic reforms there. With its more universal message, McCartney's "Hey Jude", the A-side of the single, was adopted as an anthem by Czech citizens in their struggle. The Beatles was similarly attacked by the radical left. While the counterculture adopted "Piggies" as an anti-establishment anthem, many radicals viewed the band's use of parody and satire throughout the album as evidence of their disengagement with pressing political issues. (Note: "Back in the U.S.S.R.", the opening track, was criticised by the New Left for its apparent trivialising of the Soviet Union's actions in Czechoslovakia. The song's sympathetic portrayal of Russians was more widely condemned by far-right commentators in the US, particularly Noebel and the John Birch Society.)

The Beatles' influence on the more radicalised sectors of the counterculture and the New Left declined as the band refused to engage in direct activism against the establishment. Lennon furthered his stance by campaigning for world peace with Ono in 1969 and, in Simonelli's description, remained the "most popular political voice in rock music" until 1972. (Note: Lennon and Ono's campaign was given credibility when they were granted an audience with Canadian prime minister Pierre Trudeau in late 1969. Soon afterwards, Lennon was the subject of a documentary on BBC television's 24 Hours and was one of the three individuals (along with Kennedy and Chairman Mao) featured in the ATV series Men of the Decade.) The Beatles retained their social influence through to the band's break-up, and their idealism continued to resonate in the politics of the Vietnam War era. Released in September 1969, Abbey Road included "Come Together", which Lennon began writing as a campaign song for Timothy Leary's bid to become governor of California. Harrison's "Here Comes the Sun" was adopted by George McGovern in his campaign for the US presidency, the initial success of which, according to Schaffner, was a "triumph for the counterculture's attempt to wield power via conventional electoral politics". (Note: In the mid 1970s, "Here Comes the Sun" was chosen, along with recordings by Beethoven and Chuck Berry, for inclusion on astronomer Carl Sagan's Voyager Gold Record, which would accompany the Voyager space probe and provide aliens with a document of human life. Copyright issues prevented Sagan's team from including the song, however.)

== Drug culture ==
According to music critic Jim DeRogatis, the Beatles are seen as the "Acid Apostles of the New Age". The band's connection with recreational drugs was important to their position as leaders of the counterculture, as was their embrace of Indian religion. According to Kureishi, drugs had long been connected to music, but "the Beatles were the first to parade their particular drug use – marijuana and LSD – without shame ... The Beatles made taking drugs seem an enjoyable, fashionable and liberating experience, like them, you would see and feel in ways you hadn't imagined possible."

The band's drug-taking became public knowledge with the release of Sgt. Pepper. (Note: Before then, Rubber Soul had resonated with students in San Francisco, who guessed that the album was inspired by drugs. According to Levy, no knowledgeable listener could have missed the allusions on Revolver – particularly in Lennon's "Tomorrow Never Knows", "I'm Only Sleeping" and "She Said She Said" – which he describes as "the first true drug album, not [just] a pop record with some druggy insinuations".) "A Day in the Life", the album's closing track, was banned by the BBC for an alleged drug reference in the line "I'd love to turn you on"; with "Lucy in the Sky with Diamonds", the title was widely read as a code for LSD. Although he had long resisted Lennon and Harrison's urging before trying the drug, McCartney announced in a Life article in June 1967 that he had taken LSD. When asked to confirm his statement by an ITN reporter, McCartney repeated that he had taken the drug. In the UK, according to MacDonald, the admission "brought howls of righteous anger on their heads" in a manner similar to the 1966 Jesus controversy. As a show of support, Lennon, Harrison and Epstein announced that they too had taken LSD. In July 1967, all four Beatles added their signatures to a petition demanding the legalisation of marijuana and paid for its publication in a full-page ad in The Times.

McCartney's admission formalised the link between rock music and drugs, and, as in the 1966 controversy, attracted scorn from American religious leaders and conservatives. In early August 1967, Harrison made a well-publicised visit to the Haight-Ashbury district of San Francisco, the epicentre of the counterculture during the Summer of Love, which was viewed as a further endorsement of the drug culture. (Note: Harrison was dismayed that Haight-Ashbury appeared to be full of dropouts, however, rather than people looking to create an alternative society. After returning to England he privately decided to stop taking LSD.) Leary, an LSD advocate whose text The Psychedelic Experience: A Manual Based on the Tibetan Book of the Dead Lennon had used in his lyrics for "Tomorrow Never Knows", declared the Beatles to be "the wisest, holiest, most effective avatars (Divine Incarnate, God Agents) that the human race has ever produced". A United Nations report stated that the Beatles, along with the Rolling Stones and other rock bands, promoted drug use through their music, and that young listeners were following their lead. Bray writes that, rather than advocating drug-taking as a road to "mindless oblivion", the Beatles' espousal of LSD was focused on enlightenment and was therefore one of their "key legacies to the counterculture".

In early 1967, the Beatles' elevated status as MBEs ensured that Harrison and his wife, English model Pattie Boyd, were allowed to leave a party in Sussex before Mick Jagger and Keith Richards of the Rolling Stones were arrested on drugs charges. As a result of McCartney's LSD admission, however, the British authorities' indulgence of the band started to wane significantly. According to Harris, the turning point was Magical Mystery Tour, which was broadcast on Boxing Day 1967 and earned the group their first scathing reviews. (Note: At this time, Yellow Submarine was pulled from its UK cinema run due to what the Rank Organisation claimed were poor attendance figures. According to author Stephen Glynn, the published box-office receipts refute this explanation, and Rank most likely withdrew the film because of its drug-inspired content and sequences evoking the hallucinogenic state.) In October 1968, Lennon and Ono were arrested on charges of cannabis possession; Lennon maintained he had been warned of the raid and that the drugs were planted by the arresting officers from the London Drug Squad. (Note: MacDonald cites Lennon's failure to continue playing "a sort of eccentric national jester" – namely, by appearing naked with Ono on the cover of their 1968 avant-garde album Two Virgins – as the reason he was the only one in the band arrested at the time.) The same senior officer, Norman Pilcher, arrested Harrison and Boyd for possession in March 1969. Harrison also said that the evidence, which was found on a carpet, was planted, since: "I keep my socks in the sock drawer and my stash in the stash box. Anything else they must have brought."

With the release of "Cold Turkey", which the other Beatles had rejected as a possible single, Lennon made heroin addiction the subject of a pop hit for the first time. As part of an escalating national debate that had triggered an investigation by the US Congress, Vice-president Spiro Agnew launched a campaign in 1970 to address the issue of American youth being "brainwashed" into taking drugs through the music of the Beatles and other rock artists. (Note: Agnew contended that the "friends" referred to in the Sgt. Pepper track "With a Little Help from My Friends" were "assorted drugs". "Yellow Submarine" was another Beatles song that was scrutinised due to the pressure he applied on US radio programmers.)

== Spirituality and Transcendental Meditation ==
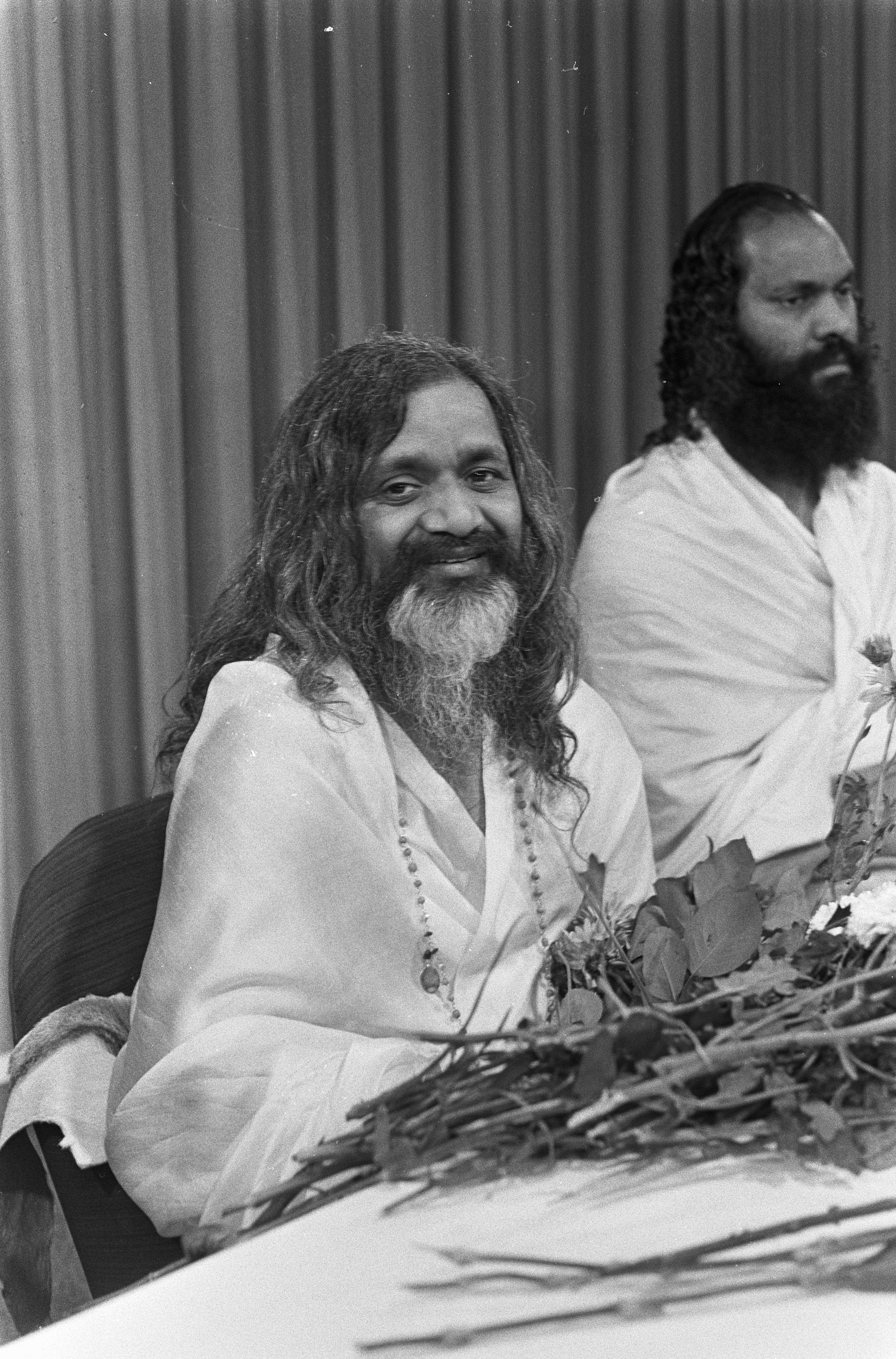
Maharishi Mahesh Yogi (left), pictured in Amsterdam in September 1967

The Beatles' interest in Eastern religions is described by MacDonald as arguably the "most striking example" of the band's ability to transform a minor social trend into a world-wide phenomenon and thereby "magnify" cultural developments during the second half of the 1960s. From 1967 to 1968, the group were promoters of Transcendental Meditation and the teachings of Maharishi Mahesh Yogi, which resulted in Transcendental Meditation becoming a worldwide phenomenon. As a result of the coverage given to the Beatles' interest, words such as "mantra" and "guru" became commonly used in the West for the first time. While the band's new, anti-LSD message was met with approval, their championing of the Maharishi and his TM technique was often the subject of confusion and ridicule in the mainstream press, particularly in Britain. (Note: At a court event in October, Queen Elizabeth II remarked to Sir Joseph Lockwood, the chairman of EMI: "The Beatles are turning awfully funny, aren't they?")

Before departing for the Maharishi's ashram in Rishikesh in February 1968, the Beatles recorded two songs that reflected their interest in TM: Lennon's "Across the Universe" and Harrison's "The Inner Light". Philip Goldberg, in his book American Veda, writes that the band's stay in Rishikesh "may have been the most momentous spiritual retreat since Jesus spent those forty days in the wilderness". Despite their later rejection of the Maharishi, the Beatles generated wider interest in Transcendental Meditation, which encouraged the study of Eastern spirituality in Western popular culture.

MacDonald credits Harrison with inspiring "the West's mainstream acquaintance with Hindu religion and creat[ing] the late-'60s so-called Spiritual Revival", and he deems this "a fundamental cultural sea-change ... [and] an abiding testimony to Harrison's importance as a counter-cultural figure". Spiritual biographer Gary Tillery also recognises the Beatles, or more specifically Harrison, as having "abruptly brought Indian spirituality to everyday awareness" through their association with the Maharishi. Tillery writes that, while the influence of Indian gurus such as Vivekananda, Yogananda, the Maharishi and Prabhupada was well established by the late 1960s, it was the Beatles' endorsement of their respective philosophies that most contributed to yoga and meditation centres becoming ubiquitous in Western cities and towns over subsequent decades. According to author Andrew Grant Jackson:

The Beats had promoted Buddhism since the 1950s, but it was George Harrison's songs espousing Hindu philosophy and featuring Indian musicians, and the Beatles' study of Transcendental Meditation, that truly kick-started the human potential movement of the 1970s (rebranded New Age in the 1980s). In this way, the musicians helped expand the freedom of religion the United States was founded on to encompass options outside the Judeo-Christian tradition.

== Apple Corps ==
The Beatles founded Apple Corps in January 1968. The company was intended as an alternative system of cultural production and consumption, run on countercultural principles whereby artists would not have to conform to established industry practice. McCartney likened its ethos to "Western communism". Schaffner described Apple Corps as "a Pepperland of their own" and "the first multi-million dollar, multi-media conglomerate to be operated both by and for the turned-on generation without any interference from the 'men in suits'".

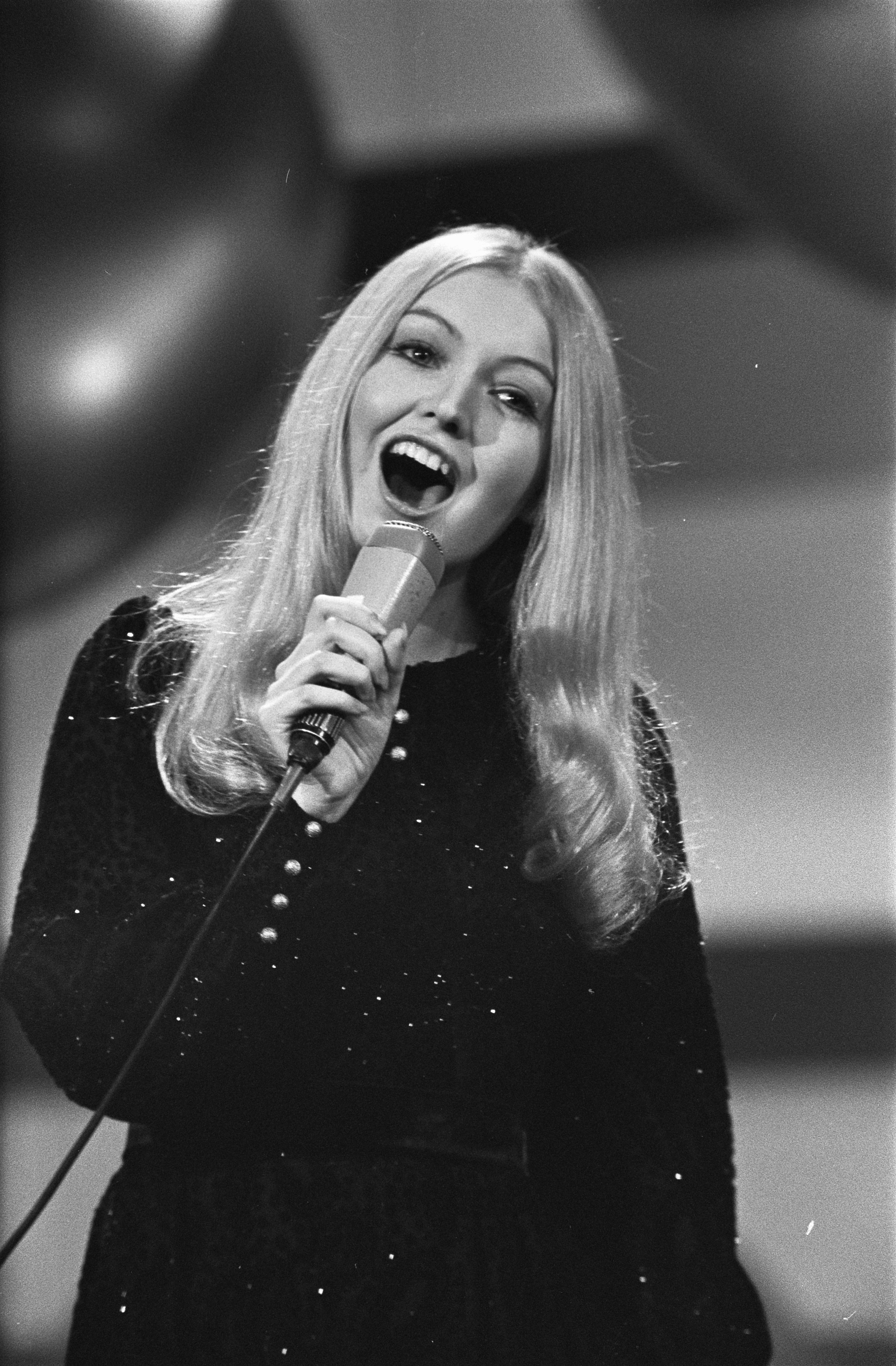
Welsh singer Mary Hopkin was among the artists who enjoyed success on Apple Records.

One of several divisions within the conglomerate was Apple Records, which Burns calls "the first record label of any consequence started by a band". The EMI-distributed label allowed the band members to further their individual interests and support artists of their choice, and it was a rare example of an artist-run label that progressed beyond a vanity project. Philo writes that, with the international success of the singles "Hey Jude" and Mary Hopkin's "Those Were the Days", "Apple's launch was comfortably the most successful label launch of all time." By 1970, with Harrison and McCartney as its principal producers, it had launched the international careers of acts such as Billy Preston, James Taylor and Badfinger.

Along with its subsidiary Zapple Records, Apple provided an outlet for Lennon to present himself as a fully fledged avant-garde artist in his collaborations with Ono, a direction that was at odds with the Beatles' work. In doing so, according to Schaffner, Lennon attracted ridicule and admiration alike as his work resembled "a one-way mirror that offered the world a clearer, more intimate picture of a celebrity than it had ever before known on such a scale". Harrison also issued solo albums on the label in the late 1960s, starting with the Wonderwall Music soundtrack. Author Peter Lavezzoli's describes the top 20 UK chart placing of the Radha Krishna Temple's "Hare Krishna Mantra" single, which Harrison produced in 1969, as an "astonishing achievement" that was indicative of the Beatles' ability to influence by association. Until the label's closure in the mid-1970s, Apple had the highest success rate of any British record company with regard to UK chart hits.

While Apple Corps soon floundered, it provided the inspiration for corporate philosophies adopted by companies such as Ben & Jerry's, Apple Computer, Inc. and Google. Beatles historian Bruce Spizer identifies the Apple iPod as the realisation of Lennon's idea of combining music, film and electronics.

== Manson, "Paul is dead", and break-up ==
From Revolver onwards, analysing the Beatles' lyrics for hidden meaning became a popular trend in the US. The lyrics on the band's 1968 double album progressed from being vague to open-ended and prone to misinterpretation, such as "Glass Onion" (the line "the walrus was Paul") and "Piggies" ("what they need's a damn good whacking"). In August 1969, Hollywood actress Sharon Tate and six other individuals were murdered by members of the Manson Family, acting on Charles Manson's interpretation of White Album songs such as "Helter Skelter", "Piggies" and "Revolution 9". Within weeks, unrelated rumours of McCartney's death began to spread, based on perceived clues left in the Beatles' lyrics and record sleeves. It was alleged that he had been replaced by a look-alike.

MacDonald cites Manson's Helter Skelter scenario as an example of the many "crackpot fixations" that the Beatles inspired in their drug-influenced audience, and a dangerous escalation of the otherwise harmless obsession that encouraged rumours such as the "Paul is dead" conspiracy theory. Schaffner described the latter as "the most monumental hoax since Orson Welles' War of the Worlds broadcast persuaded thousands of panicky New Jerseyites that Martian invaders were in the vicinity". Its escalation in 1969, particularly in the US, was informed by the counterculture's disillusionment with society and, according to American broadcaster Vin Scelsa, indicative of how songs by the Beatles, Dylan and the Rolling Stones were received as "personal message[s], worthy of endless scrutiny" and "guidelines on how to live your life".

Both the Manson murders and the Beatles' break-up are often cited as marking the decade's closure. According to Burns, the break-up in April 1970 was "like the Kennedy assassination all over again, or one's parents divorcing". The event was afforded the attention of a presidential assassination or the 1969 Moon landing, as commentators analysed the causes and speculated about the possibilities of a reunion. Burns writes that, throughout the 1970s, there persisted a sense that if the Beatles re-formed, it might revive "the 'era' that had seemed to have passed. When Lennon died, that truly was the end of ... the innocent, comforting, naive belief that the world at large could, somehow, be 'together' in the 1960s sense of the term."

Only a few acts continued the tradition of Beatles-style pop during the first half of the 1970s, but late in the decade, there was a renewed interest in the music and culture of the 1960s, with examples such as the Beatlemania musical and the growing mod revival. From the mid-1970s onwards, power pop bands drew inspiration from the jangle guitars, vocal harmonies and sense of "teenage innocence" that had been characteristics of the Merseybeat sound first popularised by the Beatles. In a 1991 Los Angeles Times article covering newer power pop bands, Chris Willman wrote that many of the groups were "very" influenced by the Beatles, although "not always directly", as some of the musicians said that they were instead predominately influenced by 1970s and 1980s artists who emulated the Beatles.

== Continued interest and influence ==
=== Literature, academia and science ===
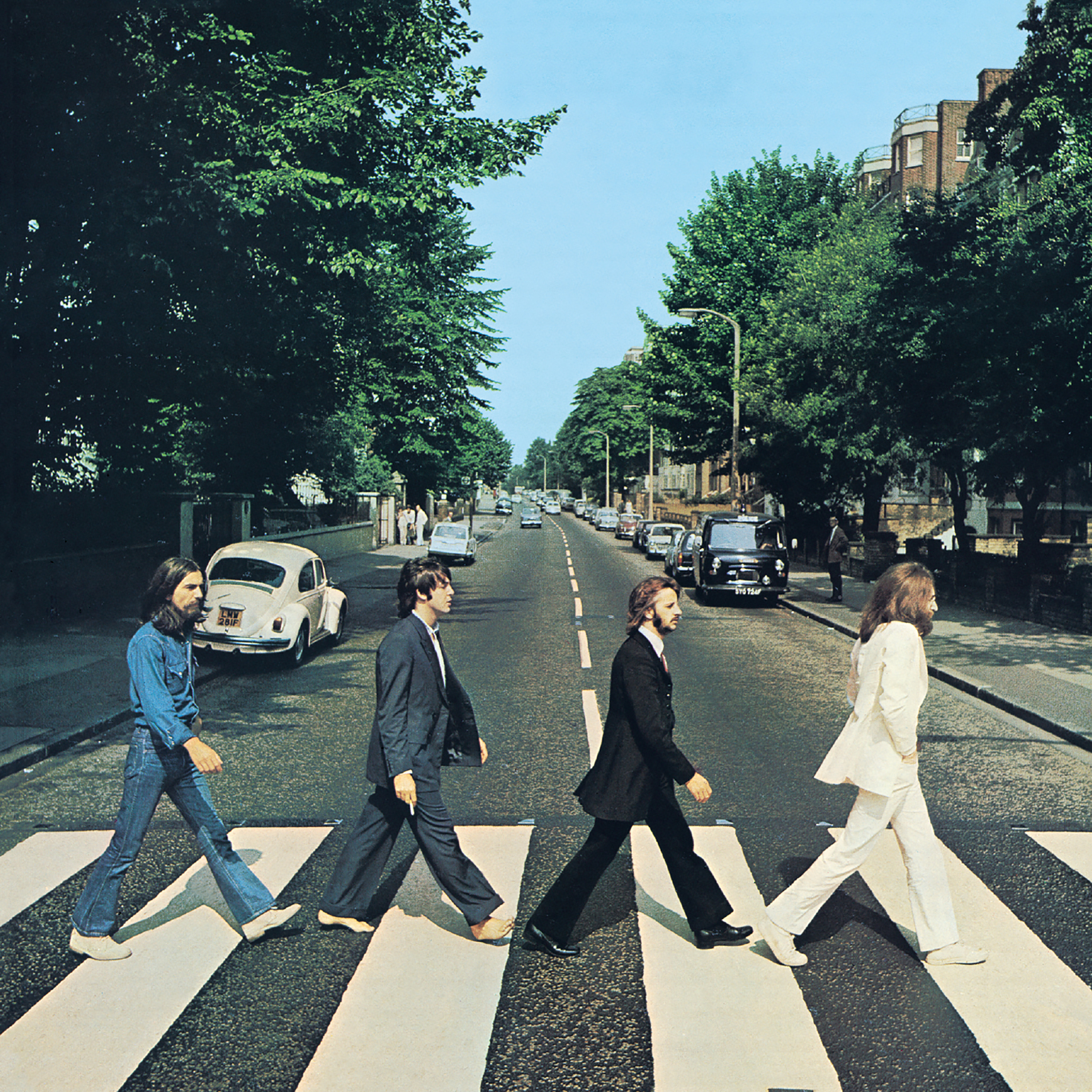
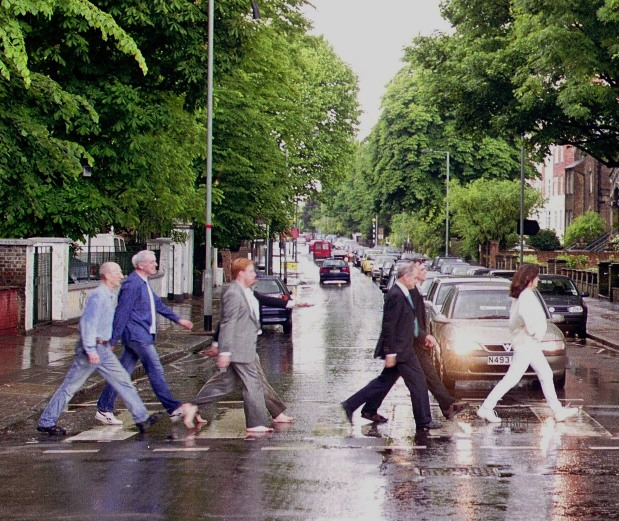
Cassini probe team recreating the cover of Abbey Road, one of the most famous and imitated album covers in history

In his biographical article on the Beatles for AllMusic, Richie Unterberger states, "Their supremacy as rock icons remains unchallenged to this day, decades after their breakup in 1970." Writing in 2009, Gary Burns commented that the Beatles continue to "enjoy a canonized status" unprecedented for popular musicians and that they are "canonical figures" in each of the three categories within the rock canon: sociological, literary and musicological. He identifies them as a key influence in the foundation of hundreds of organisations and publications dedicated to serious appreciation of rock music, including the Rock and Roll Hall of Fame, Cambridge University Press's journal Popular Music, the International Association for the Study of Popular Music, and the University of Liverpool's Institute of Popular Music. (Note: According to author Michael Frontani, the Beatles formed the basis of Jann Wenner's scope on countercultural issues when launching Rolling Stone magazine in late 1967. Wenner's beliefs of the Beatles' superiority as artists – argued predominately on the influence of Sgt. Pepper – were shared by many and repeated in the vast majority of articles for Rolling Stone, whilst the magazine itself maintained an influence and preeminence over every other rock journal founded in the decade.)

Hundreds of books have been written about the Beatles' career. Jonathan Gould says that the band "represent a bibliographical phenomenon as well as a musical one", with the group's history having become a folk tale that "has been put to many different uses by its many different narrators". He comments that the range and variety of literature is "all the more remarkable considering that, prior to the Beatles, not a single significant book had been written on the subject of rock 'n' roll". Burns states that the quality and preponderance of "scholarly, quasi-scholarly, journalistic, and fan attention" given to the band far surpasses that given to Bob Dylan, the Rolling Stones and the Beach Boys. In her book The Rock Canon, Carys Wyn Jones affords them an elevated status akin to Shakespeare's position of eminence in Harold Bloom's canon of Western literature.

Relevant scholarly studies range from discussions of the band's history and cultural impact to musicological work on such subjects as chord progressions, melody and automated analysis.

- In 2009, Liverpool Hope University started to offer a Master's degree in "The Beatles, Popular Music and Society". The program focuses on the political, social, and cultural aspects related to the Beatles and their music.
- In 2014, Thomson Reuters analyst and ScienceWatch editor Christopher King investigated 12,000 journals and books and found that 500 mentioned the Beatles in their topics or titles. (Note: Of these, the three most frequently cited were: I.E. Hyman; D.C. Rubin (1990). "Memorabeatlia - A naturalistic study of long-term memory". Memory & Cognition. 18 (2): 205–14. doi:10.3758/BF03197096. hdl:10161/10162. PMID 2319962. S2CID 16506774. (26 citations); C. Whissell (1996). "Traditional and emotional stylometric analysis of the songs of Beatles Paul McCartney and John Lennon". Computers and the Humanities. 30 (3): 257–265. doi:10.1007/BF00055109. S2CID 20632134. (15 citations); S. Cohen (1997). "More than the Beatles: Popular music, tourism and urban regeneration". Tourists and Tourism: Identifying with People and Places. (12 citations))
- A 2017 study of AllMusic's catalogue indicated the band as the most frequently cited artist influence in its database. Of the 2000 artists selected for the study, 1230 were stated to be influenced by the Beatles, ahead of Dylan, with 669.
- In 2019, a scientific study involving over 80,000 different chord progressions and conducted by the Max Planck Institute in Germany indicated "Ob-La-Di, Ob-La-Da" as "the perfect pop song" based on how enjoyable recipients found its chord changes. (Note: For the study, researchers gathered 700 songs recorded between 1958 and 1991 and played the various chord progressions to volunteers, absent from their music and lyrics.)
- In 2021, the University of Liverpool announced a "The Beatles: Music Industry and Heritage" MA, which would examine the group's influence on popular music and culture and how the band's influence could be replicated in different places, industries and contexts around the world. That same year, Liverpool University Press announced an upcoming Journal of Beatles Studies. The first issue was released in September 2022.

A 2026 study also found that The Beatles were having an impact on academic publishing. Researchers at Radboud University and the Delft University of Technology found that since the 1990s, at least 3200 peer-reviewed papers across various disciplines had titles quoting or making puns related to The Beatles' song names or lyrics, with 2237 exact matches and 963 wordplays. The researchers found that The Beatles were also the most quoted band and musician, ahead of Elvis Presley (195 references) and Michael Jackson (65 references).

Since the early 2000s, historian Mark Lewisohn has been writing The Beatles: All These Years, a three-part set of Beatles biographies whose first volume exceeds 1,700 pages. The impetus for the project was his disappointment that none of the group's biographies had approached a depth or breadth comparable to Robert A. Caro's ongoing book series, The Years of Lyndon Johnson.

=== 21st-century relevance ===
The Beatles continue to be viewed as representing the ideals of the 1960s. In Inglis's description, "their voices and faces were the most recognized symbols of the 'swinging sixties' and they became – and remain – the iconic images of the decade." In 2004, the band were the most-represented act in Rolling Stone's list of the "500 Greatest Songs of All Time", with seven out of 23 Beatles songs making the top 30. In 2009, Global Beatles Day was founded as an international celebration of the band's music and social message. The event takes place on 25 June each year in memory of the Our World performance of "All You Need Is Love".

Writing in The New York Times Magazine in 2016, cultural commentator Chuck Klosterman said that the group were "only slightly less popular now" than they were in the 1960s. He wrote that the group were "arguably" responsible for everything related to rock music, "including the very notion of a band's breaking up", and noted that no other rock group had faced unrelated assassination attempts against half its members. Klosterman concluded that, "In any reasonable world, the Beatles are the answer to the question 'Who will be the Sousa of rock?'"

In the 2000s, Elvis Presley had been the only other defunct musical act to generate as much continued news and interest as the Beatles. His mass appeal curtailed significantly by the end of the 2010s, while the Beatles' popularity has endured with younger generations. The amount of Google searches for "Beatles" spiked by 48.59% in 2019, relative to the previous four years. That same year, the Beatles' music was streamed on Spotify 1.7 billion times; 30% of listeners were between the ages of 18 and 24, followed by 25- to 29-year-olds, at 17%. In other words, almost half of listeners were aged under 30.

As of June 2019, "Yesterday" remained one of the most covered songs in the history of recorded music, with over 2,200 versions. According to figures published by Broadcast Music Incorporated (BMI), the song was played over 7 million times on American radio during the twentieth century. (Note: The BMI report placed "Yesterday" as the seventh most performed song of the century. The Beatles were also represented in this top 100 by "Something" at number 17 and "Michelle" at number 42 (both with over 5 million performances), and "Let It Be" at number 89 (over 4 million).)

A 2026 study published in PLOS One found that Beatles songs and lyrics appeared in academic article titles numerous times, "identifying 2,237 exact references and 963 instances of creative wordplay in data from Scopus."

== See also ==
- Outline of the Beatles
- The Beatles timeline
- List of awards and nominations received by the Beatles
- The Beatles in popular culture
- The Beatles in film
- Tributes to the Beatles
- Cultural impact of Elvis Presley

== Sources ==
- Austerlitz, Saul (2007). Money for Nothing: A History of the Music Video from the Beatles to the White Stripes. New York, NY: Continuum. ISBN 978-0-8264-1818-0.
- Babiuk, Andy (2002). Beatles Gear: All the Fab Four's Instruments, from Stage to Studio. San Francisco, CA: Backbeat Books. ISBN 978-0-87930-731-8.
- Badman, Keith (2001). The Beatles: Off the Record. London: Omnibus Press. ISBN 0711990093.
- Bellman, Jonathan (1998). The Exotic in Western Music. Lebanon, NH: Northeastern University Press. ISBN 1-55553-319-1.
- Bishop, Rand (2010). The Absolute Essentials of Songwriting Success – From Song Dog to Top Dog: Making It in the Music Business. Van Nuys, CA: Alfred Music Publishing. ISBN 978-0-7390-7191-5.
- Borack, John M. (2007). Shake Some Action: The Ultimate Power Pop Guide. Not Lame Recordings. ISBN 978-0979771408.
- Bray, Christopher (2014). 1965: The Year Modern Britain Was Born. London: Simon & Schuster. ISBN 978-1-84983-387-5.
- Brend, Mark (2005). Strange Sounds: Offbeat Instruments and Sonic Experiments in Pop. San Francisco, CA: Backbeat Books. ISBN 978-0-879308551.
- Bumsted, Allison (2024). TeenSet, Teen Fan Magazines, and Rock Journalism: Don't Let the Name Fool You. Jackson, MS: University Press of Mississippi. ISBN 978-1496853271.
- Bumsted, Allison (2025). "1960s Teen Fan Magazines and The Beatles: An Exploration of Community, Fandom, and the Beatles Narrative". Journal of 20th Century Media Studies. 3: 25–52.
- Burns, Gary (2000). "Refab Four: Beatles for Sale in the Age of Music Video". In Inglis, Ian (ed.). The Beatles, Popular Music and Society: A Thousand Voices. New York, NY: St. Martin's Press. ISBN 978-0-312-22236-9.
- Burns, Gary (2009). "Beatles News: Product Line Extensions and the Rock Canon". In Womack, Kenneth (ed.). The Cambridge Companion to the Beatles. Cambridge University Press. ISBN 978-1-139-82806-2.
- Cateforis, Theo (2011). Are We Not New Wave: Modern Pop at the Turn of the 1980s. University of Michigan Press. ISBN 978-0-472-03470-3.
- Clayson, Alan (2003a). George Harrison. London: Sanctuary. ISBN 1-86074-489-3.
- Clayson, Alan (2003b). Ringo Starr. London: Sanctuary. ISBN 1-86074-488-5.
- Cook, Nicholas; Pople, Anthony (2004). The Cambridge History of Twentieth-Century Music. Cambridge University Press. ISBN 978-0-521-66256-7.
- Cotner, John S. (2000). "Music Theory and Progressive Rock Style Analysis". Reflections on American Music: The Twentieth Century and the New Millennium. Pendragon Press. ISBN 978-1-57647-070-1.
- Courrier, Kevin (2009). Artificial Paradise: The Dark Side of the Beatles' Utopian Dream. Westport, CT: Praeger. ISBN 978-0-313-34586-9.
- DeRogatis, Jim (2003). Turn on Your Mind: Four Decades of Great Psychedelic Rock. Milwaukee, WI: Hal Leonard. ISBN 978-0-634-05548-5.
- Doggett, Peter (2007). There's a Riot Going On: Revolutionaries, Rock Stars, and the Rise and Fall of '60s Counter-Culture. Edinburgh, UK: Canongate Books. ISBN 978-1-84195-940-5.
- Doggett, Peter (2011). You Never Give Me Your Money: The Beatles After the Breakup. New York, NY: It Books. ISBN 978-0-06-177418-8.
- Doggett, Peter (2015). Electric Shock: From the Gramophone to the iPhone – 125 Years of Pop Music. London: The Bodley Head. ISBN 978-1-84792-218-2.
- Edmondson, Jacqueline (2013). Music in American Life: An Encyclopedia of the Songs, Styles, Stars, and Stories that Shaped our Culture. Santa Barbara, CA: ABC-CLIO. ISBN 978-0-313-39348-8.
- Everett, Walter (1999). The Beatles as Musicians: Revolver through the Anthology. Oxford and New York: Oxford University Press. ISBN 978-0-19-512941-0.
- Everett, Walter (2001). The Beatles as Musicians: The Quarry Men Through Rubber Soul. Oxford University Press. ISBN 978-0-19-514105-4.
- Fitzgerald, Jon (2000). "Lennon–McCartney and the Early British Invasion, 1964–6". In Inglis, Ian (ed.). The Beatles, Popular Music and Society: A Thousand Voices. New York, NY: St. Martin's Press. ISBN 978-0-312-22236-9.
- Fried, Goldie; Titone, Robin; Weiner, Sue (1980). The Beatles A-Z. Methuen. ISBN 978-0-416-00781-7.
- Frontani, Michael R. (2007). The Beatles: Image and the Media. Jackson, MS: University Press of Mississippi. ISBN 978-1-57806-965-1.
- Gendron, Bernard (2002). Between Montmartre and the Mudd Club: Popular Music and the Avant-Garde. Chicago, IL: University of Chicago Press. ISBN 978-0-226-28737-9.
- George-Warren, Holly (2001). The Rolling Stone Encyclopedia of Rock & Roll. New York, NY: Fireside/Rolling Stone Press. ISBN 0-7432-0120-5.
- Glynn, Stephen (2013). The British Pop Music Film: The Beatles and Beyond. Basingstoke, UK: Palgrave Macmillan. ISBN 978-0-230-39222-9.
- Goldberg, Philip (2010). American Veda: From Emerson and the Beatles to Yoga and Meditation – How Indian Spirituality Changed the West. New York, NY: Harmony Books. ISBN 978-0-385-52134-5.
- Gould, Jonathan (2007). Can't Buy Me Love: The Beatles, Britain and America. New York, NY: Three Rivers Press. ISBN 978-0-307-35338-2.
- Greene, Doyle (2016). Rock, Counterculture and the Avant-Garde, 1966–1970: How the Beatles, Frank Zappa and the Velvet Underground Defined an Era. Jefferson, NC: McFarland. ISBN 978-1-4766-6214-5.
- Harrington, Joe S. (2002). Sonic Cool: The Life & Death of Rock 'n' Roll. Milwaukee, WI: Hal Leonard. ISBN 978-0-634-02861-8.
- Harris, John (2003). "Cruel Britannia". Mojo Special Limited Edition: 1000 Days of Revolution (The Beatles' Final Years – Jan 1, 1968 to Sept 27, 1970). London: Emap. pp. 40–45.
- Harry, Bill (2000). The Beatles Encyclopedia: Revised and Updated. London: Virgin. ISBN 978-0-7535-0481-9.
- Hegarty, Paul; Halliwell, Martin (2011). Beyond and Before: Progressive Rock Since the 1960s. New York, NY: Continuum. ISBN 978-0-8264-2332-0.
- Hertsgaard, Mark (1996). A Day in the Life: The Music and Artistry of the Beatles. London: Pan Books. ISBN 0-330-33891-9.
- Hodgson, Jay (2010). Understanding Records: A Field Guide to Recording Practice. New York, NY: Continuum. ISBN 978-1-4411-5607-5.
- Holmes, Thom (2012). Electronic and Experimental Music: Technology, Music, and Culture (4th edn). New York, NY: Routledge. ISBN 978-0-415-89636-8.
- Howard, David N. (2004). Sonic Alchemy: Visionary Music Producers and Their Maverick Recordings. Milwaukee, WI: Hal Leonard. ISBN 978-0-634-05560-7.
- Hunt, Ken (2000). "India: East–West Fusions". World Music: The Rough Guide (Volume 2: Latin and North America, Caribbean, India, Asia and Pacific). London: Rough Guides/Penguin. ISBN 1-85828-636-0.
- Ingham, Chris (2006). The Rough Guide to the Beatles (2nd edn). London: Rough Guides/Penguin. ISBN 978-1-84836-525-4.
- Inglis, Ian (2008). "Cover Story: Magic, myth, and music". In Julien, Olivier (ed.). Sgt. Pepper and the Beatles: It Was Forty Years Ago Today. Ashgate. ISBN 978-0-7546-6708-7.
- Inglis, Ian (2010). "Historical Approaches to Merseybeat". In Leonard, Marion; Strachan, Robert (eds.). The Beat Goes On: Liverpool, Popular Music and the Changing City. Liverpool, UK: Liverpool University Press. ISBN 978-1-84631-190-1.
- Jackson, Andrew Grant (2015). 1965: The Most Revolutionary Year in Music. New York, NY: Thomas Dunne Books. ISBN 978-1-250-05962-8.
- Jones, Carys Wyn (2008). The Rock Canon. Ashgate. ISBN 978-0-7546-6244-0.
- Jones, Dylan (2014). The Eighties: One Day, One Decade. London: Windmill Books. ISBN 978-0-099559085.
- Jones, Steve, ed. (2002). Pop Music and the Press. Temple University Press. ISBN 9781566399661.
- Jovanovic, Rob (2004). Big Star: The Story of Rock's Forgotten Band. London: Fourth Estate. ISBN 978-0-00-714908-7.
- Julien, Olivier (2008). Sgt. Pepper and the Beatles: It Was Forty Years Ago Today. Aldershot, UK: Ashgate. ISBN 978-0-7546-6708-7.
- Kaiser, Charles (1988). 1968 in America: Music, Politics, Chaos, Counterculture, and the Shaping of a Generation. Grove Press. ISBN 978-0-8021-3530-8.
- Keister, Jay (2019). "Black Prog: Soul, Funk, Intellect and the Progressive Side of Black Music of the 1970s" (PDF). American Music Research Center Journal. 28: 5–22. Archived (PDF) from the original on 24 November 2020 – via colorado.edu.
- Kingsbury, Paul; McCall, Michael; Rumble, John W., eds. (2012). The Encyclopedia of Country Music. New York, NY: Oxford University Press. ISBN 978-0-19-539563-1.
- Kruth, John (2015). This Bird Has Flown: The Enduring Beauty of Rubber Soul, Fifty Years On. Milwaukee, WI: Backbeat Books. ISBN 978-1-61713-573-6.
- Lemlich, Jeffrey M. (1992). Savage Lost: Florida Garage Bands of the '60s and Beyond (First ed.). Plantation, FL: Distinctive Publishing Corporation. ISBN 0-942963-12-1.
- Larkin, Colin (2006). The Encyclopedia of Popular Music (4th edn). London: Oxford University Press. ISBN 978-0-19-531373-4.
- Lavezzoli, Peter (2006). The Dawn of Indian Music in the West. New York, NY: Continuum. ISBN 0-8264-2819-3.
- Leng, Simon (2006) [2003]. While My Guitar Gently Weeps: The Music of George Harrison. SAF Publishing Ltd. ISBN 978-1-4234-0609-9.
- Levy, Shawn (2002). Ready, Steady, Go!: Swinging London and the Invention of Cool. London: Fourth Estate. ISBN 978-1-84115-226-4.
- Lewisohn, Mark (1992). The Complete Beatles Chronicle: The Definitive Day-by-Day Guide to the Beatles' Entire Career (2010 ed.). Chicago: Chicago Review Press. ISBN 978-1-56976-534-0.
- Lindberg, Ulf; Guomundsson, Gestur; Michelsen, Morten; Weisethaunet, Hans (2005). Rock Criticism from the Beginning: Amusers, Bruisers, and Cool-Headed Cruisers. New York, NY: Peter Lang. ISBN 978-0-8204-7490-8.
- Loder, Kurt (8 June 1998). "The Time 100". Time. New York. Archived from the original on 22 August 2008.
- Luhrssen, David; Larson, Michael (2017). Encyclopedia of Classic Rock. Santa Barbara, CA: Greenwood. ISBN 978-1-4408-3513-1.
- Macan, Edward (1997). Rocking the Classics: English Progressive Rock and the Counterculture. Oxford University Press. ISBN 978-0-19-509887-7.
- MacDonald, Ian (2002a). "The Psychedelic Experience". Mojo Special Limited Edition: 1000 Days That Shook the World (The Psychedelic Beatles – April 1, 1965 to December 26, 1967). London: Emap. pp. 30–36.
- MacDonald, Ian (2002b). "A Perfect Match". Mojo Special Limited Edition: 1000 Days of Beatlemania (The Early Years – April 1, 1962 to December 31, 1964). London: Emap.
- MacDonald, Ian (2007). Revolution in the Head: The Beatles' Records and the Sixties. Chicago Review Press. p. 124. ISBN 978-1-55652-733-3.
- Marcus, Greil (1992) [1979]. "The Beatles". In DeCurtis, Anthony; Henke, James; George-Warren, Holly; Miller, Jim (eds.). The Rolling Stone Illustrated History of Rock & Roll: The Definitive History of the Most Important Artists and Their Music. New York, NY: Straight Arrow. ISBN 0-679-73728-6.
- Martin, Bill (1998). Listening to the Future: The Time of Progressive Rock. Open Court. ISBN 0-8126-9368-X.
- Martin, Bill (2015). Avant Rock: Experimental Music from the Beatles to Bjork. Open Court. ISBN 978-0-8126-9939-5.
- Marwick, Arthur (2012) [1998]. The Sixties: Cultural Revolution in Britain, France, Italy, and the United States. London: Bloomsbury Reader. ISBN 978-1-4482-0573-8.
- Miles, Barry (1998). Paul McCartney: Many Years from Now. New York, NY: Henry Holt and Company. p. 280. ISBN 978-0-8050-5249-7.
- Miles, Barry (2001). The Beatles Diary Volume 1: The Beatles Years. London: Omnibus Press. ISBN 0-7119-8308-9.
- Miles, Barry; Morgan, Johnny (2005). The Greatest Album Covers of All Time. London: Collins & Brown. ISBN 1843403013.
- Millard, André (2012). Beatlemania: Technology, Business, and Teen Culture in Cold War America. Baltimore, MD: Johns Hopkins University Press. ISBN 978-1-4214-0525-4.
- Miller, Terry E. (2000). "Overview". In Koskoff, Ellen (ed.). Garland Encyclopedia of World Music, Volume 3: The United States and Canada. Garland Publishing. ISBN 0-8240-4944-6.
- Moore, Allan F. (1997). The Beatles: Sgt. Pepper's Lonely Hearts Club Band. Cambridge, UK: Cambridge University Press. ISBN 978-0-521-57484-6.
- Moore, Allan F. (2016) [2012]. Song Means: Analysing and Interpreting Recorded Popular Song. Abingdon, UK; New York, NY: Routledge. ISBN 978-1-4094-3802-1.
- Morgan, Johnny; Wardle, Ben (2015) [2010]. The Art of the LP: Classic Album Covers 1955–1995. New York, NY: Sterling. ISBN 978-1-4549-1806-6.
- Neaverson, Bob (1997). The Beatles Movies. London: Cassell. ISBN 978-0-304337965. Archived from the original on 2 October 2009 – via beatlesmovies.co.uk (chapter: "Magical Mystery Tour Part 1 – Background and Production").
- Norman, Philip (1996) [1981]. Shout!: The Beatles in Their Generation. New York, NY: Fireside. ISBN 0-684-83067-1.
- Norman, Philip (2008). John Lennon: The Life. New York, NY: Ecco. ISBN 978-0-06-075402-0.
- Pedler, Dominic (2003). The Songwriting Secrets of the Beatles. London: Omnibus. ISBN 978-0-7119-8167-6.
- Philo, Simon (2015). British Invasion: The Crosscurrents of Musical Influence. Lanham, MD: Rowman & Littlefield. ISBN 978-0-8108-8627-8.
- Prendergast, Mark (2003). The Ambient Century: From Mahler to Moby – The Evolution of Sound in the Electronic Age. New York, NY: Bloomsbury. ISBN 1-58234-323-3.
- Reising, Russell; LeBlanc, Jim (2009). "Magical Mystery Tours, and Other Trips: Yellow submarines, newspaper taxis, and the Beatles' psychedelic years". In Womack, Kenneth (ed.). The Cambridge Companion to the Beatles. Cambridge, UK: Cambridge University Press. ISBN 978-0-521-68976-2.
- Riley, Tim (2002). Tell Me Why: The Beatles: Album by Album, Song by Song, the Sixties and After. Cambridge, MA: Da Capo Press. ISBN 978-0-306-81120-3.
- Roberts, Michael James (2014). Tell Tchaikovsky the News: Rock 'n' Roll, the Labor Question, and the Musicians' Union, 1942–1968. Durham, NC: Duke University Press. ISBN 978-0-8223-5475-8.
- Rodriguez, Robert (2012). Revolver: How the Beatles Reimagined Rock 'n' Roll. Milwaukee, WI: Backbeat Books. ISBN 978-1-61713-009-0.
- Romanowski, William D. (2006) [1996]. Pop Culture Wars: Religion and the Role of Entertainment in American Life. Eugene, OR: Wipf and Stock. ISBN 978-1-59752-577-0.
- Sanchez, Luis (2014). The Beach Boys' Smile. Bloomsbury Publishing. ISBN 978-1-62356-956-3.
- Savage, Jon (2015). 1966: The Year the Decade Exploded. London: Faber & Faber. ISBN 978-0-571-27763-6.
- Schaffner, Nicholas (1978). The Beatles Forever. McGraw-Hill. ISBN 0-07-055087-5.
- Schinder, Scott; Schwartz, Andy (2008). Icons of Rock: An Encyclopedia of the Legends Who Changed Music Forever. Westport, CT: Greenwood Press. ISBN 978-0-313-33845-8.
- Shahriari, Andrew (2016) [2011]. Popular World Music. Abingdon, UK; New York, NY: Routledge. ISBN 978-0-136128984.
- Sheffield, Rob (2017). Dreaming the Beatles: The Love Story of One Band and the Whole World. New York, NY: HarperCollins. ISBN 978-0-06-220765-4.
- Shouler, Kenneth; Anthony, Susai (2009). The Everything Hinduism Book: Learn the Traditions and Rituals of the "Religion of Peace". Avon, MA: Adams Media. ISBN 978-1-59869-862-6.
- Simonelli, David (2013). Working Class Heroes: Rock Music and British Society in the 1960s and 1970s. Lanham, MD: Lexington Books. ISBN 978-0-7391-7051-9.
- Smith, Chris (2009). 101 Albums That Changed Popular Music. New York, NY: Oxford University Press. ISBN 978-0-19-537371-4.
- Spitz, Bob (2013). Koepp, Stephen (ed.). The Beatles Invasion: The Inside Story of the Two-Week Tour That Rocked America. New York: Time Home Entertainment. ISBN 978-1618931146.
- Spitz, Bob (2005). The Beatles: The Biography. New York, NY: Little, Brown. ISBN 978-0-316-80352-6.
- Stanley, Bob (2014). Yeah! Yeah! Yeah!: The Story of Pop Music from Bill Haley to Beyoncé. New York, NY: W.W. Norton. ISBN 978-0-393-24269-0.
- Stark, Steven D. (2005). Meet the Beatles: A Cultural History of the Band That Shook Youth, Gender, and the World. New York, NY: HarperCollins. ISBN 978-0-06-000893-2.
- Tillery, Gary (2011). Working Class Mystic: A Spiritual Biography of George Harrison. Wheaton, IL: Quest Books. ISBN 978-0-8356-0900-5.
- Turner, Steve (1999). A Hard Day's Write: The Stories Behind Every Beatles Song. New York, NY: Carlton/HarperCollins. ISBN 0-06-273698-1.
- Turner, Steve (2016). Beatles '66: The Revolutionary Year. New York, NY: Ecco. ISBN 978-0-06-247558-9.
- Unterberger, Richie (2006). The Unreleased Beatles: Music & Film. Backbeat Books. ISBN 0-87930-892-3.
- Weber, Erin Torkelson (2016). The Beatles and the Historians: An Analysis of Writings About the Fab Four. McFarland. ISBN 978-1-4766-6266-4.
- Whiteley, Sheila; Sklower, Jedediah (13 May 2016). Countercultures and Popular Music. Routledge. ISBN 978-1-317-15892-9.
- Wiener, Jon (1991). Come Together: John Lennon in His Time. Urbana, IL: University of Illinois Press. ISBN 978-0-252-06131-8.
- Woffinden, Bob (1981). The Beatles Apart. London: Proteus. ISBN 0-906071-89-5.
- Womack, Kenneth; Davis, Todd F. (2012). Reading the Beatles: Cultural Studies, Literary Criticism, and the Fab Four. SUNY Press. ISBN 978-0-7914-8196-7.
