= Barbara Dickson discography =

- Studio albums: 28
- EPs: 4
- Live albums: 8
- Compilation albums: 13
- Singles: 42
- Cast recording albums: 6

This is the discography of British singer Barbara Dickson.

== Albums ==
=== Studio albums ===
Title	Album details	Peak chart positions			Certifications
Title	Album details	UK	UK Indie	NL	Certifications
The Fate o' Charlie (with Archie Fisher and John MacKinnon)	Released: 1969; Label: Trailer; Formats: LP	—	—	—	
Thro' the Recent Years (with Archie Fisher)	Released: 1970; Label: Decca; Formats: LP	—	—	—	
Do Right Woman	Released: February 1971; Label: Decca; Formats: LP	—	—	—	
From the Beggar's Mantle...Fringed with Gold	Released: 1972; Label: Decca; Formats: LP	—	—	—	
Answer Me	Released: 1 April 1976; Label: RSO; Formats: LP, MC	—	—	—	
Morning Comes Quickly	Released: 23 May 1977; Label: RSO; Formats: LP, MC	58	—	—	
Sweet Oasis	Released: 10 November 1978; Label: CBS; Formats: LP, MC	—	—	—	
The Barbara Dickson Album	Released: 4 April 1980; Label: RSO; Formats: LP, MC	7	—	—	BPI: Gold
You Know It's Me	Released: 8 May 1981; Label: Epic; Formats: LP, MC	39	—	—	
All for a Song	Released: 15 January 1982; Label: Epic; Formats: LP, MC	3	—	42	BPI: Platinum
Heartbeats	Released: 19 June 1984; Label: Epic; Formats: LP, MC	21	—	—	
Gold	Released: November 1985; Label: K-tel; Formats: CD, LP, MC	11	—	—	BPI: Gold
The Right Moment	Released: 24 November 1986; Label: K-tel; Formats: CD, LP, MC	39	—	—	BPI: Gold
Coming Alive Again	Released: 24 April 1989; Label: Telstar; Formats: CD, LP, MC	30	—	—	
Don't Think Twice It's Alright	Released: 3 August 1992; Label: Columbia; Formats: CD, MC	32	—	—	
Parcel of Rogues	Released: 21 February 1994; Label: Castle Communications; Formats: CD, MC	30	—	—	
Dark End of the Street	Released: 13 November 1995; Label: Transatlantic; Formats: CD	94	—	—	
The 7 Ages of Woman	Released: 1998; Label: Telstar; Formats: CD	—	—	—	
For the Record	Released: 6 May 2002; Label: Eagle; Formats: CD	—	—	—	
Full Circle	Released: 20 September 2004; Label: RandM; Formats: CD	—	—	—	
Nothing's Gonna Change My World	Released: 4 September 2006; Label: Universal; Formats: CD	108	—	—	
Time & Tide	Released: 21 January 2008; Label: Voiceprint; Formats: CD	—	36	—	
Words Unspoken	Released: 31 January 2011; Label: Greentrax; Formats: CD	—	—	—	
To Each & Everyone – The Songs of Gerry Rafferty	Released: 1 September 2013; Label: Greentrax; Formats: CD	135	30	—	
Winter	Released: 8 December 2014; Label: Chariot Music; Formats: CD	—	—	—	
Through Line	Released: 7 September 2018; Label: Chariot Music; Formats: CD	—	—	—	
Time Is Going Faster	Released: 30 October 2020; Label: Chariot Music; Formats: CD, LP, digital download	—	—	—	
My Own Adventure	Released: 1 December 2023; Label: Chariot Music; Formats: CD, LP, digital download	—	—	—	
"—" denotes releases that did not chart or were not released in that territory.

=== Live albums ===
Title	Album details
Here We Go	Released: 14 October 1982; Label: Epic; Formats: LP, MC
After Dark	Released: 26 October 1987; Label: Theobald Dickson; Formats: CD, MC
Barbara Dickson in Concert	Released: 6 April 2009; Label: Chariot Music; Formats: 2xCD
B4 Seventy-Four – The Folkclub Tapes	Released: 8 January 2013; Label: Chariot Music; Formats: 2xCD
Live in Concert 1976 & 77	Released: 9 December 2016; Label: Chariot Music; Formats: CD+DVD
In Good Company – Live 2017	Released: 27 October 2017; Label: Chariot Music; Formats: CD
Ballads and Blether	Released: 28 April 2021; Label: Chariot Music; Formats: CD+DVD
47 Years Later: Live in Concert	Released: 13 September 2024; Label: Chariot Music; Formats: CD

=== Compilation albums ===
Title	Album details	Peak chart positions	Certifications
Title	Album details	UK	Certifications
I Will Sing	Released: August 1981; Label: Decca; Formats: LP	—	
Barbara Dickson	Released: October 1982; Label: Contour; Formats: LP	—	
The Barbara Dickson Songbook	Released: December 1984; Label: K-tel; Formats: LP, MC, CD	5	BPI: Gold
The Very Best of Barbara Dickson	Released: October 1986; Label: Telstar; Formats: LP, MC	78	
The Collection	Released: 28 September 1987; Label: Castle Communications; Formats: CD, 2xLP, MC	—	
Now and Then	Released: 1991; Label: Connoisseur Collection; Formats: CD, MC	—	
Together – The Best of Elaine Paige & Barbara Dickson	Released: November 1992; Label: Telstar; Formats: CD, LP, MC	22	
The Best of Barbara Dickson	Released: 12 February 1996; Label: Epic; Formats: CD	—	BPI: Gold
Memories	Released: 2 September 2003; Label: Music Club; Formats: CD	—	
The Platinum Collection	Released: 8 March 2004; Label: Sony Music TV; Formats: CD	35	
The Barbara Dickson Collection	Released: 17 April 2006; Label: Metro; Formats: CD	—	
The Collection	Released: 23 April 2007; Label: Sony BMG Music; Formats: CD	—	
The Essential	Released: 7 February 2011; Label: Metro; Formats: 2xCD	—	
"—" denotes releases that did not chart or were not released in that territory.

=== Cast recording albums ===
Title	Album details	Peak chart positions		Certifications
Title	Album details	UK	UK Indie	Certifications
John, Paul, George, Ringo... & Bert	Released: 8 November 1974; Label: RSO; Formats: LP, MC, 8-track; Original London cast recording from the musical of the same name	—	—	
Evita	Released: 19 November 1976; Label: MCA; Formats: 2xLP, 2xMC, 8-track; Concept cast recording for the musical of the same name	4	—	BPI: Gold
Blood Brothers	Released: 1983; Label: Legacy; Formats: LP; Original London cast recording from the musical of the same name	—	17	
Tell Me It's Not True	Released: July 1983; Label: Legacy; Formats: LP; Mini-album of songs from the musical Blood Brothers	100	—	
Chess	Released: October 1984; Label: RCA; Formats: 2xCD, 2xLP, 2xMC; Concept cast recording for the musical of the same name	10	—	BPI: Gold
Spend Spend Spend	Released: 2000; Label: Garforth; Formats: CD; Original London cast recording from the musical of the same name	—	—	
"—" denotes releases that did not chart or were not released in that territory.

== EPs ==
Title	Album details
All for a Song	Released: December 1981; Label: Epic; Promo-only release for the compilation album of the same name
Greatest Original Hits – 4 Track E.P.	Released: 20 August 1982; Label: Epic
Reunited (with Rab Noakes)	Released: 8 April 2014; Label: Neon
Five Songs	Released: 2016; Label: Chariot Music

== Singles ==
Title	Year	Peak chart positions										Album
Title	Year	UK	AUS	BEL (FL)	GER	IRE	NL	NZ	SA	SWI	US Bub.	Album
"Here Comes the Sun"	1974	—	—	—	—	—	—	—	—	—	—	Non-album singles
"Blue Skies"	1975	—	—	—	—	—	—	—	—	—	—	Non-album singles
"Answer Me"	1975	9	—	—	—	—	—	—	—	—	—	Answer Me
"People Get Ready"	1976	—	—	—	—	—	—	—	—	—	—	Answer Me
"Out of Love with Love"	1976	—	—	—	—	—	—	—	—	—	—	Non-album single
"Another Suitcase In Another Hall"	1977	18	—	—	—	—	—	—	—	—	—	Evita
"Lover's Serenade"	1977	—	—	—	—	—	—	—	—	—	—	Morning Comes Quickly
"Who Was It Stole Your Heart Away" (US and Canada-only release)	1977	—	—	—	—	—	—	—	—	—	20	Morning Comes Quickly
"I Could Fall"	1977	—	—	—	—	—	—	—	—	—	—	Morning Comes Quickly
"City to City"	1978	—	—	—	—	—	—	—	—	—	—	Sweet Oasis
"Fallen Angel"	1978	—	—	—	—	—	—	—	—	—	—	Sweet Oasis
"Come Back with the Same Look in Your Eyes"	1979	—	—	—	—	—	—	—	—	—	—	Non-album singles
"Caravan Song"	1979	41	—	—	—	—	—	—	8	—	—	Non-album singles
"January February"	1980	11	64	—	12	6	33	—	9	—	—	The Barbara Dickson Album
"Anytime (You're Down and Out)" (US-only release)	1980	—	—	—	—	—	—	—	—	—	—	The Barbara Dickson Album
"In the Night"	1980	48	—	—	—	—	—	—	—	—	—	The Barbara Dickson Album
"Only Seventeen"	1981	—	—	—	—	—	—	—	—	—	—	You Know It's Me
"My Heart Lies"	1981	—	—	—	—	—	36	—	—	—	—	You Know It's Me
"Run Like the Wind"	1981	—	—	—	—	—	—	—	—	—	—	All for a Song
"Take Good Care"	1982	—	—	—	—	—	—	—	—	—	—	All for a Song
"I Believe in You"	1982	—	—	—	—	—	—	—	—	—	—	All for a Song
"Here We Go"	1982	—	—	—	—	—	—	—	—	—	—	Here We Go
"Stop in the Name of Love"	1983	—	—	29	—	—	—	—	—	—	—	Heartbeats
"Tell Me It's Not True"	1983	—	—	—	—	—	—	—	—	—	—	Heartbeats
"Keeping My Love for You"	1984	97	—	—	—	—	—	—	—	—	—	Heartbeats
"I Don't Believe in Miracles"	1984	—	—	—	—	—	—	—	—	—	—	Heartbeats
"I Know Him So Well" (with Elaine Paige)	1984	1	21	13	22	1	16	9	2	7	—	Gold
"Still in the Game"	1985	—	—	—	—	—	—	—	—	—	—	The Barbara Dickson Songbook
"If You're Right"	1986	—	—	—	—	—	—	—	—	—	—	The Barbara Dickson Songbook
"Time After Time"	1986	78	—	—	—	—	—	—	—	—	—	The Right Moment
"I Think It's Going to Rain Today"	1987	—	—	—	—	—	—	—	—	—	—	After Dark
"The West Coast of Clare" (Ireland-only release)	1987	—	—	—	—	—	—	—	—	—	—	Non-album single
"Only a Dream in Rio"	1988	—	—	—	—	—	—	—	—	—	—	After Dark
"Coming Alive Again"	1989	—	—	—	—	—	—	—	—	—	—	Coming Alive Again
"All I Ask of You" (with José Carreras)	1989	—	—	—	—	—	—	—	—	—	—	José Carreras Sings Andrew Lloyd Webber
"You're the Voice" (Netherlands-only release)	1990	—	—	—	—	—	—	—	—	—	—	Coming Alive Again
"Tears of Rage"	1991	—	—	—	—	—	—	—	—	—	—	Non-album single
"Don't Think Twice It's All Right"	1992	95	—	—	—	—	—	—	—	—	—	Don't Think Twice It's Alright
"Blowin' in the Wind"	1992	94	—	—	—	—	—	—	—	—	—	Don't Think Twice It's Alright
"Love Hurts"	1995	99	—	—	—	—	—	—	—	—	—	Dark End of the Street
"I Will" (promo-only release)	2006	—	—	—	—	—	—	—	—	—	—	Nothing's Gonna Change My World
"Where Shadows Meet the Light"	2020	—	—	—	—	—	—	—	—	—	—	Time Is Going Faster
"—" denotes releases that did not chart or were not released in that territory.
