= Forever Friends =

Forever Friends may refer to:

- Forever Friends (brand), a teddy bear-themed brand of Hallmark Cards
- Forever Friends (film), a 1996 Taiwanese comedy war film
- "Forever Friends" (song), a song written for the 2008 Summer Olympics
- "Forever Friends", a song by Fiona Fung from A Little Love, 2008
- "Forever Friends", a song by Cookies from Happy Birthday, 2002

== See also ==
- Friends Forever (disambiguation)
