= A Little Love =

A Little Love may refer to:

== Films ==
- Sillunu Oru Kaadhal (lit. 'A Little Love'), a 2006 Indian Tamil-language film by N. Krishna
- Thoda Pyaar Thoda Magic (lit. 'A Little Love A Little Magic'), a 2008 Indian Hindi-language film

== Albums ==
- A Little Love (album), 2008 by Fiona Fung
- A Little Love, a 1982 album by Aurra

== Songs ==
- "A Little Love" (song), 2020 by Celeste
- "A Little Love", song by Aurra from the album A Little Love (album), 1982
- "A Little Love", song by Fiona Fung from the album A Little Love, 2008
- "A Little Love", song by Corey Hart from Bang! 1990
- "A Little Love", song by Neon Philharmonic 1971
- "A Little Love", song by Peter Tosh from Can't Blame the Youth
- "A Little Love", song by Juice Newton 1984
- "A Little Love", song by Bryan Adams from Unplugged

== See also ==
- Just a Little Love, album by Reba McEntire
- Give a Little Love (Judds album)
- You Gotta Take a Little Love, a 1969 album by jazz pianist Horace Silver
- Try a Little Love, album by Sam Cooke
- "Just a Little Love" (song), by Reba McEntire
- "Shine a Little Love", a 1979 song by Electric Light Orchestra
- "A Little in Love", song by Cliff Richard from 1980 album I'm No Hero
