= Jazzwise Publications Limited =

Defunct publisher and education company from the UK specialized in jazz

Jazzwise Publications Limited was a UK-based specialist jazz music publisher and education company. It was founded in 1984 as a mail-order company promoting jazz and improvisation through catalogues and short courses, and workshops for musicians. Jazzwise had three main areas of interest: Jazzwise Education, which runs an annual Summer School for jazz musicians; Jazzwise Direct, which publishes and sells sheet music, books, software, and other music-related items; and Jazzwise, the biggest-selling jazz magazine in Britain.

The Jazzwise brand and Jazzwise magazine were acquired in February 2013 by MA Business & Leisure, a division of Mark Allen Group. The Jazzwise Education and Jazzwise Direct brands were retained by the original owner and renamed SendMeMusic.

== Jazzwise education ==
Jazzwise Education ran the Jazzwise Summer School nearly every year from 1984 to 2011. The course was originally located at Goldsmiths' College, but moved to Richmond in 1995. The Director of the Jazzwise Summer School was the noted US jazz educator Jamey Aebersold, and the teaching faculty included around twenty prominent US and UK jazz educators. Over 1,500 students attended the Jazzwise Summer Schools. These included amateur and professional musicians from the UK and other parts of the world, who played typical jazz instruments such as trumpet, saxophone, trombone, piano, guitar, double bass, and drums. The course aimed to assist participants in developing their skills as jazz players, particularly jazz improvisation. Students received instrumental tuition and instruction in harmony and ear training, and played for several hours each day in jazz bands ('combos') under tutor guidance.

== SendMeMusic ==
SendMeMusic (formerly Jazzwise Direct) publishes and distributes instructional jazz books, play-alongs, song collections (including fakebooks and Real Books), music software, and DVD media. Its customer base includes musicians from beginner to experienced professional, schools and colleges, and band directors. It also owns and publishes London Orchestrations, a large collection of sheet music for bands, which includes over 1,300 titles for 17-piece big band and 9-piece pop/rock groups. The series features arrangements and medleys from swing charts of the 1940s through to rock hits of the 1990s, with a particular focus on the big band vocal charts of Frank Sinatra and Michael Bublé. London Orchestrations are distributed throughout Europe and Australia but are not available in the US because of copyright restrictions.

Jazzwise Direct commenced online trading in 2003 through the Jazzwise Online Store, now sendmemusic.com. The site promotes products recommended by the staff (many of whom are musicians themselves) and also features free 'how-to' articles incorporating these recommendations. Customers receive updates via mailed print catalogues and emailed newsletters.

== Jazzwise magazine ==
Jazzwise, launched in 1997, is the UK's biggest selling jazz monthly magazine. Jazzwise has a broad coverage, from the cutting edge of jazz, improv, bebop, spiritual jazz and jazz-rock to world music, soul jazz, jazz funk, M-BASE, acid jazz and prog jazz. It features news coverage, a national gig guide, gossip column, a jazz-on-film page, opinion column, in-depth features and a review section covering new CD releases, reissues, DVDs, books and live reviews. Breaking news stories feature on the Jazzwise magazine website. Jazzwise also mentors new jazz writers through its ongoing intern scheme and the Write Stuff workshops held each November during the London Jazz Festival.

In 2006 Jazzwise editor Jon Newey was judged journalist of the year at the Parliamentary Jazz Awards. In 2007 Jazzwise won two awards, best jazz publication at the Parliamentary Jazz Awards and best jazz publication at the Ronnie Scott's awards. In 2009, Jazzwise writer Kevin Le Gendre won journalist of the year at the Parliamentary Jazz Awards, while in 2010 Jazzwise won best jazz publication at the Parliamentary Jazz Awards for the second time and gig guide editor Mike Flynn won journalist of the year, while CD reissues reviewer Alyn Shipton won broadcaster of the year.
