= All for a Song =

Studio album by Barbara Dickson
- Released: 15 January 1982
- Recorded: 1975–1981
- Genre: Pop, MOR
- Label: Epic
- Producer: Mike Batt, Alan Tarney, Barbara Dickson and others

Barbara Dickson chronology
You Know it's Me (1981)	All for a Song (1982)	Here We Go - Live on Tour (1982)

Alternative cover
- Original version of the album, released in Scotland and Ireland

All for a Song is a 1982 album by Barbara Dickson. The album was made up of mostly new recordings, but included four of her past hits.

== Background ==
Following the success of her 1980 album, but relative failure of her next album, Epic Records decided to take no chances with this release and included four of her past hits on the collection and backed it up with a TV advertising campaign. This resulted in All for a Song becoming the most successful album of Dickson's career. The album peaked at No.3 in the UK and spent most of the year in the charts, eventually going platinum for sales of over 300,000 copies in the UK alone.

Past singles included on the album were "Answer Me", "Another Suitcase in Another Hall", "Caravan Song" and "January February", while contemporary singles released from the album were "Run Like the Wind", "Take Good Care" and "I Believe in You". This was the first album to include "Caravan Song", which had been released in 1979 and was one of Dickson's most well-known songs. "Run Like the Wind" had originally been written by Mike Batt for the film Watership Down, but was replaced by "Bright Eyes".

The album cover proved to be a problem when, on doing research, the record company decided that cover photographs with a lot of blue did not tend to sell well and despite the fact that the album sleeves had already been printed, they were rejected in favour of an alternative shot with warmer shades (see illustrations, right). The rejected covers were instead sold in Scotland and Ireland.

The album was largely recorded in the Netherlands with producer Mike Batt. Alan Tarney, the producer of her previous two albums was only used on one new track, while Dickson herself produced covers of The Beatles tracks, "The Long and Winding Road" and "With a Little Help from My Friends".

All for a Song was released twice in the Netherlands under different titles, first as I Believe in You and shortly after as Run Like the Wind. The latter reached No.42 in the Dutch album charts. To date, the album has never been released on Compact disc, although many of the tracks have appeared on compilations.

In April 2022, 'All For A Song' was released on CD for the first time as a two-disc remastered Special Edition, featuring 21 bonus tracks. The CD was available only via Barbara's official website.

== Track listing ==
Side One

1. "Run Like the Wind" (Mike Batt)
2. "Caravan Song" (Mike Batt)
3. "Answer Me" (Gerhard Winkler, Fred Rauch, Carl Sigman)
4. "The Long and Winding Road" (John Lennon, Paul McCartney)
5. "Tonight" (Dickson)
6. "With A Little Help From My Friends" (Lennon, McCartney)

Side Two

1. "January February" (Alan Tarney)
2. "Will You Love Me Tomorrow" (Gerry Goffin, Carole King)
3. "Take Good Care" (Paul Bliss)
4. "I Believe in You" (Dickson)
5. "Another Suitcase in Another Hall" (Andrew Lloyd Webber, Tim Rice)
6. "Surrender to the Sun" (Mike Batt)

== Personnel ==
Producers:

- Mike Batt ("Run Like the Wind", "Caravan Song", "Tonight", "Surrender to the Sun")
- Junior Campbell ("Answer Me")
- Barbara Dickson ("The Long and Winding Road", "With a Little Help from My Friends")
- Alan Tarney ("January February", "Will You Love Me Tomorrow", "I Believe in You")
- Andrew Lloyd Webber & Tim Rice ("Another Suitcase in Another Hall")
- Paul Bliss ("Take Good Care")
