= Stages (Melanie C album) =

2012 album by Melanie C

Studio album by Melanie C
- Released: 7 September 2012
- Recorded: 2010–2012
- Genre: Theatrical pop
- Length: 45:15
- Labels: Red Girl; Universal UK
- Producer: Peter-John Vettese

Melanie C chronology
The Night (2012)	Stages (2012)	Live at Shepherd's Bush Empire (2013)

Singles from Stages
- 1. "I Know Him So Well" Released: 11 November 2012

Stages is the sixth studio album by the English singer Melanie C, released on 7 September 2012 by Red Girl Records and Universal UK. A cover album, it features a collection of song covers from various musical theatre shows and films, which consequently makes it Chisholm's first studio album where she holds no writing credits whatsoever to any of the tracks. The album was supported by one single, a cover of "I Know Him So Well", featuring fellow English singer and Spice Girls member Emma Bunton.

== Background ==
On 25 June 2012 it was announced on her official website that Chisholm was in the process of putting the finishing touches on her upcoming album, to be called Stages. The record was to be produced by her longtime collaborator Peter-John Vettese, and features a collection of songs from the theatre that have been important to Chisholm at various stages of her life.

On 6 July 2012, after a succession of mysterious tweets between Chisholm and her former Spice Girls group mate Emma Bunton, it was revealed that the two had recorded a song together for Chisholm's upcoming album. The song "I Know Him So Well" from the musical Chess, was to be a duet featuring the two.

The original artwork for the album featured Chisholm sitting in a black leather chair. Alongside the album's track list, it was unveiled on 21 July 2012. It was later reported that this art would serve only for digital versions of the album and a photograph of Chisholm walking down stairs would serve as the image for physical releases. However, the latter image ended up being used for both physical and digital releases.

== Promotion ==
To increase the sales of the album, Chisholm held an album signing sessions on HMV. In September 2012 and October 2012, she visited six HMV stores to sign the copies of her album Stages. Chisholm also performed the album track "I Don't Know How to Love Him" on This Morning, QVC, Superstar and The Late Late Show. Chisholm also performed at "Beats at the Beach" in Abu Dhabi on 1 November 2012 as part of Yasalam 2012.

== Singles ==
"I Don't Know How to Love Him", a song taken from the rock opera Jesus Christ Superstar, was released on 22 July 2012 as a digital download on iTunes, serving as a special preview for the album. The song peaked at number twenty in the Official UK Indie Chart.

The official lead single from the album, "I Know Him So Well" was released on 11 November 2012. The single features Emma Bunton, Chisholm's groupmate from the Spice Girls. Chisholm and Bunton performed the song live on various TV shows such as Loose Women, This Morning, The Alan Titchmarsh Show, and the BBC Children in Need 2012 concert. The single reached #153 in the Official UK Top 200 singles chart. The b-side of the single is a cover of "You'll Never Walk Alone" from the musical Carousel.

== Critical reception ==
Professional ratings
Review scores
Source	Rating
Daily Express	3/5 stars

The Daily Express rated the album three out of five stars. The daily newspaper wrote: "Melanie C has become a bit of a West End Wendy [..] which makes this album of covers of mainly show tunes more than appropriate [...] It’s a great selection but perhaps the most enjoyable moment is when Emma Bunton joins her on a cover of the Elaine Paige/Barbara Dickson classic "I Know Him So Well"."

== Chart performance ==
Stages debuted and peaked at number 50 on the UK Albums Chart, giving Chisholm her sixth consecutive entry in the Official Albums Chart Top 100. The album also reached the top ten on the Official UK Indie Album Chart, at number seven.

== Track listing ==
All tracks produced by Peter-John Vettese.

Stages track listing
No.	Title	Writer(s)	Length
1.	"Maybe This Time" (from Cabaret, 1966)	John Kander; Fred Ebb	3:37
2.	"Another Hundred People" (from Company, 1970)	Stephen Sondheim	2:47
3.	"I Know Him So Well" (featuring Emma Bunton) (from Chess, 1984)	Björn Ulvaeus; Benny Andersson; Tim Rice	4:24
4.	"Aren't You Kinda Glad We Did?" (from The Shocking Miss Pilgrim, 1947)	George Gershwin; Ira Gershwin	3:12
5.	"I Don't Know How to Love Him" (from Jesus Christ Superstar, 1970)	Andrew Lloyd Webber; Rice	5:22
6.	"Both Sides Now" (from Priscilla, Queen of the Desert, 2006)	Joni Mitchell	5:01
7.	"Ain't Got No, I Got Life" (from Hair, 1967)	Galt MacDermot; Gerome Ragni; James Rado	3:09
8.	"I Just Don't Know What to Do With Myself" (from Shout! The Mod Musical, 2000)	Burt Bacharach; Hal David	3:24
9.	"I Only Have Eyes for You" (from Dames, 1934)	Al Dubin; Harry Warren	3:20
10.	"Tell Me It's Not True" (from Blood Brothers, 1983)	Willy Russell	5:09
11.	"My Funny Valentine" (from Babes in Arms, 1937)	Lorenz Hart; Richard Rodgers	2:57
12.	"Something Wonderful" (from The King and I, 1951)	Oscar Hammerstein II; Rodgers	2:52

iTunes bonus track
No.	Title	Writer(s)	Length
13.	"Anything Goes" (from Anything Goes, 1934)	Cole Porter	2:57

== Charts ==
Chart performance for Stages
Chart (2012)	Peak position
Irish Albums (IRMA)	83
Scottish Albums (Official Charts)	79
UK Albums (Official Charts)	50
UK Independent Albums (Official Charts)	7

== Release history ==
Release history for Stages
Region	Date	Format(s)	Label	Ref.
Various	9 September 2012	CD; digital download	Red Girl	
