= You Know It's Me =

You know it's Me

Studio album by Barbara Dickson
- Released: May 1981
- Recorded: September 1980 – March 1981
- Genre: Pop, MOR
- Label: Epic
- Producer: Alan Tarney

Barbara Dickson chronology
| The Barbara Dickson Album (1980) | You know it's Me (1981) | All for a Song (1982) |

You Know it's Me is the seventh solo studio album by Scottish singer Barbara Dickson, released in 1981.

This was the second album by Dickson to be produced by Alan Tarney, following the success of the previous one. You Know it's Me wasn't as big a hit however, reaching No.39 in the UK charts and failing to produce a hit single, despite being a firm fan favourite. Singles released from the album were the upbeat "Only Seventeen" and the ballad "My Heart Lies" (which reached No. 36 on the singles chart in The Netherlands).

The album was re-issued on cassette a year later in a double-pack with her 1978 album Sweet Oasis and on Compact disc in 1993.

== Track listing ==
Side One

1. "Think it Over" (Alan Tarney) 3.38
2. "Little by Little in Love" (Alan Tarney) 3.41
3. "You Know it's Me" (Barbara Dickson) 3.44
4. "Hold On" (Alan Tarney) 4.15
5. "We'll Believe in Lovin'" (Alan Tarney) 3.43

Side Two

1. "Only Seventeen" (Alan Tarney) 4.10
2. "You Got Me" (Barbara Dickson, Jeff Seopardie) 3.33
3. "I Know You, You Know Me" (Barbara Dickson) 2.53
4. "I Believe in You" (Barbara Dickson) 4.25
5. "My Heart Lies" (Alan Tarney) 2.25

== Personnel ==
Musicians:

- Alan Tarney
- Trevor Spencer
- Jeff Seopardie
- Isaac Guillory
- Ian Lynn
- Gary Twigg
- Recorded at Riverside Recordings and RG Jones Recording Studios
- Engineers - Nick Sykes, Nick Glennie-Smith, Ashley Howe
