= Gold (Barbara Dickson album) =

Studio album by Barbara Dickson
- Released: 18 November 1985
- Recorded: 1984–1985
- Studio: RAK; Chipping Norton Studios
- Genre: Pop; MOR
- Label: K-tel
- Producer: Pip Williams; Tim Rice; Benny Andersson; Björn Ulvaeus

Barbara Dickson chronology
| The Barbara Dickson Songbook (1984) | Gold (1985) | The Right Moment (1986) |

Gold is an album by British singer Barbara Dickson, released in 1985. The album contains a mix of cover versions and original tracks, including the UK number one single "I Know Him So Well", a duet with Elaine Paige. A second single, "If You're Right", was released in 1986, but it failed to chart.

== Track listing ==
1. "I Know Him So Well" (Benny Andersson, Björn Ulvaeus, Tim Rice)
2. "Missing You" (John Waite, Mark Leonard, Chas Sandford)
3. "Another Good Day for Goodbye" (Barbara Dickson, Charlie Dore)
4. "Touch Touch" (Richard Brunton, Pete Sinfield)
5. "Anyone Who Had a Heart" (Burt Bacharach, Hal David)
6. "A Day in the Life" (John Lennon, Paul McCartney)
7. "You Send Me" (Sam Cooke)
8. "What Is Love" (Howard Jones, Bill Bryant)
9. "Rivals" (Barbara Dickson, Charlie Dore)
10. "Soldiers" (Benny Andersson, Björn Ulvaeus)
11. "Rising Water" (Ian Lynn, K. Hain)
12. "Taking the Next Train Home" (M. Marra)
13. "If You're Right" (Andy Hill, Pete Sinfield)

== Charts ==
| Chart (1985) | Peak position |
|---|---|
| UK Albums Chart | 11 |

== Certifications ==
| Region | Certification | Certified units/sales |
|---|---|---|
| United Kingdom (BPI) | Platinum | 300,000^{^} |
^{^} Shipments figures based on certification alone.
