= Jazzwise =

British monthly jazz magazine

- Editor: Mike Flynn
- Categories: Jazz
- Frequency: Monthly
- Publisher: Mark Allen Group
- Founded: 1997; 28 years ago
- Country: United Kingdom
- Based in: London
- Language: English
- Website: jazzwisemagazine.com
- ISSN: 1368-0021

Jazzwise is a British monthly magazine focused on jazz, launched in 1997. The magazine covers a range of jazz sub-genres and provides news coverage, a national gig guide, a jazz-on-film page, feature articles, and a review section that evaluates new musical releases, DVDs, books, and live performances. News stories also feature on the Jazzwise magazine website. Jazzwise instructs new jazz writers through its ongoing intern scheme and The Write Stuff workshops held each November during the London Jazz Festival.

== Awards ==
In 2006, Jazzwise editor Jon Newey won Journalist of the Year at the Parliamentary Jazz Awards.

In 2007, Jazzwise won two awards – Best Jazz Publication at the Parliamentary Jazz Awards and Best Jazz Publication at the Ronnie Scott's awards.

In 2009, Jazzwise writer Kevin Le Gendre won Journalist of the Year at the Parliamentary Jazz Awards. In 2010, Jazzwise won Best Jazz Publication for the second time, gig guide editor Mike Flynn won Journalist of the Year, and CD reissues reviewer Alyn Shipton won Broadcaster of the Year.

In 2012, editor Jon Newey won the Parliamentary Jazz Award for Journalist of the Year for a second time, and in January 2013, Jazzwise won the Best Jazz Media Accolade at the Jazz FM awards.

Jazzwise was initially part of Jazzwise Publications Limited. The Jazzwise brand and magazine were acquired in February 2013 by MA Business & Leisure, a division of Mark Allen Group. The Jazzwise Education and Jazzwise Direct brand were retained by the original owner and renamed SendMeMusic.

== Sources ==
- "The Insider: Jazzwise". Music Week. CMP Information Ltd. 24 March 2007.
