= The Barbara Dickson Album =

Studio album by Barbara Dickson
- Released: 3 April 1980
- Genres: Pop, MOR
- Label: Epic
- Producer: Alan Tarney

Barbara Dickson chronology
Sweet Oasis (1978)	The Barbara Dickson Album (1980)	You Know it's Me (1981)

Professional ratings
Review scores
Source	Rating
Smash Hits	8/10

The Barbara Dickson Album is a 1980 album released by Scottish singer Barbara Dickson.

The album was released following her return to the top 20 with the single "January February". Produced by Alan Tarney, the album was a success, reaching No.7 in the UK Charts and remaining in the top 75 for three months. It was certified gold by the BPI for sales of over 100,000 in the UK. Further singles taken from the album were "In the Night" and "It's Really You".

The album was released on compact disc in 1992.

== Track listing ==
Side One

1. "January February" (Alan Tarney)
2. "In the Night" (Barbara Dickson)
3. "It's Really You" (Alan Tarney, Trevor Spencer, Tom Snow)
4. "Day and Night" (Barbara Dickson, Ian Lynn)
5. "Can't Get By Without You" (Alan Tarney)

Side Two

1. "Anytime You're Down and Out" (Barbara Dickson)
2. "I'll Say it Again" (Alan Tarney)
3. "Hello Stranger, Goodbye My Heart" (Barbara Dickson)
4. "Plane Song" (Barbara Dickson)
5. "Now I Don't Know" (Alan Tarney)

== Personnel ==
- Alan Tarney - bass, guitars, keyboards, vocals
- Trevor Spencer - drums, percussion
- Mel Collins - saxophone
- Recorded at R.G Jones Studios and Riverside Studios, London
- Nick Sykes, Nick Glennie-Smith - engineer
