= Echoes (magazine) =

British music magazine

- Echoes July 2014
- Categories: Music
- Frequency: Monthly
- First issue: 30 January 1976
- Country: United Kingdom
- Language: English

Echoes (originally Black Echoes) is a monthly magazine of soul, jazz, R&B, hip hop and reggae. It was founded as a weekly newspaper, Black Echoes, in 1976 and later changed its name to just Echoes. It became a monthly magazine in 2000.

== History ==
=== Early years ===
Black Echoes, 27 August 1983.

The first issue of Black Echoes (as it was originally named) was published on 30 January 1976. It was a weekly 24-page tabloid newspaper covering several genres of black music – at the time mostly soul, funk, reggae, northern soul and some blues. It took in the rise of hip-hop and R&B during the 1980s, and added jazz to its repertoire.

Publishers were John Thompson, former boss of IPC (where he was publisher of Melody Maker, Sounds, Disc and Music Echo – later to become Record Mirror/Disc and then Record Mirror), and Alan Walsh, co-founder of Sounds and former jazz journalist with Melody Maker.

Black Echoes was the only weekly read for black music fans across the genres.

The paper's first editor was Peter Harvey, with Alan Walsh as Editor-in-Chief.

=== 21st century ===
With colour playing an ever more important part in the printing process of newspapers and magazines, Echoes (as it was renamed in 1981) metamorphosed into a four-colour, glossy magazine in January 2000.

== Editors ==
- Peter Harvey (1976–1978)
- Chris Gill (1978–1983)
- Debbie Kirby (1983–1994)
- Chris Wells (1994–present)

== Contributors ==
Contributors past and present include:

Chris Wells – current Editor. Joined as staff soul writer in 1984; appointed Deputy Editor the same year; became Editor in 1994. Continues to specialize in soul, both new and old.

Kevin Le Gendre – current Deputy Editor; broadcaster and writer on jazz.

John Masouri - writes about reggae, author of several books and speaker.

Mike Atherton - writer on '60s/'70s soul, reggae and blues, and contributor to Blues Unlimited and Record Collector.

Steve Barrow – historiographer specialising in reggae.

Paul Phillips – Black Echoes' advertising manager wrote reports as 'The Rambler'.

Paul Mooney – contributor and Deep Echoes columnist since 1976, now a music publisher and record company owner

Sunil Chauhan – hip-hop writer.

Andrew Lubega [Mr. Drew] – former staff writer, now regular R&B columnist and feature writer.

Adam Mattera – former staff writer, former Editor of Attitude magazine, now regular contributor.

Laurence Prangell – columnist and co-owner of London's Soul Brother Records.

Dan Dodds [Soul Jones] – soul, funk & slop features writer, regular contributor.

Stuart Cosgrove – writer and former head of Channel 4 programming.

David Rodigan MBE – reggae broadcaster and DJ.

Ian McCann – James Brown expert, national newspaper columnist, Viz contributor and Editor of Record Collector.

Stephanie Calman – author, columnist and TV sitcom writer.

Lindsay Wesker – former journalist, former A&R man, now author, broadcaster and playwright.

Jonathan Futrell – former Deputy Editor television and radio broadcaster travel and style writer author and music publicist..

Neil Rushton – formerly Black Echoes' Deputy Editor, now record label owner, DJ and author.

Clive Richardson – broadcaster and DJ.

Cliff White - leading soul authority and writer and specialist on the career of James Brown.

Tony Monson – broadcaster and writer.

Richard Norris - former leader of '80s band The Grid.

Peter Simonds [aka Penny Reel] – reggae journalist and author.

Dom Servini - regular columnist and founder of Wah Wah Records

David Toop – author and music writer.

Peter Mason – journalist and author.

Garry Mulholland – journalist and author.

Simon Buckland – reggae writer and photographer.

Ian Moody – former Fleet Street journalist, club DJ, now black cab driver.

David Corio – photographer.

Tim Barrow - photographer.

Adam Scott - photographer.

Anna Arnone – photographer and writer.

Eugene Maynard – photographer.

T-Max - photographer

Pete Johnson – reggae writer.

Julien Scanlon - writer(1988-1989)

== See also ==
- Black Echoes – an Irish radio show.
- Black Music
