= From the Beggar's Mantle...Fringed with Gold =

From the Beggars Mantle...Fringed with Gold

Studio album by Barbara Dickson
- Released: 1972
- Recorded: 1971
- Studio: Decca, London
- Genre: Pop, MOR
- Length: 33:15
- Label: Decca
- Producer: Ray Horricks

Barbara Dickson chronology
Do Right Woman (1970)	From the Beggars Mantle...Fringed with Gold (1972)	Answer Me (1976)

From the Beggar's Mantle ... Fringed with Gold is an album by Barbara Dickson.

"The Morning Lies Heavy on Me" by Allan Taylor is a soldier's farewell to his family. Dickson had met the folk singer Daisy Chapman (1912 - 1979) in 1968, and had learned "The Orange and the Blue" directly from her. It is a longer version of the song "All Around My Hat". "Lord Thomas of Winesberry and the King's Daughter" is sustained for 6 minutes with simple fiddle and guitar accompaniment. The album was recorded in 1971 and released on vinyl in 1972. It was re-released in 2006 on CD with Do Right Woman.

== Track listing ==
Side One

1. "Witch of the Westmorland" (Archie Fisher) (4:08)
2. "If I Never, Ever Saw You Again" (Archie Fisher) (3:03)
3. "Recruited Collier" (Traditional) (2:35)
4. "The Morning Lies Heavy On Me" (Allan Taylor) (3:10)
5. "Fine Flowers in the Valley" (Traditional) (3:01)

Side Two

1. "Lord Thomas of Winesberry and the King's Daughter" (Traditional; arranged by Archie Fisher) (6:02)
2. "The Climb" (Archie Fisher) (3:16)
3. "The Orange and the Blue" (Traditional) (3:38)
4. "Winter's Song" (Alan Hull) (4:32)

== Personnel ==
- Barbara Dickson - vocals
- Nic Jones - fiddle, guitar
- Archie Fisher - guitar, concertina
- Daryl Runswick - bass, piano
- Bill DeMont - cello

Technical

- Derek Varnals - engineer
