= 2008 Jade Solid Gold Awards =

Hong Kong music awards ceremony

The 2008 Jade Solid Gold Best Ten Music Awards Presentation (Chinese: 2008年度十大勁歌金曲頒獎典禮) was held on January 3, 2009, at the Kowloon Hong Kong International Trade and Exhibition Centre. It is part of the Jade Solid Gold Best Ten Music Awards Presentation series.

== Top 10 song awards ==
The top 10 songs (十大勁歌金曲) of 2008 are as follows.

Song name in Chinese	Artist
跑步機上	Joey Yung
囍帖街	Kay Tse
撈月亮的人	Miriam Yeung
龐貝‧21世紀	Jade Kwan
歌‧頌	Eason Chan
愛不疚	Raymond Lam
韻律泳	Denise Ho
他的故事	Hins Cheung
眼睛不能沒眼淚	Leo Ku
她慈我悲	Hacken Lee

== Additional awards ==
Award	Song (if available for award)	Recipient
The most popular group (最受歡迎組合獎)	-	(gold) Fama
-	-	(silver) HotCha
-	-	(bronze) Mr.
The most popular new male artist (最受歡迎新人獎) (男)	-	(gold) William Chan
-	-	(silver) Bosco Wong
-	-	(bronze) Det Dik (狄易達)
The most popular new female artist (最受歡迎新人獎) (女)	Where Did You Go	(gold) G.E.M
-	-	(silver) Linda Chung
-	-	(bronze) Fiona Fung
New field award (新人薦場飆星獎)	-	Myolie Wu
Performance award (度傑出表現獎)	-	Susanna Kwan
-	-	(silver) Juno Mak
-	-	(bronze) Jason Chan
New field award (新人薦場飆星獎)	-	Myolie Wu
The most popular commercial song (最受歡迎廣告歌曲大獎)	Lucky Star	(gold) Joey Yung
-	I Miss You	(silver) Jason Chan
-	You are my best friend	(bronze) HotCha
The most popular Chinese song (最受歡迎華語歌曲獎)	心裏話	(gold) Sun Nan
-	小酒窩	(silver) JJ Lin, Charlene Choi
-	Love song	(bronze) Khalil Fong
The most popular group song (最受歡迎合唱歌曲獎)	一事無成	(gold) Pakho Chau, Stephanie Cheng
-	逼得寵物太緊	(silver) Terence Siufay, Kary Ng
-	最難過今天	(bronze) Myolie Wu, Vincent Wong
The most popular cover song award (最受歡迎改編歌曲獎)	渴求	(gold) Emme Wong
-	只要和你在一起	(silver) Eric Suen (孫耀威)
-	千嬌百媚	(bronze) Colleen Lau
Most popular singer-songwriter (最受歡迎唱作歌星)	-	(gold) Ivana Wong
-	-	(silver) Justin Lo
-	-	(bronze) Patrick Tang
Outstanding performance award (傑出表現獎)	-	(gold) Hins Cheung
-	-	(silver) Jade Kwan
-	-	(bronze) Patrick Tang
The best compositions (最佳作曲)	囍帖街	Eric Kwok
The best lyrics (最佳填詞)	囍帖街	Wyman Wong
The best music arrangement (最佳編曲)	跑步機上	Carl Wong (王雙駿)
The best song producer (最佳歌曲監製)	寫得太多	Peter Kam
Four channel award (四台聯頒音樂大獎)	Binary	Kay Tse
Asian Pacific most popular Hong Kong male artist (亞太區最受歡迎香港男歌星獎)	然後怎樣	Eason Chan
Asian Pacific most popular Hong Kong female artist (亞太區最受歡迎香港女歌星獎)	夢非夢	Joey Yung
The most popular male artist (最受歡迎男歌星)	年年有今日	Leo Ku
The most popular female artist (最受歡迎女歌星)	明日再會	Miriam Yeung
Gold song gold award (金曲金獎)	囍帖街	Kay Tse
