= Friends Forever =

Friends Forever may refer to:

== Books ==
- Friends Forever (novel), a 2012 novel by Danielle Steel
- Friends Forever, a book adapted from the comics series W.I.T.C.H.

== Film and television ==
- Friends Forever (1987 film) or Venner for altid, a Danish film
- Dosti: Friends Forever, a 2005 Indian film
- Friends Forever (2007 film), an Indian animated feature film of 2007
- Friends Forever (TV series), a 2010 Malaysian Chinese drama
- "Friends Forever" (Adventure Time), a television episode
- "Friends Forever" (LazyTown), a television episode

== Music ==
- Friends Forever (Sharon, Lois & Bram album), 1998
- "Friends Forever" (song), a song by Thunderbugs, 1999
- "Graduation (Friends Forever)", a song by Vitamin C, 2000
- Friends Forever, an album by the cast of the TV series The Saddle Club, 2003
- Friends Forever, an album from the TV series Tweenies
- "Friends Forever", a song from the TV series Saved by the Bell
- "Friends Forever", a song from the TV series Bear in the Big Blue House
- Friends Forever, a band signed to Load Records

== See also ==
- Forever Friends (disambiguation)
