= Baby Please Don't Stop =

2019 single by Emma Bunton

Single by Emma Bunton

from the album My Happy Place
- Released: 27 February 2019
- Recorded: 2018
- Genre: Pop
- Length: 3:00
- Label: BMG
- Songwriters: Emma Bunton; Patrick Mascall; Paul Barry
- Producers: Paul Meehan; Brian Rawling

Emma Bunton singles chronology
"I Know Him So Well" (2012)	"Baby Please Don't Stop" (2019)	"Too Many Teardrops" (2019)

Music video
- "Baby Please Don't Stop" on YouTube

"Baby Please Don't Stop" (2019) is a song by Spice Girls member Emma Bunton, released on 27 February 2019 as the lead single from her fourth studio album, My Happy Place. It is Bunton's first solo single released in twelve years, the last being "All I Need to Know" in 2007. The single was written by Bunton, Patrick Mascall, and Paul Barry, while Paul Meehan and Brian Rawling handled the song's production.

== Composition ==
"Baby Please Don't Stop" is a 1960s-inspired pop song with a length of three minutes. Musically, it contains sensual vocals over sugary production, with a tambourine-led chorus while the bridge stripping production down to the singer's voice and the bass guitar.

== Critical reception ==
Official Charts gave the song a positive review, saying "This is a flirty, carefree and confident Emma who is taking control of the situation with the man of her dreams." Attitude called the song "another slice of the smooth '60s-styled radio pop that came to define Emma's solo sound in the early to mid-noughties". Mike Nied of Idolator called the song "infectious and with plenty of replay factor".

== Live performances ==
Bunton performed the song on BBC The One Show.

== Music videos ==
Two music videos have been produced for the single. The official music video premiered on 27 February 2019. It features the singer on the set of a photoshoot with her family and dog, while trying on outfits and drinking champagne. Almost a month later, on 21 March 2019, a second music video has been uploaded and released to the singers' channel. Though sublabelled as the vertical video, it is not a vertical version of the official video produced for mobile devices and other social media. Instead it's an original different video with all new shots. In this video the singer is standing in front of a blue colored brick wall, dressed in a jeans jacket, smiling, dancing and singing along to the song.

== Personnel ==
Adapted from Tidal.

- Emma Bunton – lead artist, songwriter
- Paul Barry – songwriter, guitar
- Patrick Mascall – songwriter
- Paul Meehan – producer, keyboards, programmer
- Brian Rawling – producer
- Hayley Sanderson – backing vocals
- Adam Phillips – guitar
- Jade Jones – vocal arranger
- Ash Howes – engineer
- Dick Beetham – engineer
- Matt Furmidge – engineer
