= John, Paul, George, Ringo ... and Bert =

1974 musical by Willy Russell

- Written by: Willy Russell
- Characters: The Beatles (John Lennon, Paul McCartney, George Harrison, Ringo Starr), Bert McGhee
- Original language: English
- Subject: The Beatles
- Genre: musical, biography

Premiere
- Date premiered: May 1974
- Place premiered: Everyman Theatre, Liverpool, England
- Official website

John, Paul, George, Ringo ... and Bert is a 1974 musical by Willy Russell based on the story of the Beatles.

It premiered at the Everyman Theatre in Liverpool in May 1974, where it ran for eight weeks, and later moved to the Lyric Theatre in London in August 1974, where it ran for a year and was later named "Best Musical of 1974" by the Evening Standard Theatre Awards and London Critics' awards. It featured the music of the Beatles performed by Barbara Dickson.

It also briefly ran in Ireland in 1977 and in the United States in 1985.

== Creative team ==
- Directed by Alan Dossor
- Design: Graham Barkmerth
- Lighting: Mick Hughes
- Sound: David Collison
- Movement Consultant: Rufus Collins

=== Original London cast ===
- Bert: George Costigan
- John Lennon: Bernard Hill
- Paul McCartney: Trevor Eve
- George Harrison: Phillip Joseph
- Ringo Starr: Anthony Sher
- Brian Epstein, First Beatles Manager: Robin Hooper
- Porter - Hitler - party guest - phone man...: Nick Stringer
- Teddy Boy: Barry Woolgar
- Teddy Boy: Dick Haydon
- Teddy Boy: Ian Jentle
- Tiny Tina: Luan Peters
- Titular 1: Linda Beckett
- Titular 2: Elizabeth Estensen
- Titular 3 - TV reporter: Valerie Lilley
- Singer and pianist: Barbara Dickson
- Musicians: Robert Ash, Terry Canning

== Album ==
An Original Cast Recording album was released by RSO Records.

=== Side One ===
- "I Should Have Known Better" (Barbara Dickson)
- "Your Mother Should Know" (Barbara Dickson)
- "Ooee Boppa" (Tiny Tina & The Titular 3)
- "With a Little Help from My Friends" (Barbara Dickson)
- "Penny Lane" (Barbara Dickson)
- "In the Bleak Midwinter" (Barbara Dickson)
- "Here Comes The Sun" (Barbara Dickson)
- "Long and Winding Road" (Barbara Dickson)

=== Side Two ===
- "Clap and Cheer" (The Cast)
- "Help" (Barbara Dickson)
- "Lucy in the Sky" (Barbara Dickson)
- "You Never Give Me Your Money"/"Carry That Weight" (Barbara Dickson)
- "We Can Work It Out" (Barbara Dickson)
- "I Will Be Your Love" (Leroy Lover - Bert)
- "A Day in the Life" (Barbara Dickson)

=== Credits ===
Produced by Ian Samwell

- Keyboards and vocals: Barbara Dickson
- Fender bass guitar: Pete Zorn
- Drums and percussion: Dave Mattacks (courtesy of Island Records)
- Guitar: Kevin Peek
- Additional vocals: Gerry Rafferty and Joe Egan (courtesy of A&M Records)
- Horns and woodwinds arranged by Jimmy Horowitz and Ian Samwell
- Engineer: Dennis Weinreich

== Reaction ==
According to an interview with Creem magazine, George Harrison stated that he saw the play with Derek Taylor and greatly disliked it. He walked out while attending the London premiere and withdrew permission to use his song "Here Comes the Sun". It was replaced with "Good Day Sunshine".

After excerpts from the play were broadcast on BBC television, Paul McCartney criticised it for being biased against him and in favour of John Lennon, objecting in particular to the suggestion that it was McCartney and not Lennon who was responsible for the break-up of the Beatles. McCartney blocked a proposed film version of the musical.
