= Full Circle (Barbara Dickson album) =

Studio album by Barbara Dickson
- Released: 20 September 2004
- Recorded: 2004
- Genre: Folk, pop, MOR
- Length: 47:43
- Label: R and M Records
- Producer: Troy Donockley

Barbara Dickson chronology
For the Record (2002)	Full Circle (2004)	Nothing's Gonna Change My World (2006)

Full Circle is an album by Barbara Dickson, released in 2004. As the title suggests, the album saw Dickson returning to her first love - folk music. It also marked the beginning of her musical partnership with Troy Donockley who arranged and produced the album. The album was critically well-received - The Daily Telegraph wrote:

Sifting through one of her father's old shirt boxes, where she habitually stored bits of paper with the words of songs she picked up while touring the folk clubs of the British Isles as a young woman, Barbara Dickson found the material for this return to her pre-Blood Brothers, pre-Band of Gold roots.

It is no exaggeration to describe Dickson as a great singer. She stood out a mile among the Scottish folk singers of her generation, and she has consistently shown her class when performing for a wider public.

From the first notes of 'Garton Mother's Lullaby' to the last strains of 'Eriskay Love Song', Full Circle maintains those fine standards. Dickson takes each ballad in her stride, ably produced by Troy Donockley, who also contributes moody uillean pipes. The content is predominantly traditional, though the Everly Brothers' 'Living Too Close To The Ground' is a surprising exception, and it is easy to see why these songs, melodically strong and lyrically rich, caught Dickson's attention years ago. Without dismissing the work she has done in the other three decades of her career, this is Dickson at her most engaging.

== Track listing ==
No.	Title	Music	Length
1.	"Garten Mother's Lullaby"	Traditional	3:37
2.	"The Sky Above the Roof"	Ralph Vaughan Williams	2:21
3.	"Across the Hills"	Leon Rosselson	3:08
4.	"The Unquiet Grave"	Traditional	5:26
5.	"Faithless Love"	JD Souther	5:26
6.	"Westron Wynde"	Traditional	0:34
7.	"Corpus Christi Carol"	Traditional	4:42
8.	"Living Too Close to the Ground"	The Everly Brothers	4:41
9.	"Singing Bird"	Traditional	6:31
10.	"When I Am Laid to Earth (Dido's Lament)"	Henry Purcell	4:00
11.	"Eriskay Love Song"	Traditional	7:14

== Personnel ==
- Barbara Dickson - vocals
- Neil Drinkwater - grand piano
- Danny Thompson - double bass
- Troy Donockley - guitars, uilleann pipes, low and tin whistles, mandola, harmonium
- Terl Bryant - drums, percussion
- The Emperor String Quartet (Martin Burgess - violin, Clare Hayes - violin, Fiona Bonds - viola, William Schofield - cello)
