= John Masouri =

British music journalist (born 1953)

- Born: April 5, 1953 (age 73); Nottingham, England
- Occupations: Music journalist, historian, reviewer
- Years active: 1980s-present
- Known for: Author reggae music
- Notable work: Wailing Blues: The Story of Bob Marley's Wailers (2008) Steppin' Razor: The Life of Peter Tosh (2013)
- Website: johnmasouri.com

John Masouri is a journalist, author, reviewer and historian for Jamaican music and several of its musical offshoots including dub, roots and dancehall. He is one of the world's foremost reggae music journalist and has worked extensively over it.

== Early life and career ==
He was born in 1953 in Nottingham, England to a working-class family. Between 1964 and 1969 he attended Carlton-Le-Willows Grammar School. His love of music flourished during this period and would encompass rock, blues, soul, folk and Blue Beat, which he discovered during visits to illicit house parties known as "blues" or "shubeens", in an area of Nottingham called the Meadows.

After an early career in art, he began DJing reggae music in Brighton clubs and house parties in the early eighties. This led to him becoming a presenter – again playing reggae music – on Radio Falmer, local pirate station Faze FM and community station Festival Radio, where his fellow presenters included Norman Cook and Carl Cox.

== Journalism ==
His work as a music journalist specialising in all forms of reggae, from ska to bashment began in 1988 when he started writing for Echoes, a UK weekly black music newspaper formerly known as Black Echoes. In 2000 this publication became a monthly magazine, still called Echoes, for which he continues to write full-length features, singles and album reviews on the genre's artists and producers. For the first eight years he worked in tandem with portrait photographer Tim Barrow on location in the UK and Jamaica. John Masouri's extensive list of interviewees from the past thirty years include Jimmy Cliff, Bunny Wailer, Gregory Isaacs, Toots and the Maytals, UB40, Burning Spear, Lee "Scratch" Perry, Sean Paul, Shaggy, Maxi Priest, Damian Marley, Stephen Marley, Chronixx, Vybz Kartel, Garnet Silk, Sizzla, Shabba Ranks, Super Cat, Bounty Killer, Capleton, Prince Buster, Augustus Pablo, Alton Ellis and Beres Hammond, among many others.

In 2011 he appeared as a talking head in the film The Story of Lovers Rock directed by Menelik Shabazz. Additionally he has contributed to several radio and television documentaries commissioned by the BBC (The Story Of Jamaican Music, Blood And Fire: Reggae And Rastafari and Arise Black Man: The Peter Tosh Story), Channel 4, and the BBC World Service. In 2015 he was commissioned by VP Records to conduct interviews with leading Reggae artists and producers for two DVDs released as part of their Reggae Anthology series. The first was Gussie Clarke: From The Foundation released in 2015. The second, Bobby Digital: Xtra Wicked was released in 2018. Both these compilations included his extensive liner notes. He has written album liner notes and promotional material for record companies including Virgin, EMI, Island Records, BMG, Sony, Greensleeves, Jet Star, VP Records, Xterminator, Sanctuary, Trojan, Island Jamaica, Charly Records, Maximum Sound and Cherry Red.

As a co-curator of the London Sound System Culture exhibition at the Tabernacle in Notting Hill, London during January 2016 he provided research and wrote all the accompanying text. Later that same month he was a guest speaker at the London Sound System Culture symposium held at Goldsmiths College, New Cross.

He has also been a guest speaker and panellist at events, including the Rototum Festival (in 2008, 2012 and 2017) and the Reggae Symposium of Film and Music held at Nottingham Broadway Arts Centre in 2015.

His articles on reggae have appeared in Mojo, Music Week, The Guardian and NME, as well as magazines in Japan (RM) and Germany (Style Magazine). He is a regular contributor to reggae publications in Germany (Riddim Magazine) and France (Reggae Vibes).

== Works ==
In 1994 he was a contributor to The Guinness Who's Who of Reggae and a follow-up volume, The Virgin Encyclopedia of Reggae (1998).

In 2008 he completed an authorised biography of Bob Marley and the Wailers called Wailing Blues: The Story of Bob Marley's Wailers for Omnibus Press.

Work on it began in 1998 when he was approached by Aston "Family Man" Barrett to write an authorised biography of The Wailers, telling of the band's history and their time spent touring and recording with Bob Marley. He accompanied Family Man and The Wailers on tour throughout Europe and the US over the following nine years. The resulting book was described by Marley authority Roger Steffens in US publication The Beat as 'a monumental achievement. Of the nearly two hundred Marley books out there, this may be the best ever, a fan's dream come true.' His next book, also for Omnibus Press, was the first ever biography of reggae star and former Wailer Peter Tosh called Steppin' Razor: The Life of Peter Tosh published in 2013. The trilogy was completed in 2015 with the publication of Simmer Down: The Early Wailers' Story which traces the history of the original vocal trio featuring Bob Marley, Peter Tosh and Bunny Wailer.

He has written the introduction to several books including the Japanese publication Jamaican Patois Dictionary by Yvonne Goldson 2014, the graphic novel Wake Up & Live! The Life of Bob Marley by Jim McCarthy & Benito Gallego (Omnibus Press 2017) and ECHO / Fuel For Fire by Jamaican poet Oku Onuora (Iroko Books 2018).

He has written introduction to former Jamaican Prime Minister Edward Seaga's CD box set Reggae Golden Jubilee 50th Anniversary. He was the named editor for Asher Senator's book Smiley And Me. He was the ghostwriter for Miss Pat's book Miss Pat - My Reggae Music Journey.

=== Publications ===
- Wailing Blues: The Story of Bob Marley's Wailers (2008), Omnibus Press, ISBN 978-1-84609-689-1
- Steppin' Razor: The Life of Peter Tosh (2013), Omnibus Press, ISBN 978-1-84772-836-4
- Simmer Down: The Early Wailers' Story (2015), Jook Joint Press, ISBN 978-0-9933759-0-3
- Rebel Frequency: Jamaica's Reggae Revival (2020), Jook Joint Press ISBN 978-0-9933759-9-6
- The Marley Files: One Foundation (Reggae Chronicles) (2020), Jook Joint Press ISBN 978-0-9933759-5-8

== Awards ==
In 2008 he was presented with an award for outstanding services to UK Reggae at a ceremony held at the Brixton O2, London, featuring the Lovers Rock artists Sugar Minott and Errol Dunkley.
