= Kevin Le Gendre =

British journalist, broadcaster and author

- Occupations: Journalist, broadcaster and author
- Notable work: Soul Unsung: Reflections On The Band In Black Popular Music (2012): Don't Stop the Carnival: Black British Music: Vol 1 from the Middle Ages to the 1960s (2018)
- Awards: Parliamentary Jazz Awards – "Jazz Journalist of the Year", 2009

Kevin Le Gendre is a British journalist, broadcaster and author whose work focuses on Black music. He is deputy editor of Echoes magazine, has written for a wide range of publications, including Jazzwise, MusicWeek, Vibrations, The Independent On Sunday and The Guardian, and is a contributor to such radio programmes as BBC Radio 3's J to Z and BBC Radio 4's Front Row. At the 2009 Parliamentary Jazz Awards Le Gendre was chosen as "Jazz Journalist of the Year".

== Background and career ==
Le Gendre was born to parents who migrated to Britain from Trinidad, where he lived as a child. He is now resident in Seven Sisters, north London.

Although he did not study music formally, Le Gendre has said: "I have been listening to music all of my life having been exposed to it from a young age by my parents. They ... played soca and calypso until they wore the record out, as well as soul and jazz. I was one of those kids who listened to records over and over again."

In 1997, he began writing for Echoes (which was originally called Black Echoes) and is now the magazine's deputy editor. Among other publications to which he has contributed are Jazzwise, Vibrations, Music Week, The Jazz Mann, The Independent, The Times Literary Supplement and The Guardian. As a reviewer, interviewer and broadcaster, Le Gendre appears regularly on BBC Radio (for example, Radio 3's J to Z), as well as at festivals and other events.

In 2018, he joined the teaching staff of Trinity Laban Conservatoire of Music and Dance.

== Books ==
Le Gendre is the author of two well received books on the history of Black music: Soul Unsung: Reflections On The Band In Black Popular Music (2012) and Don't Stop the Carnival: Black British Music: Vol 1 from the Middle Ages to the 1960s (2018).

=== Soul Unsung: Reflections On The Band In Black Popular Music (2012) ===
Soul Unsung was described in Record Collector as a "thought-provoking and endlessly informative book by a writer who knows his subject inside-out and, just as importantly, clearly adores it." Black Grooves magazine said that Le Gendre's book "is superbly written, extremely insightful, and will be of interest to scholars, musicians, and anyone else seeking a deeper understanding of developments in the soul canon from the 1960s to present, especially the complex interplay between singers and musicians.

=== Don't Stop the Carnival: Black British Music (2018) ===
Diana Evans described Don't Stop the Carnival in the Financial Times as "a meticulously researched, compassionate and sweeping opus of the history of black British music. It is also an extensive political, sociological and philosophical study of the story of racism that is hugely pertinent to our time." Writing about the genesis and scope of the book, Le Gendre has stated: "An overarching theme gradually emerged: the presence of black musicians in the military. This is really the backbone of Don’t Stop The Carnival. Drummers, brass players, reed players, string players and singers of African descent dot the history of the British armed services, as well as American units, some of which were posted in the UK. ... Learning more about their lives took on a more personal resonance because my own father, Conrad Zeno Le Gendre, is a West Indian ex-serviceman. I came to realize that I was writing Don’t Stop The Carnival for him as much as I was for the countless musicians who feature in the text. It is the greatest privilege I could have wished for."

In a review for TLS, Lloyd Bradley described Le Gendre as "one of the UK's leading black music experts", going on to say: "As a reference book it is factually exhaustive, while his descriptions of and explanations for pieces of music or uses of instruments add valuable layers. In a work such as this the waterfall of facts and information could easily become overwhelming, so these explorations of sounds and tunes provide welcome relief and stop it turning into a sort of required reading textbook. They give the music a personality, too, making it dangerously desirable – indeed that probably sums up Don’t Stop the Carnival: it'll make you want to go out and buy more records than is perhaps wise."

At the ARSC Awards for Excellence Don't Stop the Carnival was the winner in the category "Best Historical Research in Recorded Roots and World Music".

== Awards ==
- 2009: Parliamentary Jazz Awards – "Jazz Journalist of the Year".
- 2019: Best Historical Research in Recorded Roots or World Music at the ARSC Awards for Excellence for Don't Stop the Carnival: Black Music in Britain.

== Selected bibliography ==
- Soul Unsung: Reflections On The Band In Black Popular Music, Equinox Publishing, 2012. ISBN 978-1845535438.
- Don't Stop the Carnival: Black British Music: Vol 1 from the Middle Ages to the 1960s, Peepal Tree Press, 2018. ISBN 978-1845233617.
- Hear My Train A Comin': The Songs of Jimi Hendrix, Equinox Publishing, 2020. ISBN 978-1800500136.
