= Do Right Woman =

Studio album by Barbara Dickson
- Released: 1970
- Genre: Folk, MOR
- Length: 34:47
- Label: Decca
- Producer: Ray Horricks

Barbara Dickson chronology
Do Right Woman (1970)	From the Beggar's Mantle...Fringed with Gold (1972)

Do Right Woman is the debut solo album by Barbara Dickson.

Barbara Dickson's first two solo albums were on Decca Records. They won critical praise but sold poorly. They show the repertoire that she had at that time as a singer in folk clubs. In 1973 her career took a different course when accepted an offer to sing on the London West End stage where she sang torch songs and power ballads. Do Right Woman was obviously recorded on a low budget. The first track, "Easy to be Hard" is from the musical Hair, almost a premonition of her future career on stage. In 1969 Barbara had been a backing singer on a recording by Rab Noakes. On Do Right Woman she returns the favour by singing one of his songs, "Turn a Deaf Ear". The first traditional song on the album is "The Garton Mother's Lullaby", which was re-recorded in 2005 on Full Circle. On "Returning" she sings the last verse in French. The album is named after her cover of "Do Right Woman, Do Right Man", originally recorded by Aretha Franklin.

The album was re-released in 2006 on CD with her next album, From the Beggar's Mantle...Fringed with Gold.

== Track listing ==
Side One

1. "Easy to Be Hard" (from Hair) (Gerome Ragni, James Rado, Galt MacDermot) – 2:52
2. "Turn A Deaf Ear" (Rab Noakes) – 4:18
3. "Something's Wrong" (Allan Taylor) – 2:52
4. "The Garton Mother's Lullaby" (Traditional) – 2:23
5. "Dainty Davie" (Traditional) – 2:00
6. "Returning" (Archie Fisher) – 3:33

Side Two

1. "Do Right Woman" (Chips Moman, Dan Penn) – 2:52
2. "The Long and Lonely Winter" (Dave Goulder) – 2:38
3. "A Lover's Ghost" (Traditional) – 3:21
4. "The Blacksmith" (Traditional) – 1:46
5. "Gloomy Sunday" (Rezső Seress, László Jávor, Sam M. Lewis, Carter) – 2:05
6. "And I Will Sing" (Archie Fisher) – 4:07

== Personnel ==
- Barbara Dickson - vocals
- Archie Fisher - backing vocals, guitars, dulcimer, concertina
- Rab Noakes - backing vocals, guitar
- Ronnie Rae - bass
- Bill Kemp - drums
- String sextet arranged and conducted by Alex Sutherland
- Produced by Ray Horricks
