= I Know Him So Well =

Duet from the album/musical Chess

Single by Elaine Paige and Barbara Dickson

from the album Chess, Gold and Love Hurts
- B-side: "Chess" (London Symphony Orchestra)
- Released: December 1984
- Recorded: 1984
- Genre: Pop
- Length: 4:15
- Label: RCA
- Songwriters: Benny Andersson; Tim Rice; Björn Ulvaeus
- Producers: Björn Ulvaeus; Benny Andersson; Tim Rice

Music video
- "I Know Him So Well" on YouTube

"I Know Him So Well" is a duet from the concept album and subsequent musical Chess by Tim Rice, Benny Andersson and Björn Ulvaeus. It was originally sung by Elaine Paige (as Florence) and Barbara Dickson (as Svetlana). In this duet, two women – Svetlana, the Russian chess champion's estranged wife, and Florence, his mistress – express their bittersweet feelings for him and at seeing their relationships fall apart.

== History ==
The chorus of the song is based on the chorus of "I Am an A", a song performed live during Andersson and Ulvaeus' group ABBA's 1977 tour. Although "I Am an A" was never released officially, it circulated on various bootlegs.

== Original version ==
The duet was first released worldwide on the Chess double LP, often referred to as a concept album or album musical, in the autumn of 1984. Later it was released as a single by Paige and Dickson, the duet reaching number one in the UK Singles Chart for four weeks in 1985. They laid down their vocals separately and never met during the recording of the song, only for the video and subsequent performances on Top of the Pops and the European tours. This recording remains in the Guinness Book of Records as the biggest selling UK chart single ever by a female duo. Paige also appeared in the original London West End stage production of Chess. The song peaked at number 21 in Australia.

In the United Kingdom on 18 September 2004, the BBC's All-Time Greatest Love Songs (hosted by Lionel Richie) saw the duet performed live by Paige and Dickson, together for the first time in 20 years, to a rapturous reception. Paige played her solo demo recording of the song on her BBC Radio 2 show, Elaine Paige on Sunday.

In January 2011, the Official Charts Company released a list of the top 10 All Time Best Selling Duets in which "I Know Him So Well" was placed seventh in the chart.

Paige and Dickson also recorded a Spanish-language version of the song called "Lo Creo Conocer". It was never officially released.

== Charts ==
=== Weekly charts ===
Chart (1985)	Peak position
Australia (Kent Music Report)	21
Ireland (IRMA)	1
New Zealand (Recorded Music NZ)	9
UK Singles (OCC)	1

=== Year-end charts ===
Chart (1985)	Position
Australia (Kent Music Report)	88
UK Singles (OCC)	2

=== Original recording credits ===
- Benny Andersson – keyboards, synthesizers
- Barbara Dickson – vocals
- Anders Eljas – keyboards, synthesizers
- Rutger Gunnarsson – bass
- Per Lindvall – drums, percussion
- Elaine Paige – vocals
- Lasse Wellander – guitars
- Writers and producers – Benny Andersson, Tim Rice, Björn Ulvaeus
- Arrangement – Benny Andersson, Anders Eljas
- Engineer and mixer – Michael B. Tretow

== Cissy Houston and Whitney Houston version ==
"I Know Him So Well"

Single by Cissy Houston and Whitney Houston

from the album Whitney
- B-side: "Just the Lonely Talking Again"; "You're Still My Man"
- Released: 30 November 1988
- Recorded: 1986–1987
- Genre: Soul; gospel; R&B
- Length: 4:30
- Label: Arista
- Songwriters: Tim Rice; Björn Ulvaeus; Benny Andersson
- Producer: Narada Michael Walden

Whitney Houston singles chronology
"One Moment in Time" (1988)	"I Know Him So Well" (1988)	"It Isn't, It Wasn't, It Ain't Never Gonna Be" (1989)

Licensed audio
- "I Know Him So Well" on YouTube

In 1987, a studio version of "I Know Him So Well" was recorded as a duet by Cissy Houston and her daughter Whitney Houston for Whitney's second album, Whitney. It was released as the 6th and final single from Whitney on 30 November 1988 in Australia, Germany, Netherlands, and Spain. There was no official music video produced for the Houston duet of song, however there are live performance video-recordings. The song version was included in the North American leg of Houston's Moment of Truth World Tour. The single was not promoted as heavily as previous singles from Whitney.

=== Critical reception ===
Robert Hilburn of the Los Angeles Times praised the duet, saying, "The album ends on a graceful, intimate note as Houston is joined by her mother, singer Cissy Houston, on 'I Know Him So Well', a ballad from the musical Chess." Rolling Stone's Vince Alleti criticized the song and production, saying, "Walden covers all these bases, out-schlocking Masser with 'I Know Him So Well'—a genuine if frankly derivative show tune (from Tim Rice's Chess) treated here with deadly reverence..." St. Petersburg Times called the duet lifting and praised the mother's role: "Mom adds a brief, welcome moment of grainy soulfulness to the album."

=== Chart performance ===
This single peaked at number 46 in Germany and in the Netherlands it peaked at number 16.

=== Formats and track listings ===
- Europe, CD maxi single
1. "I Know Him So Well" – 4:26
2. "Just the Lonely Talking Again" – 5:30
3. "You're Still My Man" – 4:15
- Europe, 7" vinyl

A: "I Know Him So Well" – 4:26
B: "Just the Lonely Talking Again" – 5:30

- German, 12" vinyl

A1: "I Know Him So Well" – 4:26
B1: "Just the Lonely Talking Again" – 5:30
B2: "You're Still My Man" – 4:15

=== Personnel ===
- Whitney Houston – vocals
- Cissy Houston – vocals
- Narada Michael Walden – acoustic drums
- Walter Afanasieff – Kurzweil, DX7, Super Jupiter
- Preston Glass – DX7
- Cory Lerios – synthesizer
- Randy Jackson – electric bass
- Corrado Rustici – guitar synth
- Michael Gibbs – string arrangements and conducting

=== Charts ===
Chart (1988)	Peak position
Belgium (Ultratop 50 Flanders)	19
Germany (GfK)	46
Netherlands (Dutch Top 40)	14
Netherlands (Single Top 100)	16

== Steps version ==
"I Know Him So Well"

Single by Steps

from the album The Last Dance
- A-side: "Words Are Not Enough"
- B-side: "Bittersweet"
- Released: 3 December 2001
- Studio: PWL (London, England)
- Length: 3:23
- Label: Jive; Ebul
- Songwriters: Benny Andersson; Björn Ulvaeus; Tim Rice
- Producers: Dan Frampton; Pete Waterman

Steps singles chronology
"Chain Reaction" (2001)	"Words Are Not Enough" / "I Know Him So Well" (2001)	"Light Up the World" (2012)

Music video
- "I Know Him So Well" on YouTube

British musical group Steps originally recorded "I Know Him So Well" for the 1999 Abbamania compilation, and the song later appeared on Steps' own The Last Dance collection. It was released as a double A-side with "Words Are Not Enough" in 2001 as the group's fifteenth single release, and the group's last single to be released before their Boxing Day split later the same month.

=== Chart performance ===
The single entered the charts at number five in the United Kingdom but quickly fell out of the top ten to number 14 the following week. It spent eleven weeks in total in the top 75 despite much lower sales than the group's previous singles. It also peaked at number 21 in Ireland.

=== Track listings ===
UK CD single

1. "Words Are Not Enough" – 3:24
2. "I Know Him So Well" – 4:14
3. "Bittersweet" – 3:58
4. "Words Are Not Enough" (video) – 3:24

UK cassette single

1. "Words Are Not Enough" – 3:24
2. "I Know Him So Well" – 4:14
3. "Bittersweet" – 3:58

=== Credits and personnel ===
Credits are adapted from the "Words Are Not Enough" / "I Know Him So Well" liner notes.

Recording

- Recorded at PWL Studios (London, England)
- Mixed at PWL Studios (London, England)
- Mastered at Transfermation (London, England)

Personnel

- Songwriting – Benny Andersson, Björn Ulvaeus, Tim Rice
- Production – Dan Frampton, Pete Waterman
- Mixing – Dan Frampton
- Engineering – Dan Frampton

=== Charts ===
Chart (2001–2002)	Peak position
Europe (Eurochart Hot 100)	27
Ireland (IRMA)	21
Romania (Romanian Top 100)	85
Scottish Singles Sales (Official Charts)	4
UK Singles (Official Charts)	5
UK Indie (Official Charts)	3

== Geraldine McQueen and Susan Boyle version ==
"I Know Him So Well"

Single by Geraldine McQueen (Peter Kay) and Susan Boyle
- Released: 21 March 2011
- Recorded: 2011
- Genre: Pop
- Songwriters: Tim Rice; Björn Ulvaeus; Benny Andersson

Peter Kay singles chronology
"The Official BBC Children in Need Medley" (2009)	"I Know Him So Well" (2011)

Susan Boyle singles chronology
"Perfect Day" (2010)	"I Know Him So Well" (2011)	"You Have to Be There" (2011)

Parody video
- "I Know Him So Well" on YouTube

"I Know Him So Well" was recorded by Peter Kay and Susan Boyle for Comic Relief 2011, with Kay appearing as his alter ego Geraldine McQueen. Their version reached number 11 on the UK Singles Chart. A parody music video was also created.

== Melanie C version ==
"I Know Him So Well"

Single by Melanie C featuring Emma Bunton

from the album Stages
- B-side: "You'll Never Walk Alone"
- Released: 11 November 2012
- Recorded: Spring 2012
- Genre: Pop rock
- Length: 4:24 (album version); 3:27 (radio edit)
- Label: Red Girl
- Songwriters: Benny Andersson; Tim Rice; Björn Ulvaeus
- Producer: Peter-John Vettese

Melanie C singles chronology
"Let There Be Love" (2011)	"I Know Him So Well" (2012)	"Loving You" (2013)

Emma Bunton singles chronology
"All I Need to Know" (2007)	"I Know Him So Well" (2012)	"Baby Please Don't Stop" (2019)

Live video
- "I Know Him So Well" on YouTube

"I Know Him So Well" was also covered by English recording artist Melanie C. The song was the first single to be taken from Melanie C's musical theatre-inspired and sixth studio album Stages. The song is a duet with Melanie C's fellow Spice Girls group member Emma Bunton. The song was released as a single on 11 November 2012. The b-side of the single is a cover of "You'll Never Walk Alone" from the musical Carousel. The music video for the song premiered on YouTube on 12 November 2012.

=== Formats and track listings ===
These are the formats and track listings of major single releases of "I Know Him So Well".

- Digital download
1. "I Know Him So Well"
2. "You'll Never Walk Alone"
- Limited CD single
1. "I Know Him So Well"
2. "You'll Never Walk Alone"
- Digital download
1. "I Know Him So Well" (radio edit)

=== Live performances ===
Melanie C and Bunton performed the song on

- This Morning
- BBC Children in Need
- Live at Shepherd's Bush Empire
- The Alan Titchmarsh Show
- Loose Women

=== Charts ===
Chart (2012)	Peak position
UK Singles (OCC)	153
UK Indie (OCC)	14

=== Release history ===
Country	Date	Format
Worldwide	11 November 2012	Digital download, CD single

== Other versions ==
The song has been covered in non-charting versions by several notable performers.

- Pianist Richard Clayderman included an instrumental version on his 1987 album, Songs of Love.
- Singers John Barrowman and Daniel Boys covered the song on Barrowman's 2008 album Music Music Music.
- In 2014, Charlotte Jaconelli and Kerry Ellis performed the song on Jaconelli's solo debut album, Solitaire.
- Sheridan Smith sang the song with Amanda Holden on Holden's 2020 debut album Songs from My Heart.
- In 2022, YouTuber singer–songwriter AJ Rafael released a single version along with filmmaker and singer Chance Calloway to raise funds for The Trevor Project.
