= Steven D. Stark =

American author and educator

- Born: November 21, 1951 (age 74)
- Education: Harvard College, Yale Law School
- Occupations: Author, cultural commentator, educator
- Writing career
- Genres: Popular culture, U.S. law
- Notable work: Writing to Win: The Legal Writer
- Website: starkwriting.com, artofstark.com

Steven D. Stark (born November 21, 1951) is an American author and educator, specializing in the areas of cultural commentary and U.S. law. He has worked as the cultural commentator for CNN, National Public Radio (NPR), and Voice of America, and written regularly for publications such as The New York Times, the Los Angeles Times, and The Atlantic. He has also contributed to The World, a radio program co-produced by the BBC World Service and WGBH.

Stark is the author of four books, including Glued to the Set: The 60 Television Shows and Events That Made Us Who We Are Today (1997), Writing to Win: The Legal Writer (1999), and Meet the Beatles: A Cultural History of the Band That Shook Youth, Gender, and the World (2005).

== Early life and career ==
Stark grew up in Washington, D.C. and attended Sidwell Friends School. His father, William, was a psychiatrist, and his mother, Vivianne, was a professor of English at Montgomery College. He graduated from Harvard College and Yale Law School. By 1979, he was employed as a law clerk to Judge Elbert P. Tuttle of the United States Court of Appeals for the Fifth Circuit in Atlanta.

In 1976, he served as an "issues director" on Jimmy Carter's presidential campaign and came to appreciate the political significance of the rise in contemporary Southern culture. According to Ralph Whitehead, a professor of journalism at the University of Massachusetts at Amherst, this experience encouraged Stark to develop "the American-studies view of politics: that what happens in politics is often an expression of deeper cultural and psychological forces that are at work in the country." In addition to writing for The Boston Phoenix, Stark contributed as an op-ed columnist to The Boston Globe and wrote a column on international sport for the Montreal Gazette.

On his website, Stark's former role as an NPR broadcaster is described as his attempt to "interpret American culture to the rest of the world". Stark's first book, Glued to the Set: The 60 Television Shows and Events That Made Us Who We Are Today, was published in 1997.

In 1999, Doubleday published Stark's book Writing to Win: The Legal Writer, in which he espoused an approach in legal correspondence and in the courtroom of brevity and simplicity. Among the endorsements for the book, Laurence Tribe described it as an "invaluable" work that would benefit students and most practicing lawyers alike.

Stark's book Meet the Beatles: A Cultural History of the Band That Shook Youth, Gender, and the World was published in 2005 by HarperCollins. Three years before its publication, he moved to Chester, near Liverpool, in the north of England, to carry out research into the Beatles phenomenon.

Kirkus Reviews said that Meet the Beatles offered little insight on the band that had not been unearthed by previous studies into their international impact. By contrast, James Rosen of The Washington Post appreciated the author's focus on how the Beatles' feminine qualities were a key factor in the group's appeal, and said the book was a "thoughtful, provocative and ultimately valuable contribution to the literature of the Beatles". Don Aucoin wrote in The Boston Globe that in analysing the band's impact, "[Stark] captures also the sheer waves of joy the Beatles sent through the world, how they transformed youth culture, legitimized rock 'n' roll as an art form, and hastened the globalization of business and communications." Publishers Weekly said: "A thorough biography of the band ... Stark is sharp and insightful."

Stark has lectured in law at Harvard Law School. He has also published fiction, poetry in the chapbook format, and exhibited as an artist. He currently lives in Boston, Massachusetts and works as a consultant to the legal and other professions, teaching courses on speaking and writing. He married Sarah Wald, also a lawyer and academic, in October 1979, and the couple have two sons.
