= A Little Love (album) =

Studio album by Fiona Fung
- Released: 20 November 2008
- Genre: Pop
- Length: 1:01:54
- Language: Cantonese, Mandarin, English, Japanese
- Label: Sony Music
- Producer: Chan Kwong-wing

Fiona Fung chronology
A Little Love (2008)	Sweet Melody (2010)

A Little Love is the debut studio album by Hong Kong–based artist Fiona Fung, under the label Sony Music.

The album has two editions. The CD + DVD edition was released on 20 November 2008, which was the first edition. It features three music videos and a video of Fiona's Tokyo trip. The second edition being, in Blu-spec CD format, was subsequently released on 13 January 2010.

The records were pressed in Japan to ensure perfect sound quality.

== Track listing ==
All music is composed by Chan Kwong-wing.

No.	Title	Lyrics	Length
1.	"The Glorious Death" (incidental music of Twins Effect)	N/A	1:02
2.	"陽光．雨"	Fiona Fung	3:28
3.	"More Than Light"	N/A	0:51
4.	"遙遠的…"	Fiona Fung, Canis Wong	3:17
5.	"A Wonderful Day"	Anders Lee	1:19
6.	"火星原居民"	Fiona Fung	3:10
7.	"隻眼閉"	Fiona Fung	3:39
8.	"Hidden Romance"	N/A	1:10
9.	"幸運兒"	Fiona Fung	3:47
10.	"Fun For Sharing"	Zhe Zhiu-yan	1:05
11.	"Proud of You"	Anders Lee	3:07
12.	"我在那一角落患過傷風"	N/A	1:54
13.	"Shining Friends"	Anders Lee	1:46
14.	"再見…警察" (incidental music of Infernal Affairs)	N/A	2:17
15.	"Forever Friends"	Fiona Fung, Anders Lee	3:03
16.	"Shine of the Century"	N/A	1:02
17.	"小傷口"	Fiona Fung	4:06
18.	"在你身邊"	Fiona Fung	1:06
19.	"救生圈"	Fiona Fung	3:14
20.	"一點點的回憶"	Fiona Fung	1:05
21.	"Flow"	N/A	2:56
22.	"I Love Sunshine"	N/A	1:01
23.	"A Little Love"	Fiona Fung, Anders Lee	3:09
24.	"Free"	N/A	0:39
25.	"避風港"	Fiona Fung	3:46
26.	"Special Crew"	Anders Lee	0:51
27.	"不做你的情人" (film score of Single Blog)	Fiona Fung	2:59
Total length:			1:01:54

== See also ==
- Sweet Melody
