= January February =

Single by Barbara Dickson

from the album The Barbara Dickson Album
- B-side: "Island in the Snow"
- Released: 7 March 1980
- Recorded: 1979
- Genre: Pop
- Length: 3:35
- Label: Epic Records
- Songwriter: Alan Tarney
- Producer: Alan Tarney

Barbara Dickson singles chronology
"Caravan Song" (1979)	"January February" (1980)	"In the Night" (1980)

"January February" is a song recorded by Scottish singer Barbara Dickson, written and produced by Alan Tarney. It was released on 7 March 1980 by Epic Records, and peaked at No. 11 on the UK Singles Chart for the week ending 12 April 1980, spending 10 weeks on the chart. It also made the Top 20 in the German and South African charts and 64 in Australia.

The song signalled a new direction in her career, moving into the mainstream pop genre. Isaac Guillory played guitar on the song; he also appeared in the music video and helped promote the song on TV.

The single was originally planned to be released on 25 January 1980, but held back when her previous single ("Caravan Song") began to rise in the charts.
