= Can't Blame the Youth =

Compilation album by Peter Tosh
- Released: July 26, 2004
- Genre: Reggae
- Length: 50:41
- Label: Universal I.S. JAD Records

Peter Tosh chronology
The Best Of Peter Tosh 1978–1987 (2003)	Can't Blame the Youth (2004)	Black Dignity (JAD) (2004)

Professional ratings
Review scores
Source	Rating
Allmusic	4/5 stars

Can't Blame the Youth is a compilation album of Peter Tosh's work while with The Wailers. It was released in 2004.

== Track listing ==
All tracks composed and arranged by Peter Tosh except where noted.

No.	Title	Writer(s)	Length
1.	"Can't Blame the Youth"		3:13
2.	"Arise Blackman"		2:39
3.	"Lion"		3:46
4.	"Maga Dog"		2:48
5.	"Go, Tell It on the Mountain"	Traditional	3:14
6.	"Here Comes the Judge"		3:29
7.	"Four Hundred Years"		2:32
8.	"Soon Come"		2:22
9.	"Here Comes the Sun"	George Harrison	3:14
10.	"Little Green Apples"	Bobby Russell	2:35
11.	"Them a Fi Get a Beatin'"		1:51
12.	"You Can't Fool Me Again"		2:33
13.	"Leave My Business Alone"		3:22
14.	"Love"		2:54
15.	"A Little Love"		2:40
16.	"We Can Make It Uptight"		2:55
17.	"Evil Version"		2:13
18.	"My Sympathy"		2:21

== Personnel ==
- Digital Restoration, Mastering - David Blackman
- Concept, Sleeve Notes, Track Titles - Jeremy Collingwood
- Producer - Joe Gibbs
- Photography - Ossie Hamilton
- Composer - George Harrison, Bobby Russell, Peter Tosh, Traditional
- Producer - Leslie Kong; Prince Tony, Peter Tosh
- Executive Producer - David Simmons, Danny Sims
- Primary Artist - Peter Tosh

== See also ==
- List of anti-war songs
