= Barbara Dickson =

Scottish singer and actress (born 1947)

Barbara Dickson OBE
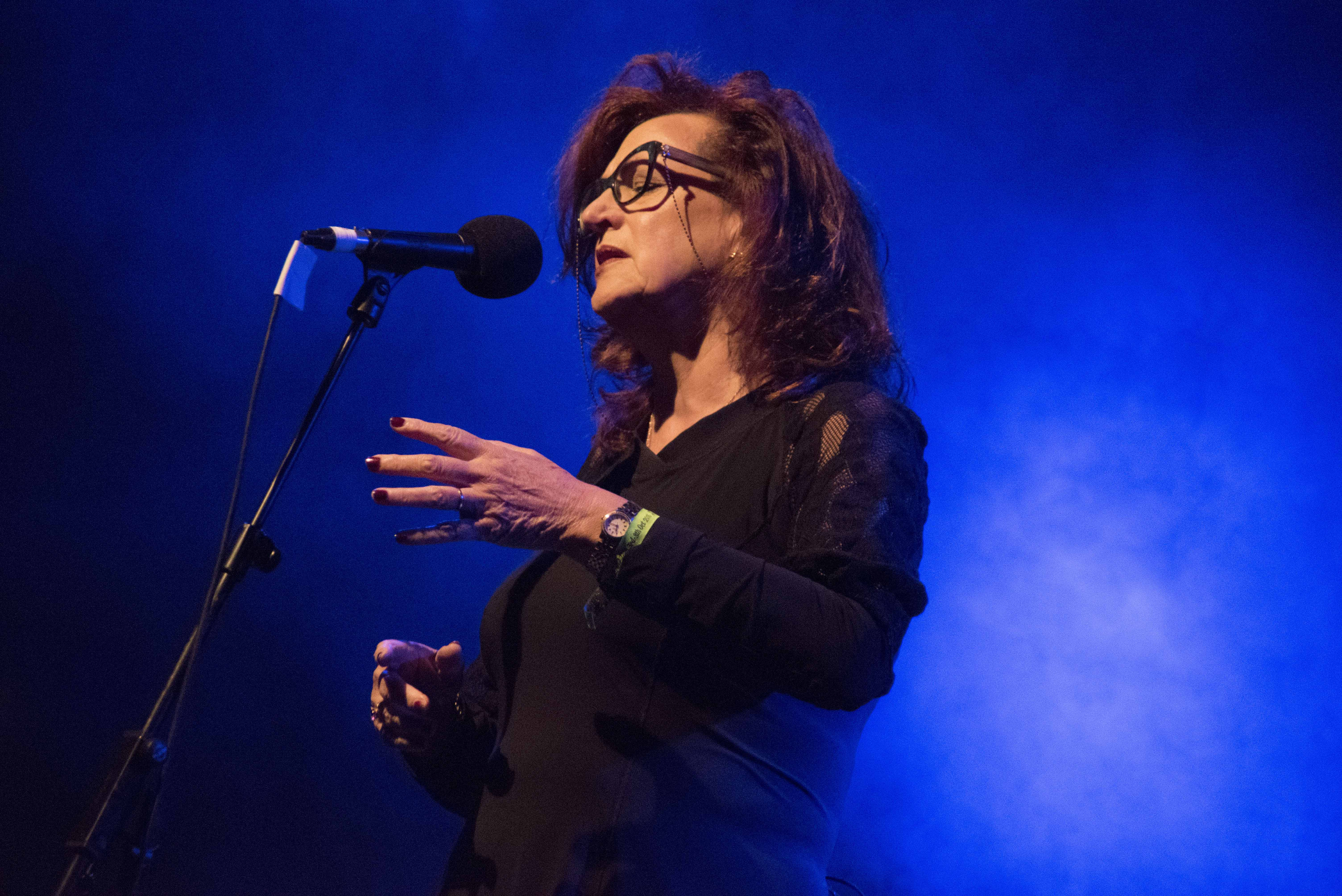
- Dickson in 2015

Background information
- Born: Barbara Ruth Dickson; 27 September 1947 (age 78); Dunfermline, Fife, Scotland
- Occupations: Singer-songwriter; musician; actress; presenter
- Instruments: Vocals; guitar; piano
- Years active: 1968–present
- Labels: RSO; Epic; Voiceprint; Greentrax; Transatlantic
- Website: www.barbaradickson.net

Barbara Ruth Dickson OBE (born 27 September 1947) is a Scottish singer and actress whose hits include "I Know Him So Well" (a chart-topping duet with Elaine Paige), "Answer Me" and "January February". Dickson has placed fifteen albums on the UK Albums Chart from 1977 to date, and had a number of hit singles, including four which reached the top 20 on the UK Singles Chart. The Scotsman newspaper has described her as Scotland's best-selling female singer in terms of the numbers of hit chart singles and albums she has achieved in the UK since 1976.

She is also a two-time Olivier Award-winning actress, with roles including Viv Nicholson in the musical Spend Spend Spend, and was the original Mrs. Johnstone in Willy Russell's long-running musical Blood Brothers. On television she starred as Anita Braithwaite in Band of Gold.

== Early life ==
Dickson was born in Dunfermline and went to Woodmill High School. She spent her early childhood in Rosyth before her family moved to Dunfermline in the 1950s. Her father was a cook on a tugboat at Rosyth Dockyard and her mother Ruth Malley of Irish descent was from Liverpool. She went to Pitcorthie Primary School when she moved to Dunfermline.

== Career ==
=== Early years ===
Dickson's singing career started in folk clubs around her native Fife in 1964. Her first commercial recording was in 1968. Her early work included albums with Archie Fisher, the first of which, The Fate O' Charlie, a collection of songs from the Jacobite rebellions, was released in 1969. Her first solo album was Do Right Woman in 1970.

=== 1970s–1980s ===
She became a well-known face on the British folk circuit of the late 1960s and early 1970s, but changed her career course after meeting Willy Russell. He was at that time a young student running a folk club in Liverpool. He showed Dickson the first draft of what later became the award-winning musical John, Paul, George, Ringo ... and Bert and asked her to perform the music. The combination of his writing, the cast (including Antony Sher, Bernard Hill and Trevor Eve, who were unknown at the time) and Dickson's idiosyncratic interpretation of Beatles songs made the show highly successful.

The show's co-producer, Robert Stigwood, signed Dickson to his record label, RSO Records, for whom she recorded the album Answer Me, arranged and produced by Junior Campbell, the title track becoming a top 10 hit in 1976. John, Paul, George, Ringo … and Bert also led to her guest residency on The Two Ronnies, which brought Dickson's singing to the attention of more than ten million BBC Television viewers every week.

Andrew Lloyd Webber and Tim Rice also spotted Dickson in John, Paul, George, Ringo … and Bert, and invited her to record "Another Suitcase in Another Hall" from their new musical Evita, which became her second hit in 1977. She contributed two tracks to Scouse the Mouse a children's album (1977) with Ringo Starr and others. During the late 1970s, Dickson also contributed backing vocals to two best-selling albums by the Scottish singer-songwriter Gerry Rafferty: City to City (1978) and Night Owl (1979). Other solo hits, including "Caravan Song" and "January February", followed for Dickson in 1980.

An abridged version of the song "Best of Friends", sung by Dickson, was used as the closing theme for Andy Robson, an ITV children's television series broadcast during 1982 and 1983. It was never released commercially until 2021 when the full version featured on the Special Edition release of Dickson's album Heartbeats.

In 1982, Willy Russell invited Dickson to star in his new musical Blood Brothers in the pivotal role of the mother, Mrs Johnstone. Although at first reluctant to accept, having never acted before, she accepted, and garnered critical acclaim, as well as the Laurence Olivier Award for Best Actress in a Musical in 1983. She has reprised the role many times, including in 2004 at the Liverpool Empire Theatre.

In 1984, Tim Rice approached Dickson to take part in the recording of the concept album for the musical Chess in the role of Svetlana. Dickson's songs on the album include "I Know Him So Well", a duet sung with Elaine Paige. The song was a worldwide hit, and remained at number one on the UK Singles Chart for four weeks. According to Guinness World Records, it remains the best-selling female duet.

Starting in 1983, Dickson and her backing band began appearing in musical interludes for the BBC Scotland comedy show Scotch and Wry. In 1984, Dickson starred in her own television special for BBC2, in which she travelled around Scotland.

=== 1990s ===
During the 1990s, Dickson appeared in various television dramas, including Taggart, Band of Gold and The Missing Postman. The writer and director Chris Bond created a stage show for Dickson in 1996 called The Seven Ages of Woman, which won her the Liverpool Echo Actress of the Year Award. It premiered at the Liverpool Playhouse and toured extensively in 1997 and 1998.

She was the subject of This Is Your Life in 1998, when she was surprised by Michael Aspel at the Groucho Club in London.

In 1999, Dickson starred in Spend Spend Spend, a new musical by Steve Brown and Justin Greene. The show, based on the rollercoaster life story of pools winner, Viv Nicholson, played in the West End to capacity audiences. For her portrayal of Nicholson, Dickson was awarded Best Actress in a Musical at the 2000 Laurence Olivier Awards. Dickson went on to star in the UK tour of the show.

Further theatre work followed in Friends Like This, the Heather Brothers musical A Slice of Saturday Night and Fame. During 2006, Dickson appeared as the Timekeeper in Alan Ayckbourn and Denis King's fantasy musical play Whenever for BBC Radio 4. She returned to television in the BBC daytime drama series Doctors with her episode, "Mama Sings The Blues", being broadcast in March 2008.

In 2003, Dickson worked with Russell again, providing backing vocals for his album Hoovering the Moon. In 2004, The Platinum Collection, featuring some of her most successful recordings, reached number 35 in the UK Albums Chart. Her 2004 album, Full Circle, was produced and arranged by Troy Donockley, and saw Dickson returning to her folk roots. In 2006, she issued a collection of the songs of Lennon, McCartney and Harrison, Nothing's Gonna Change My World.

=== 21st century ===
Dickson's twenty-fourth studio album, Time and Tide, was released in January 2008, featuring a mix of contemporary and folk songs, including "Palm Sunday", which marked Dickson's return to songwriting after a break of almost twenty years. A live DVD, Into the Light, was released to coincide with the release of Time and Tide, and included, as well as some of her best-loved hits, several tracks from her new album. A double live CD, Barbara Dickson in Concert, was released in April 2009, and was followed later in the year by her autobiography, A Shirt Box Full of Songs.

Between February and March 2011, Dickson undertook a tour of the UK and Ireland to promote her new studio album, Words Unspoken. Arranged and produced by Troy Donockley, the album included tracks such as "Bridge Over Troubled Water", "Jamie Raeburn" and "The Trees They Do Grow High".

A tribute album to her friend Gerry Rafferty – To Each And Everyone – The Songs of Gerry Rafferty – was released in September 2013, and her album, Winter, a collection of seasonal favourites, was released in time for Christmas 2014.

2018's Through Line was followed by Time Is Going Faster, Dickson's 25th studio album, which spent three months in the Official Folk Album Chart and received widespread acclaim, particularly for her own compositions. The single, "Where Shadows Meet The Light", marked her first single release since 1995's "Love Hurts". A completely revised and updated paperback edition of Dickson's autobiography, A Shirt Box Full of Songs, was released to tie-in with the new album, together with an audiobook and Kindle edition.

Her first online show, Barbara Dickson: Ballads And Blether, streamed on 20 March 2021 with a limited-edition DVD and CD of the evening available through her official website. The same year, she presented a series of podcasts, Answer Me Ten... With Barbara Dickson, in which she interviewed several well-known female singers, including Petula Clark, Toyah, Kiki Dee, Kim Wilde and Eddi Reader.

Between March and April 2022, Dickson and her band toured the UK in support of the album Time Is Going Faster.

In March 2022, Dickson starred in BBC Radio 4's The Road and the Miles to Dundee, written by Val McDermid and directed by Turan Ali.

== Personal life ==
In 1984, Dickson married former actor Oliver Cookson, who went on to work as an Assistant Director in television for the BBC, and has three sons. As of 2015, she and her family had lived in Edinburgh for a number of years. She was appointed an OBE in the Queen's New Year Honours in 2002 for her services to Music and Drama.

Interviewed for Fern Britton Meets in 2017, Dickson discussed her conversion to Catholicism while living in Richmond during her 30s, and the crisis that she had suffered while appearing in Willy Russell's Blood Brothers 2004 Liverpool stage production. It resulted in Dickson taking a four-week break from her starring role; once she had sufficiently recuperated, Dickson moved to London's West End, when the Blood Brothers Liverpool run transferred there. She said that her personal crisis led to many years of stage fright and she withdrew from public performing until therapy helped to work through her anxieties.
