= The Wrong Boy =

Book by Willy Russell

First edition (publ. Doubleday)

The Wrong Boy, published in 2000, is playwright Willy Russell’s first novel.

Russell is mainly known for his plays Educating Rita and Shirley Valentine which have both been made into films, and Blood Brothers, a musical.

The Wrong Boy, like Educating Rita & Our Day Out, is about education; this time about a teenage boy who falls foul of the British educational system, and how he eventually ‘makes good’.
