= Stags and Hens =

Play written by Willy Russell

- Written by: Willy Russell
- Original language: English
- Setting: Liverpool, 1970s

Premiere
- Date premiered: October 1978
- Place premiered: Everyman Theatre

Stags and Hens is a play written by Willy Russell. Like most of Willy Russell's work, the play discusses working class society in England in the 1970s. It makes comments about the working class' intellect, life, party habits and the exclusion of the different.

It was originally written in 1978 for television and drama students of the then-Manchester Polytechnic, as an in-house television production. It was first published as a script in 1986 in a collection with Educating Rita and Blood Brothers.

Russell adapted it for performance in 2008 as Stags and Hens – The Remix at The Royal Court Theatre, Liverpool. The play ran in February to March 2008, directed by Bob Eaton. Russell says that "I wanted the play to move at a kind of pace that was more in keeping with a theatrical tempo that has significantly increased in the thirty years since the play was first seen.", though he "vehemently disagrees" with the suggestion that he was "pandering to the needs of an audience" with a "limited attention span and who must increasingly be spoon-fed". It now numbers 90 pages. The play has become successful and is now popularly used in schools.

Russell adapted the play into a TV movie called Dancin' Thru the Dark, which was filmed in 1990.

== Plot ==
The play is set in a trashy 1970s disco in Liverpool, England. The action is mainly in the gents and women's toilets of the disco where both Linda (The Bride) and Dave (The Groom) have decided to hold their stags and hens nights, not knowing that their other half is at the same place. When Linda's ex-boyfriend, Peter, arrives this causes an uproar between Linda and Dave's friends and when Linda's hen party get a say in all whats happening the two groups gang together to stop Linda taking up the offer of an escape with her ex Peter she is then forced with a difficult decision – to stay or to go.

== Characters ==
- Linda – The Bride
- Dave – The Dickhead – The Groom
- Eddy – The Violent Best-Man
- Robbie – The Ladies Man
- Billy – The Oddball
- Kav – The Piss Artist
- Peter – The Musician
- Frances – The Best Friend
- Carol – The Work Colleague
- Bernadette – The Dictator
- Maureen – The Drunken Cry-Baby
- Roadie – The Work Obsessed Southerner

== Reception ==
The work was received reasonably well. The Daily Telegraph said that it "combines comedy with acrid truth in the style Willy Russell has made unmistakably his own... and hits on brilliantly the herd instinct driving both sexes onward and bedward". The Guardian called it a "bleakly funny and perceptive study of working class misogyny, Puritanism and waste." The Financial Times however described it as "firmly in the centre of the playwright's best achievements: lively, coarse, well-organised, truthful and very funny." The Stage wrote that the 2008 production had "...outstanding writing, superlative direction and fabulous performances all round, Stags and Hens is a play that remains a great deal of fun and is guaranteed to have audiences chuckling and empathising with everyone on stage."
