= Iona Banks =

Welsh actress

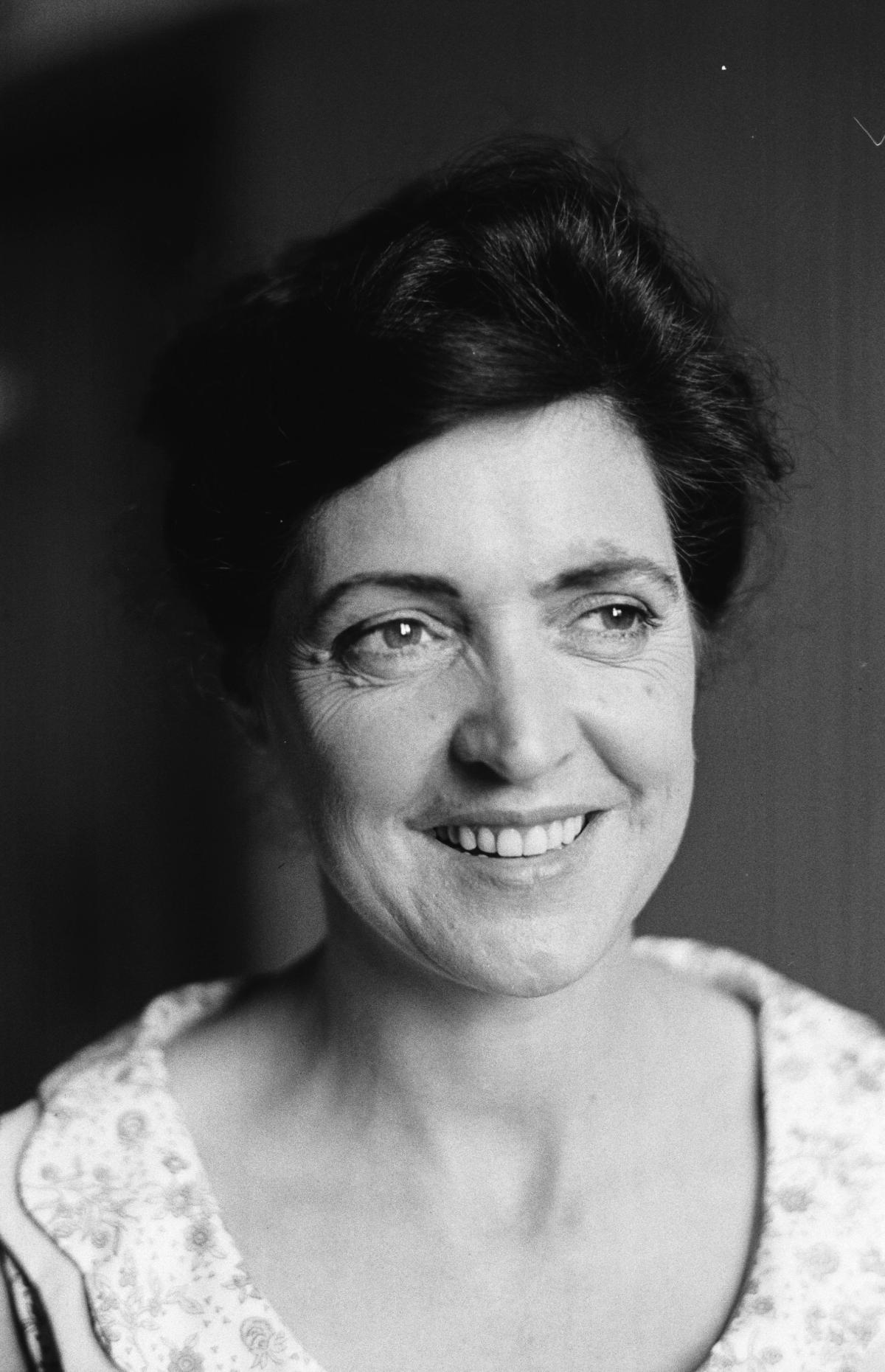
- Iona Banks
- Born: 20 December 1920; Ruabon, Wales, UK
- Died: 20 May 2008 (aged 87)
- Occupation: Actress

Iona Banks (20 December 1920 – 20 May 2008) was a Welsh actress from Trelogan, Sir y Fflint. She played Mrs. Roberts in Our Day Out (1977), Mrs Roberts in Part 2 of Willy Russell's 1983 TV series One Summer and barmaid Gwladys Lake in the Welsh television soap opera Pobol y Cwm.
