= Stephanie Lawrence =

British actress

- Lawrence as Pearl in the original cast of Starlight Express, 1984
- Born: 16 December 1949; Newcastle, England, UK
- Died: 4 November 2000 (aged 50); London, England, UK

Stephanie Lawrence (16 December 1949 – 4 November 2000) was a British musical theatre actress.

== Background ==
Stephanie Lawrence was born in 1949 in Newcastle, England. She was brought up on Hayling Island in Hampshire. Her father was a Welsh singer and her mother was a classically trained dancer who later formed a children's dance troupe, the Kent Babes. From an early age she was close friends with another famous Islander, Peter Chilvers, who, in 1958, invented a sail-driven surfboard.

== Career ==
=== Theatre ===
Having trained at the Arts Educational School, Tring, Hertfordshire (now Tring Park School for the Performing Arts), she made her debut in The Nutcracker at the Royal Festival Hall in London in 1962. She became a member of the corps de ballet at the Royal Festival Ballet at the age of 12 with the intention of becoming a ballerina, however, her plans were disrupted when she was forced to miss a year after contracting pneumonia aged 15.

Her West End debut came in April 1971, playing the part of a rollerskating tap dancer in Forget-Me-Not Lane. Her first musical appearance in the West End was in Bubbling Brown Sugar.

==== Evita ====
In 1980, Lawrence was cast as the alternate to Marti Webb as Eva Peron in the musical Evita, written by Tim Rice and Andrew Lloyd Webber. Webb had previously played the role while Elaine Paige was on holiday and was persuaded by director Hal Prince to remain with the production to perform twice weekly, in anticipation of succeeding from Paige at the end of her contract. This established a precedent which would continue for the remainder of the show's London run. Lawrence subsequently graduated from alternate to main performer in 1981.

==== Musical theatre in the 1980s ====
During the 1980s, Lawrence carved out a career as one of the leading female musical theatre performers in London.

She left Evita to create the title role of Marilyn Monroe in Marilyn! the Musical, which won her outstanding reviews and the Best Actress of the Year Award from the Variety Club of Great Britain as well as a nomination from the Society of West End Theatre Awards (now the Laurence Olivier Awards).

She was then cast as Pearl, the principal female role, in the original London production of Starlight Express, in which she performed on roller-skates.

Lawrence appeared in a musical version of The Blue Angel at the Bristol Old Vic, in which she played the character of Lola-Lola, made famous by Marlene Dietrich in the movie of the same name.

She sang the song ‘Special kind of Hero’ in the 1986 FIFA World Cup Film giving tribute to one of the all-time greats of football, Diego Maradona.

In 1987, she appeared as Louise in the first replacement cast of the Dave Clark musical Time, opposite David Cassidy.

Immediately afterwards, she succeeded Nichola McAuliffe as Kate/Lili Vanessi in the RSC production of Kiss Me Kate at the Savoy Theatre. Over Christmas of 1988 into early 1989 she played the eponymous Cinderella in the pantomime, opposite Lionel Blair as Buttons. In 1990 she toured with the musical Blues in the Night playing The Woman of the World.

==== "Straight" theatre ====
In 1986, Lawrence took on her first dramatic part as Doris in The Owl and the Pussycat touring with Peter Davison. Soon after this she appeared at Oslo International Cabaret in her one-woman show.

==== Blood Brothers ====
In 1990, Lawrence took the role of Mrs. Johnstone in the revival of Willy Russell's Blood Brothers. She played the role for three years, first at the Albery Theatre then subsequently the Phoenix Theatre in London, before moving to create the role in the original Broadway production at the Music Box Theatre in New York City (1993). She was nominated for a Tony Award and won the Theatre World Award for Outstanding Broadway Debut. She would play the part of Mrs Johnstone on and off for the next few years, during which she performed on the 1995 London Cast Recording. She had to pull out of the production after suffering from exhaustion. After her untimely death, the London production's souvenir brochure included a tribute on the rear cover for a number of years.

=== Later career ===
Lawrence was cast in the role of Grizabella in Cats in the West End in 1998. During this time, she received critical injuries after falling down a flight of stairs. Lawrence was fired due to her alcoholism.

=== Film ===
In 1987, Lawrence was cast as Frannie in the film Buster, opposite Phil Collins, Julie Walters and Larry Lamb. The film depicted the story of Great Train Robbery of 1963, with her character being the wife of gang leader Bruce Reynolds. Her other film credits include The Likely Lads (1976) and the role of La Carlotta in The Phantom of the Opera (1989).

=== Television ===
Lawrence was briefly a member of the dance troupe Pan's People, during the late 1970s, long after the troupe had ceased performing on Top of the Pops.

Lawrence portrayed Mary Magdalene in the ITV play Doubting Thomas in 1983.

In 1982, Lawrence appeared in the BBC Two series The Vocal Touch, in an episode which was a showcase for her talents as a singer and actress. She was featured in an episode of Night Music on BBC One in 1983 and Six Fifty-Five on BBC Two during the same year. She also appeared on Des O'Connor Tonight, Pete Sayers' Electric Music Show, The Two Ronnies, Wogan, It's Max Boyce, Pebble Mill at One and The Les Dawson Show.

=== Recording ===
In 1979, she recorded a duet with Johnny Mathis, "You Saved My Life", which featured on his Columbia Records album Mathis Magic. In 1986 she sang "A Special Kind of Hero", written by Rick Wakeman for the official FIFA film of the tournament.

From 1990 onwards, she appeared in a number of recordings for Pickwick Records series The Shows Collection, which was produced by Gordon Lorenz and featured compilations from musical theatre, including a number of Andrew Lloyd Webber shows. Other regular performers on the albums included Paul Jones, Fiona Hendley, Jess Conrad and Carl Wayne. In 1993, Pickwick released Footlights: A Tribute to Andrew Lloyd Webber, a rare solo album in the series.

== Personal life ==
Lawrence married Laurie Sautereau in September 2000.

== Death ==
Lawrence died on 4 November 2000, aged 50, from liver disease. She was found by her husband at their London home.

== Discography ==
=== Solo albums ===
Album	Release year	Label	Tracks
Footlights: A Tribute to Andrew Lloyd Webber	1993	Pickwick Records	1. Footlights; 2. Wishing You Were Somehow Here Again; 3. Chanson D'Enfance; 4. Macavity, the Mystery Cat; 5. Anything But Lonely; 6. Think Of Me; 7. There Is More To Love; 8. Another Suitcase In Another Hall; 9. The First Man You Remember; 10. All I Ask Of You; 11. Pie Jesu; 12. Footlights (Reprise)
Marilyn: The Legend	1996	Carlton Sounds	1. Candle In The Wind; 2. The Most Beautiful Girl; 3. I'm Thru With Love; 4. She Acts Like A Woman Should; 5. Heat Wave; 6. I Wanna Be Loved By You; 7. Diamond's Are A Girl's Best Friend; 8. That's Why; 9. Medley: Some Like It Hot/Running Wild; 10. My Heart Belongs To Daddy; 11. When Love Goes Wrong (Nothing Goes Right); 12. It Was Not Meant To Be; 13. Nobody Answers; 14. Candle In The Wind (Reprise)

=== Singles ===
- "Time and Emotion Man" (1979)
- "You Saved My Life" (1979) with Johnny Mathis
- "Only He Has the Power to Move Me" (1984)
- "Am I Asking Too Much?" (1985)
- "A Special Kind of Hero" (1986 FIFA World Cup theme)
- "You Saved My Life"

=== Cast recordings ===
- Bubbling Brown Sugar: Original London Cast Recording
- Swan Esther – studio concept recording (1983)
- Starlight Express: Original Cast Recording (1984)
- Blood Brothers: The 1995 London Cast Recording (1995)
- In The Red

=== Compilation albums ===
Album	Release year	Label	Notes	Tracks
The Music of Andrew Lloyd Webber	1988	First Night Records	A compilation album, recorded with The Royal Philharmonic Orchestra, also featuring Paul Nicholas, Jacqueline Barron and James Rainbird. Lawrence's tracks were later included in a First Night Records compilation, The Love Songs of Andrew Lloyd Webber, also featuring tracks from Marti Webb's 1989 album Performance.	"Don't Cry for Me Argentina"; "I Don't Know How to Love Him"; "Take That Look Off Your Face"; "Only He"; "Tell Me on a Sunday"; "The Last Man in My Life"; "Memory"
The Andrew Lloyd Webber Collection	1991	Pickwick Records	The first album in The Shows Collection series, also featuring Paul Jones, Fiona Hendley, Jess Conrad and Carl Wayne.	"Macavity, the Mystery Cat"; "All I Ask of You" (duet with Carl Wayne); "Wishing You Were Somehow Here Again"
The Magic of Andrew Lloyd Webber	1992	Pickwick Records	Part of The Shows Collection series	
The Andrew Lloyd Webber Songbook	1993	Pickwick Records	Part of The Shows Collection series	"Chanson D'Enfance"; "Anything But Lonely"; "Think of Me"
Music and Songs from The Phantom of the Opera and Aspects of Love		Pickwick Records	Part of The Shows Collection series	"All I Ask of You" (duet with Carl Wayne); "Wishing You Were Somehow Here Again"; "Think of Me"; "There is More to Love"; "The First Man You Remember" (Duet with Dave Willetts); "Chanson D'Enfance"; "Anything But Lonely"
Music and Songs from Starlight Express and Cats		Pickwick Records	Part of The Shows Collection series	"U.N.C.O.U.P.L.E.D."; "Next Time You Fall in Love"; "Grizabella, The Glamour Cat"; "Macavity, The Mystery Cat"

== Theatre ==
Show	Year	Role	Notes
The Nutcracker	1962		
Forget Me Not Lane			
Bubbling Brown Sugar			
Evita	1980	Eva Peron	Initially alternate to Marti Webb, then full-time from 1981
Marilyn! the Musical	1983	Marilyn Monroe	Created role in the original London production
Starlight Express	1984	Pearl	Created role in the original London production
The Owl and the Pussycat	1986	Doris	
Time	1987	Louise	First replacement cast, opposite David Cassidy
The Blue Angel		Lola-Lola	
Kiss Me Kate	1988	Kate/Lili Vanessi	
Blues in the Night	1990	The Woman of the World	
Blood Brothers	1990	Mrs Johnstone	Appeared on Broadway in the role in 1993
Cats	1998	Grizabella	

== Filmography ==
Film	Year	Role
O Lucky Man!	1973	
The Tarbuck Follies	1973	One of the Lionel Blair dancers
The Likely Lads (film)	1976	Demonstrator
Larry Grayson	1977	Dancer
The Benny Hill Show	1978	Dancer / various roles
Golden Gala	1978	
Cooper's Half Hour	1980	
London Night Out	1981	
The Two Ronnies	1983	Performing "The Right to Sing"
Doubting Thomas	1983	
Punchlines!	1983-4	
The Two Ronnies	1984	Performing "Love Has a Mind of Its Own"
A Royal Night of 100 Stars	1985	
Buster	1988	Franny Reynolds
The Phantom of the Opera	1989	La Carlotta
