= Our Day Out =

- Play for Today episode
- Episode no.: Series 8 Episode 16
- Directed by: Pedr James
- Written by: Willy Russell
- Original air date: 28 December 1977

Episode chronology
← Previous "Destiny"	Next → "The After-Dinner Joke"

"Our Day Out" is the 16th episode of the eighth season of the British BBC anthology TV series Play for Today. The episode was a television play that was originally broadcast on 28 December 1977. "Our Day Out" was written by Willy Russell, directed by Pedr James, produced by David Rose, and starred Jean Heywood, Alun Armstrong, Elizabeth Estensen, Robert Gillespie, Iona Banks, and Peter Tilbury.

"Our Day Out" is about poor children from Liverpool, England. The play was later converted into a full length stage musical.

== Plot ==
The film is about a Liverpool secondary school’s trip to Conwy Castle in North Wales during the 1970s. The school is situated in a deprived district of the city, with the majority of the pupils being from impoverished and troubled families.

Mrs. Kay teaches a remedial class for illiterate children, called the "Progress Class". The whole class - along with Digga and Reilly, the slightly older class bullies who used to be in the Progress Class - are taken on a coach trip. In the original version, the headmaster, Mr. Briggs makes the decision to go on the trip as an extra member of staff, emphasising his mistrust of the liberal values of Mrs. Kay. In the shorter stage version, the headteacher commissions Mr. Briggs, the authoritarian deputy headmaster, to supervise the trip.

On the way to the castle, the coach stops at a roadside cafe with a snack shop, where the students take advantage of the storekeepers' confusion to shoplift sweets and snacks, unbeknownst to the teachers supervising. It makes a second stop at Colwyn Bay Mountain Zoo, where the students enjoy the animals so much that they try to steal most of them. The zoo attendant discovers this just in time before the coach pulls out and makes them return the animals.

When the coach finally reaches the castle, the students race around exploring the grounds, cliffs and beach. Soon it's time to leave but one of the best-behaved students, Carol, is missing. A search ensues and Mr. Briggs finally finds Carol, who is depressed because she doesn't want to return to her troubled family home. She wants a better life and wishes she lived in a nicer area, like the area which surrounds the castle. She becomes so upset that she threatens to jump off the cliff. Mr. Briggs, who up till this point has acted as a strict disciplinarian, policing the students' bad behaviour and expressing doubts that they should even be allowed to have an outing, shows a more understanding side as he convinces Carol not to jump and to rejoin the rest of the group.

At the suggestion of Mr. Briggs, the coach makes one more stop at a fairground where the students have some more fun before returning home. Mr. Briggs joins the students on some of the rides, wears a funny hat and joins in with the sing-song on the journey home, all of which is photographed by Mrs. Kay. She comments on how she never knew he had a softer side and that he certainly wouldn't be able to get away from the fact now she had evidence. Not wanting to undermine his strict image, Mr. Briggs offers to develop the photos, as he is a keen amateur photographer. Once he returns to his car, he unravels the undeveloped film, exposing and ruining the photos of him clowning around with the students.

Along the way, two young teachers, Susan and Colin, who are helping Mrs. Kay supervise, must also deal with the fact that Reilly has a crush on Susan, while two older girls in the group have a crush on Colin. Susan and Colin solve their problem by subtly suggesting that Digga and Reilly turn their attentions to the two girls.

== Origins and development ==
The television play "Our Day Out" was commissioned by the BBC as part of BBC Two's Play of the Week series.

Willy Russell had taught at Tiber street school, one of the locations used in the film and called on his experiences of school trips — as a teacher and as a child — when writing the screenplay, which he finished in five days.

In searching for young school children to feature in the film, director Pedr James spent a month visiting schools around Liverpool to find "the right kids". The child actors came from several schools around the Liverpool area although none had any real acting experience. Filming took place through April to May 1977. The film was shot on 16mm film by a first-time director in three weeks with a largely untrained cast.

The original television version was developed into a musical for the stage with songs by Willy Russell, Chris Mellor and Bob Eaton. This production, directed by Bob Eaton, was first performed at the Everyman Theatre, Liverpool in 1983.

== Post production ==
The young cast travelled to Manchester in mid-December 1977 to watch a special screening of the television film with others they had worked with. Julie Jones, who at the age of 13 played Carol, noted of her character that she was "a rather sad little girl" who came from a "tough home background". Following filming over four weeks in the spring of 1977, the production was broadcast on 28 December. Despite playing a key character and being highly rated by viewers, Jones noted that it was unlikely she would take a career in acting.

Due to popular demand, it was shown again in February 1978 as part of the BBC's Play for Today series and was also re-broadcast in 1979 and again in August 1990 and on BBC Four in 2008.

The television play was shown in many European countries including France and Germany. Roy Gibb, then Head of Sales for BBC Enterprises, observed that it was among their most successful exports and believed it was ideal for international audiences, given its emphasis on visual effects and contemporary humour.

== Differences from the musical ==
The most noticeable difference from the musical was the omission of the characters John and Mac, who, in the musical, are the rural shop owners in Wales who get robbed by the kids. In the filmed version, they are replaced by two women.

== DVD release ==
"Our Day Out" was released on DVD on 1 October 2018 by Simply Media TV.

== See also ==
- Our Day Out musical
