= Rebecca Storm =

- Born: Elizabeth Caroline Hewlett; 17 August 1957 (age 69); Shipley, Yorkshire, England
- Genre: musical theatre
- Occupations: Singer, actress
- Years active: 1984–present
- Website: rebeccastorm.com

Rebecca Storm is a British singer and musical theatre actress. Best known for her role as Mrs Johnstone in smash hit musical Blood Brothers. Her 1985 hit single "The Show" was the theme to the ITV television series Connie.

== Early career ==
Rebecca Storm found her passion for singing when she was 11, although she began singing nine years earlier. After studying Music and Drama at Leeds University, Storm toured the United Kingdom and mainland Europe with her own band singing folk and rock songs. At 23, she auditioned for and landed a role in Blood Brothers, her first musical show. Although a little young to play the character of Mrs. Johnstone, the Catholic Liverpudian mother of seven, author Willy Russell was captivated by her voice and gave her the role, aided by wardrobe and make-up. An album of songs from the show, Rebecca Storm Sings Blood Brothers, was released by CBS Ireland. She went on to play the role for several years.

== Musical theatre ==
Her role as Mrs. Johnstone gained rave reviews which catapulted her into the world of Musical theatre. Throughout her career she has played some of the most demanding roles for a leading lady including Eva Peron in Evita, Fantine in Les Misérables, Florence in Chess, Rose in Aspects of Love, Edith Piaf in Piaf, and Joan of Arc in Jeanne amongst others.

In 2003, she returned to the role of Mrs. Johnstone for a short run at the Cork Opera House, Belfast and Gaiety Theatre Dublin. In 2011 she again returned to the role of Mrs. Johnstone in the Gaiety Theatre Dublin.

In 2018/19 she appeared as Chris in Gary Barlow and Tim Firths production of Calendar Girls: The Musical as it toured the Uk and Ireland gaining rave reviews

She recently reprised her role as Mrs Johnstone in an Irish/English tour of "Blood Brothers" in 2026.

== Other work ==
In 1992 Storm starred in Hollywood Ladies, her tribute to influences from the silver screen including Barbra Streisand, Judy Garland, Julie Andrews and Gracie Fields which was awarded "Best Musical Review '92". On television, she has appeared on several shows including Wogan, Top of the Pops, The Late Late Show and her own hour-long specials, An Evening with Rebecca Storm and Rebecca Storm at the Cork Opera House.

She sang for the King of Norway at his coronation in 1991 and performed numerous times for the British royal family.

With an orchestra and backing singers, she performed "You Don't Bring Me Flowers – The Streisand Songbook" at the Cork Opera House and the National Concert Hall in Dublin.

In 2008 she acted as a mentor for the RTÉ TV show JAM – The Musical.

Storm was scheduled to perform in Annie The Musical for a short run in the Olympia Theatre, Dublin, in July 2009 and at the Cork Opera House in August 2009.

Storm is a past President of Hospital Radio Bedside, a radio station broadcast to hospitals in Bournemouth, Poole, Christchurch & Wimborne, UK.

== Recording career ==
In 1985, Storm released the single with "The Show", the theme to the ITV drama series Connie, which peaked at number 15 in the UK. The song was written by Willy Russell and Ron Hutchinson (who created the series itself). This was followed by a second single "Mr. Love" in July 1986 which was from the film of the same name, though this did not chart. A third single "The Wrong Girl", B-side "Swansong", in August 1986 was followed by a 1988 single of two tracks from Evita.

Storm has received awards for her albums Ovation, Broadway by Storm and Ireland by Storm. In 2000 she released I Want to Know What Love Is and in 2003 she released Celtic n'Broadway (Sony BMG). To celebrate her 25 years in the entertainment industry, Storm was set to release an album of old and new material in 2009.

=== Discography ===
Albums

- Broadway By Storm – CBS – 1988
- We Never Said Goodbye – No Label – 1996
- Celtic 'N' Broadway – Sony BMG – 2003
- The Essential Rebecca Storm – Beaumex – 2011

Singles

- The Show (vocal) / The Show (Instrumental) [Theme From 'Connie'] – Towerbell Records – 1985
- Mr. Love / Mr. King – Columbia – 1986
- The Wrong Girl / Swansong – Spirit Records Ltd. – 1986

== Personal life ==
Storm lives with her husband Kenny Shearer, a musician, arranger & producer, in County Kildare, Ireland. She has a daughter Becky from a previous relationship, who is a teacher & singer-songwriter, having starred in the musical Once.
