= Blood Brothers: The 1995 London Cast Recording =

Studio album by 1995 London Cast of Blood Brothers
- Released: 1995
- Recorded: Air Studios Lyndhurst Hall, Redan Recorders, Maison Rouge, Matrix Studio
- Genre: musical theatre
- Label: First Night Records

Blood Brothers: The 1995 London Cast Recording is a studio album featuring the score of the musical Blood Brothers by Willy Russell.

== Background ==
A recording of the original London production of the show was released in 1983, featuring Barbara Dickson in the lead role of Mrs Johnstone. After touring the UK, the producer Bill Kenwright opened another production in London at the Albery Theatre in 1988. An album featuring that cast, including Kiki Dee as Mrs Johnstone, was released the same year. The production moved to the Phoenix Theatre in 1991, where it continued to run until 2012. The cast of that production was recorded in 1995.

== Production ==
The album was recorded at Air Studios Lyndhurst Hall, Redan Recorders, Maison Rouge and Matrix Studio. It was mixed at Air Studios Lyndhurst Hall.

== Track listing ==
All tracks are written by Willy Russell.

1. Overture
2. Marilyn Monroe
3. My Child
4. Easy Terms
5. Shoes Upon the Table
6. July 18
7. Kids' Game
8. Gypsies in the Wood
9. Long Sunday Afternoon/My Friend
10. Bright New Day
11. Entr'acte/Marilyn Monroe 2
12. Secrets
13. That Guy
14. Summer Sequence
15. I'm Not Saying a Word
16. One Day in October
17. Take a Letter Miss Jones
18. The Robbery
19. Marilyn Monroe 3
20. Light Romance/Madman
21. The Council Chamber
22. Tell Me It's Not True

== Personnel ==
=== Performers ===
- Stephanie Lawrence - Mrs Johnstone
- Paul Crosby - Mickey
- Mark Hutchinson - Eddie
- Warwick Evans - Narrator
- Joanna Monro - Mrs Lyons
- David Hitchen - Mr Lyons
- Joe Young - Sammy
- Jacintha Whyte and Sarah Rimmer - Linda
- Annie Muscroft - Donna Marie, Mrs Johnston, Ensemble
- Peter Faulkner - Policeman, Cowboy, Ensemble
- David Bingham - Perkins, Neighbour, Ensemble
- Alex Harland - Postman, Ensemble
- Jeremy Backhouse - Ensemble
- Jean Carter - Ensemble
- Keith Murphy - Ensemble

=== Musicians ===
- Rod Edwards - Musical Director, keyboards
- Will Hill - drums
- Bernard Reilly - percussion
- Terry Johnston - guitars
- Nick Payn - saxophones
- Martin Etheridge - trumpet, flugel
- Susanna Furmanek-Halberda - violin

=== Production credits ===
- Jon Miller - producer
- Bill Kenwright - executive producer
- Rod Edwards - arranger
- Del Newman - arranger
- Steve Orchard - remix engineer
- Ben Georgiades - assistant engineer
- Roger T. Wake - mastering engineer
- John Craig - coordinator for First Night Records

== Certifications ==
Region	Certification	Certified units/sales
United Kingdom (BPI)	Gold	100,000^{‡}
^{‡} Sales+streaming figures based on certification alone.
