= Rejects Revenge Theatre Company =

Rejects Revenge Theatre Company was one of the longest running professional touring theatre companies in the United Kingdom, active from 1990 to 2005.

Rejects Revenge was founded in Liverpool in 1990 by Ann Farrar, Tim Hibberd, and David White. Farrar studied English at the University of Liverpool, Hibbard moved from the Isle of Wight to study Medieval and Modern History, and White was a musician from Redditch who had come to Liverpool to seek fame and fortune in the home of the Beatles. Farrar and White met at a community theatre course on Hope Street; Hibberd met Farrar when she joined The Network, an agitprop socialist theatre company based at the Trade Union Centre on Hardman Street. Their training consisted mainly of partaking in the numerous free workshops given by theatre practitioners on Hope Street in the late 1980s and early 1990s, organised by Peter Ward. These companies and individuals (including Trestle, Théâtre de Complicité, Peta Lilly, and the Mime Theatre Project) would usually then perform at Liverpool's Unity Theatre under the directorship of Graeme Phillips.

In 1990, the Everyman Theatre donated its space free for three nights for anyone on the Hope Street course who wished to perform. Farrar asked Hibberd if he wished to create a piece based on the Eastern European revolutions at the time, and Staging the Revolution became the first work they created together. White was introduced into the company later that year. Much of their work began as devised pieces, but unlike many devising companies of the time, they were keen to turn this into a strict performance script with pieces normally written by Hibberd. Their work was often very physical, but the physicality of the words was always given equal weight.

After 15 years of national and international touring, the company fell foul of the 2005 Arts Council funding cuts, and created its final production that year. The company's archive was preserved at the Museum of Liverpool Life.

== Shows ==
- Staging the Revolution (1990)
- Pie in the Sky (1990)
- Boiling Oil and the Bouncing Monks (1991)
- A Rejects Christmas Carol (1992)
- The Wheel (1994)
- Crumble (1994)
- Peasouper (1995)
- Dusty Fruit (1997)
- Whoredom (1999 – joint production with Dog the Monkey)
- The Rejects' Canterbury Tales (2000)
- The Bicycle Bridge (2001)
- Out of the Blue (2005)
- The Steppe Brothers (2005)
- Hoof! (2005–2008 – a co-production with Spike Theatre)
- Here Be Monsters (2008)

== Awards ==
- 1995: Fringe First at the Edinburgh Fringe for Peasouper
- 1995 Spirit of the Fringe Award at the Edinburgh Fringe for Peasouper
- 1997: Fringe First at the Edinburgh Fringe for Dusty Fruit
