= Mary Hewins =

- Born: December 14, 1914; Stratford-upon-Avon
- Died: January 24, 1986 (aged 71); Warwick
- Education: Alcester Road in Stratford
- Known for: subject of biography and play
- Spouse: Fred Bowtell
- Relatives: Angela Hewins (daughter-in-law)

Mary Elizabeth Hewins became Mary Elizabeth Bowtell (14 December 1914 – 24 January 1986) was a British working woman whose oral history was the subject of a history from below biography. The biography was the basis of a play performed by the Royal Shakespeare Company in 1985.

== Life ==
Hewins was born in Stratford-upon-Avon to Emma and George Henry Hewins. Her mother was forceful and her father was a bricklayer who became disabled while serving during the First World War. Her father had a pension for his disabilities but he agreed to relinquish this for a small one-off payment. Her father liked to drink and he took menial jobs. The family were poor but they had two bits of good fortune. Her mother persuaded the council to let them have a council home and the local bishop decided to help the family. He had met her father during his confirmation at Stratford's Church of the Holy Trinity He nominally gave her father the job of a school caretaker, but the proviso was that his wife and family would assist in fulfilling the duties.

Mary had a poor education as she was tired from cleaning her own school where her father was the caretaker and she had poor and undiagnosed eyesight until after she left school. She later reported the amazing transformation when her sight was fixed. This was after she started dirty and poorly paid work polishing aluminium pans in a local factory. She left this work after six months preferring to help wash bottles at Flowers brewery.

Mary became pregnant and her boyfriend was beaten up by her brothers and he left. She took hard and poorly paid jobs during the war, while her mother became the de-facto parent to her child, Brian. In 1948 she married Fred Bowtell who was a bookbinder. Brian worked at Mid-Warwickshire College in Leamington Spa and he volunteered to work with teenagers who were on probation.

Brian married a woman named Angela and she decided to take a degree at Britain's Open University where she became interested in history. Angela Hewins first wrote the biography of Mary's father George and this was published in 1981. The book would later be staged as a play, "The Dillen", in 1984. Angela then decided to co-write Mary's story as "Mary, After the Queen: Memories of a Working Girl" with Paul Thompson which was published in 1985. and this too was transformed into a play in the same year. Peggy Mount played Mary as an older woman as part of a Royal Shakespeare Company production co-written by Angela Hewins and Ron Hutchinson.

Her son Brian decided to find his father and he traced him to Los Angeles where he was working. In time he returned to the UK and ended up living with his son and daughter-in-law before he was given a flat by the local council. Mary and Brian renewed their friendship but Mary was used to being single. She died in 1986 from cancer in Warwick. Her husband died from cirrhosis of the liver in 1992.
