= A Special Kind of Hero =

Single by Stephanie Lawrence
- Released: 1986
- Genre: Theme music
- Songwriter(s): Nik Kershaw

"A Special Kind of Hero" is a song by Stephanie Lawrence that was served as the theme song of Hero (1986 FIFA World Cup Official Film)

The World Cup Greatest Hits album on which this track is allegedly re-released in fact does not contain this song. Somehow there was a mix-up resulting in the Official FIFA Anthem that was first used in the 1994 World Cup replacing it, but still being labeled as Special Kind of Hero. The only source from which the real song can be heard today is Hero - The Official Film of 1986 FIFA World Cup: Hero.

It was written by Rick Wakeman.

== See also ==
- Hero (1987 film)
