= One for the Road (Russell play) =

1980 comedic play by Willy Russell

One For The Road is a comedic play by Willy Russell, written in 1976 and published in 1980. The script was revised and updated by Russell in 1985 and the rights are held by Samuel French Ltd. It is not to be confused with the Harold Pinter play of the same name. It was originally entitled The Tupperware Man (in reference to a comedic speech from Dennis over dinner at the beginning of Act II) and performed under this name until a legal threat from Tupperware. It then became 'Painted Veg And Parkinson'.

The cast of four comprises Dennis Cain, his wife Pauline, later joined by Jane and Roger, and the setting is a bungalow in Castlehills, a fictional new middle-class housing development in the north of England. The cast await the arrival of Dennis' parents, lost in the warren of identical roads and bungalows, whilst discussing the wave of puerile vandalism that has inflicted, it seems mysteriously, all but the Cain's gardens. The 'Parnes Kids' are blamed for gnome decapitations, painted garden vegetables, Radox filled fountains and a Venus de Milo with arms stuck on it – but could the culprit be closer to home? What is in Dennis's Queen Anne bureau?

Off-stage characters are referenced frequently and conversed with; most frequently Dennis's mother and father on the telephone and Val from next door. In the 1985 version, the line 'Mummy, Mummy!' from John, the Cains' young son, is heard towards the end.

The play contains a number of contemporary cultural references including Terry Wogan as a prime time interviewer (Michael Parkinson in the 1980 original script); Russell Harty; Richard Clayderman; Margaret Thatcher's tax policy (1985 version only); The Jewel in the Crown (1985 version only); the 'video nasties' controversy.

Despite not being as well known as Russell's Shirley Valentine, Blood Brothers and Educating Rita, the play has been adapted for television and performed several times over the years, professionally and under amateur licence.
