= Our Day Out (musical) =

- Book cover from Heinemann Plays series 1993
- Music: Willy Russell, Chris Mellor, Bob Eaton
- Book: Willy Russell
- Setting: Liverpool, England, 1970s
- Basis: Our Day Out (teleplay)
- Premiere: 1983: Everyman Theatre, Liverpool
- Productions: 2009: Royal Court Theatre; 2017: Theatre Royal, Bury St Edmunds

Our Day Out is a musical with the book and music written by Willy Russell that premiered in 1983. It is an adaptation of the 1977 TV-movie Our Day Out.

== Origins and development ==
The musical was developed from the 1977 BBC television play "Our Day Out" by Willy Russell. The original television version was developed into a musical for the stage with songs by Willy Russell, Chris Mellor and Bob Eaton. This production, directed by Bob Eaton and Kate Roland, was first performed at the Everyman Theatre, Liverpool in 1983.

In 2009, Russell rewrote the musical and updated to a more modern feeling. It premièred in the Royal Court Theatre, Liverpool in 2010. The updated version was performed outside Liverpool at the Theatre Royal, Bury St Edmunds from 24 Aug - 2 September 2017.

== Overview ==
The musical is about students from an inner-city school in Liverpool who go on a trip to Conwy Castle in Wales. Mrs Kay teaches a class of illiterate pupils, called the "Progress Class". At the very last minute, the disciplinarian Deputy Headteacher, Mr Briggs, also joins.

== Plot ==
A group of pupils in a Progress Class at a secondary school in a deprived part of Liverpool are going on a trip to Conwy Castle, but they misbehave. Before the trip they leave they buy sweets and the deputy head disciplinarian teacher, Mr Briggs, joins them. On the journey, they visit several attractions - a cafe, a zoo, the beach (Conwy Castle) and (afterwards) a fun fair. Whilst the children shoplift and generally make trouble, an older boy, Reilly hits on his young teacher, Susan, who shakes off his attentions by suggesting he turn his attention to the pretty young Linda, who had been trying it on with her own boyfriend, Colin. At the castle, they end up losing one of the children, Carol.

Mr. Briggs finds Carol on the cliffs as she laments the necessity of returning to her troubled home life. He shouts at her to return but when she threatens to jump off the cliff, he softens and gently talks her down. In an uncharacteristic moment, Mr. Briggs takes the children to the fun fair, where Mrs. Kay gently mocks him for enjoying himself, saying she has the photographs to prove he is not all that bad. Briggs offers to develop the photographs for her, but later, after a moments sad reflection, exposes them to the light.

== Analysis ==
The reviewer of the 2010 production wrote: "Russell has the ability to inject, into what is superficially a jolly knees-up, social comment and human understanding. Amid all the comedy and music is a serious view of kids and education that is the same today as yesterday."

The major themes in Our Day Out are the lack of education, lack of opportunity and deprivation in inner city Liverpool equalling unemployment and no money for education because of this. Willy Russell makes this point very clear to the audience by using characters that the level of deprivation is really effecting e.g. Carol- her lack of education is very obviously troubling her as she would like to get a good job, however is not bright enough to do so because of the lack of education.

Characters

- Mrs Helen Kay: Teacher of the Progress Class. (In her early 40s)
- Susan: Helps Mrs Kay look after the children. (Early twenties)
- Colin: Another helper of Mrs Kay; he is teased by Reilly & Digga because he is dating Susan. (Early twenties)
- Mr John Briggs: Deputy Headmaster; he is very strict and tries to discipline the children. (Early thirties)
- The Headmaster: Sends Mr Briggs to supervise the children.
- Ronny Suttcliffe: Driver of the coach who gets tricked by Mrs Kay to teach him a lesson about not to be stingy with the kids background.

Kids

- Carol: First and last character seen in the play. (13)
- Reilly: Class bully. (15)
- Digga: Reilly's 'assistant'. (15)
- Linda: Has a crush on Colin. (15)
- Karen: Linda's friend; has a crush on Colin. (15)
- Andrew: Andrew is addicted to smoking and does not have a very good life at home. His parents too, especially his dad, are addicted to smoking. (13)
- Ronson: A minor character in the play. He is seen in a conversation at the zoo with Mr. Briggs and Andrews. (13)
- Kevin: Another minor character, he is seen in an encounter with Mrs. Kay on the beach. Twelve years old. (12)
- Jimmy: A student from the Progress Class. (12)
- Maurice: The kid who brings the sweets to the coach. (12)

Shopkeepers

- Mrs Roberts: Foresees what might happen to her if she lets the children into her café and forbids them from entering.
- Waitress: Works in Mrs Roberts's café.
- John: Shop owner who gets robbed by the kids.
- Mac: Shop owner who gets robbed by the kids.

Other Adults

- Les: The lollipop man.
- The Animal Keeper: He shouts at the kids for stealing animals from the zoo.

== Musical numbers ==
Act 1

- We're Goin' Out - Carol and kids
- Mrs Kay's Progress Class - Kids
- Got A Packed Lunch - Kids
- Boss Of The Bus - Ronny and Kids
- Instructions On Enjoyment - Mr Briggs
- We're Off - Kids
- Look At The Dogs/Our day out (The travelling song) - Company
- The Mersey Tunnel - Kids
- It's Borin', Bleeding Borin' - Bored Girls
- Straight Line - Mr Briggs and Mrs Kay
- Penny Chews - Kids
- I'm In Love With Sir - Linda, Karen and Kids
- Zoo Song - Bored girls and Kids
- Our Day Out - Kids

Act 2

- Castle Song - Mr Briggs, Kids, Linda, Karen and Colin
- Beach Song (short) - Bored girls and Kids
- I Know You Like Her - Susan
- Why Can't It Always Be This Way (Carol's Song) - Carol
- Fairground Song - Kids
- Everywhere We Go - Kids
- Ay Ay Yippee Yippee Ay - Kids
- We Had A Really Great Day Out - Company
- Finale: No One Can Take This Time Away - Company
