= Educating Rita =

Stage comedy by Willy Russell

- Samuel French acting edition cover
- Original language: English
- Written by: Willy Russell
- Subject: Pygmalion-style drama about a hairdresser's literary quest.
- Genre: Comedy

Premiere
- Date: June 1980
- Place: Donmar Warehouse; London

Educating Rita is a stage comedy by the English playwright Willy Russell. It is a play for two actors set entirely in the office of an Open University tutor.

Commissioned by the Royal Shakespeare Company, Educating Rita premièred at The Warehouse, London, in June 1980 starring Julie Walters and Mark Kingston. The play was directed by Mike Ockrent.

== Plot summary ==
The plays follows the relationship between a 26-year-old Liverpudlian working class hairdresser and Frank, a middle-aged university lecturer, during the course of a year.

Susan (who initially calls herself Rita), dissatisfied with the routine of her work and social life, seeks inner growth by signing up for and attending an Open University course in English Literature. The play opens as 'Rita' meets her tutor, Frank, for the first time. Frank is a middle-aged, alcoholic career academic who has taken on the tutorship to pay for his drink. The two have an immediate and profound effect on one another; Frank is impressed by Susan's verve and earnestness and is forced to re-examine his attitudes and position in life; Susan finds Frank's tutelage opens doors to a bohemian lifestyle and a new self-confidence. However, Frank's bitterness and cynicism return as he notices Susan beginning to adopt the pretensions of the university culture he despises. Susan becomes disillusioned by a friend's attempted suicide and realises that her new social niche is rife with the same dishonesty and superficiality she had previously sought to escape. The play ends as Frank, sent to Australia on a sabbatical, welcomes the possibilities of the change.

== Themes ==
The play deals with the concept of freedom, change, Britain's class system, the shortcomings of institutional education, and the nature of self-development and of personal relationships. The play borrows from the 1913 George Bernard Shaw play Pygmalion, itself based upon archetypes from Greek myth.

== Film adaptation ==
The play was adapted by Russell for a 1983 film with Michael Caine and Julie Walters, directed by Lewis Gilbert.

== Radio adaptation ==
The play was adapted by Russell for radio in 2009. It starred Bill Nighy and Laura Dos Santos directed by Kirsty Williams, and was a 90-minute play broadcast on BBC Radio 4 on Boxing Day 2009.

== Revivals ==
In 1987, Laurie Metcalf starred as Rita in a production Off-Broadway at the Westside Theatre produced by the Steppenwolf Theater Company.

From June to July 2001, the Williamstown Theatre Festival mounted a production of Educating Rita at the Nikos Stage starring Jacqueline McKenzie as Rita and Edward Herrmann as Frank. The production was directed by Bruce Paltrow and was critically acclaimed with critics touting McKenzie's performance as "wonderfully beguiling and irrepressible...one of the best performances of the year".

From 26 March to 8 May 2010, as part of the Willy Russell season at the Menier Chocolate Factory, Laura Dos Santos reprised her radio performance on stage as Rita alongside Larry Lamb as Frank. This was the production's first London West End revival. This production transferred to the Trafalgar Studios in London's West End from 8 July to 30 October 2010, produced by Sonia Friedman. Laura Dos Santos reprised her radio and Menier Chocolate Factory performance as Rita, and Frank was played by renowned actor Tim Pigott-Smith. Like the Willy Russell season at the Menier Chocolate Factory, the production ran in repertory alongside Shirley Valentine starring Meera Syal. A UK tour played in 2012, starring Claire Sweeney and Matthew Kelly as Rita and Frank respectively.

A 35th anniversary production was staged at Liverpool Playhouse from 6 February to 7 March 2015, starring Leanne Best as Rita and Con O'Neill as Frank, directed by Gemma Bodinetz. In June 2015 a production starring Lashana Lynch and Lenny Henry as Rita and Frank, directed by Michael Buffong ran at the Minerva Theatre, Chichester.

A 40th anniversary revival directed by Max Roberts and starring Stephen Tompkinson and Jessica Johnson as Frank and Rita opened in spring 2019, running throughout 2020 (during the COVID-19 pandemic) and 2021.

== Awards and nominations ==
The original production received the 1980 Olivier Award nomination for Comedy Performance of the Year for Julie Walters and won for Comedy of the Year.

== See also ==
- Galatea of Greek mythology
- My Fair Lady
- Pretty Woman
