= Willy Russell =

British dramatist, lyricist and composer

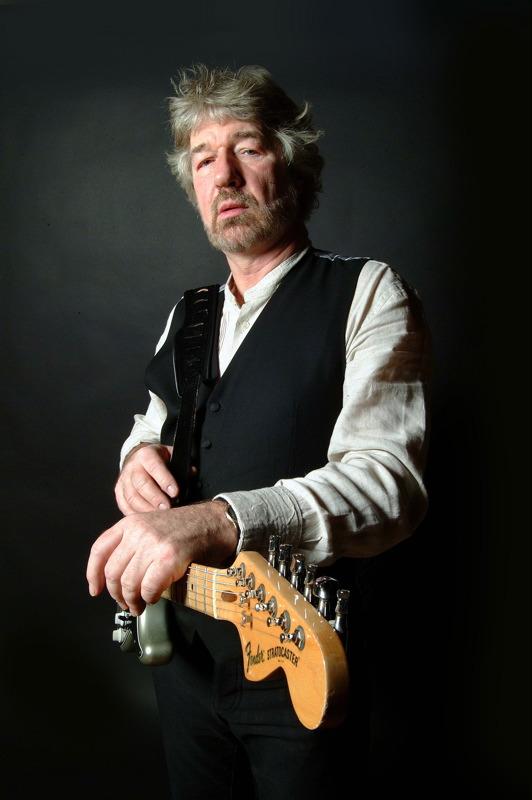
- Russell in 2003
- Born: William Russell; 23 August 1947 (age 79); Whiston, Lancashire, England
- Occupations: Playwright, screenwriter, author, lyricist, composer
- Spouse: Annie Seagroatt (m. 1969)
- Children: 3
- Writing career
- Notable works: Educating Rita; Shirley Valentine; Blood Brothers; Our Day Out
- Website: willyrussell.com

William Russell (born 23 August 1947) is an English dramatist, lyricist and composer. His best known works are Educating Rita, Shirley Valentine, Blood Brothers and Our Day Out.

== Early life ==
Russell was born in Whiston, Lancashire (which is now Merseyside). On leaving school, aged 15, he became a women's hairdresser, eventually running his own salon, until the age of 20 when he decided to go back to college. This led to him qualifying as a teacher. During these years, Russell also worked as a semi-professional singer, writing and performing his own songs in folk clubs.

At college, he began writing drama and, in 1972, took a programme of three one-act plays to the Edinburgh Festival Fringe, where they were seen by writer John McGrath, who recommended Russell to the Liverpool Everyman, which commissioned the adaptation, When The Reds…, Russell's first professional work for theatre.

== Career ==
Russell's first play was Keep Your Eyes Down (1971), written while he trained as a teacher at Saint Katherine's College of Higher Education in Liverpool and performed at the Edinburgh Fringe Festival in 1971.

In 1974 Russell wrote John, Paul, George, Ringo ... and Bert, a musical about the Beatles. Commissioned by the Liverpool Everyman, it ran for a (then) unprecedented eight weeks before transferring to the West End where it ran for over a year, winning the Evening Standard and London Theatre Critics awards for the best musical of 1974. It premiered at the Everyman Theatre, Liverpool, and then transferred to the Lyric Theatre in the West End in 1974.

Alongside further stage works, One for the Road (1976) and Stags and Hens (1978), Russell was a screenwriter with television films, Death of A Young Young Man (1975, BBC1), Daughters of Albion (1979), Our Day Out (1977) and the five-part serial One Summer (1983).

Commissioned by the Royal Shakespeare Company, Educating Rita premiered at the Warehouse, London in 1980 and transferred to the West End Piccadilly Theatre, London in August 1980, and starred Julie Walters and Mark Kingston. Since its premiere and long West End run (the play ran to "at least" June 1982), the play has been translated and produced in almost every part the globe garnering awards both for its author and for many of the actors who have played the roles of Rita and Frank.

Returning to the Liverpool Everyman in 1986, Russell wrote Shirley Valentine which went on to an acclaimed West End run, earning Olivier Awards for both its author (Comedy of the Year) and star Pauline Collins (Actress of the Year in a New Play). The play transferred to New York for a highly successful Broadway run in February 1989 to November 1989, and a Tony Award as Best Actress for Collins.

Both Educating Rita (1983) and Shirley Valentine (1989) became feature films with Michael Caine, Julie Walters and Pauline Collins all receiving Oscar nominations for their respective roles, as did Russell for his Educating Rita screenplay.

Russell's other worldwide theatrical success has been Blood Brothers, "a Liverpudlian folk opera" about a pair of twins separated at birth and brought up in completely different environments. It won the Olivier Award for Best New Musical in 1983. Its 1988 revival had over 10,000 consecutive performances during its 24-year West End run, which ended in November 2012. Simultaneously, there were UK touring and international productions, including a two-year run on Broadway starting in 1993. The Broadway production was nominated for the 1993 Tony Award, Best Musical.

In 1985, Russell co-wrote the song "The Show", the theme for the TV series Connie with series creator Ron Hutchinson. The song was performed by vocalist Rebecca Storm and released as a single by Towerbell Records in June 1985, reaching number 22 on the UK Singles Chart.

Russell (with musical collaborator Bob Eaton) realised a long-held ambition to develop Our Day Out further and after extensive rewriting, and recomposing created Our Day Out – The Musical. This modern musical retelling retains all the characters and plot of the original but with the action brought forward to today with a new score and lyrics to reflect this twenty first century setting. The musical was produced in 2010 at the Royal Court Theatre, Liverpool.

The Wrong Boy, Willy Russell's first novel, was published in 2000. In 2004, Russell returned to his original singer/songwriter roots, releasing his album, Hoovering the Moon on Pure Records. Russell also co-produced the Tim Firth album Harmless Flirting.

In 2013, the Archive and Special Collections department of Liverpool John Moores University established the Willy Russell Archive containing manuscripts, programmes, publicity and media material including newspaper cuttings and press releases, correspondence, legal, financial and administrative documents, records relating to the casting and audition process, audio and film material, and promotional ephemera. The material was produced throughout the course of Russell's career and is a comprehensive representation of his work to date. It also illustrates Russell's collaborative works, both written and musical.

== Personal life ==
In 1969, Russell married Annie Seagroatt; the couple have one son, Rob, and two daughters, Rachel and Ruth.

== Works ==
- Keep Your Eyes Down (play 1972)
- Sam O'Shanker (play 1972, musical 1973)
- John, Paul, George, Ringo ... and Bert (musical 1974)
- Death of a Young Young Man (TV Episode 1975)
- Breezeblock Park (play 1975)
- Our Day Out (play 1977, later adapted for stage musical 2010)
- Blind Scouse
- One for the Road (play 1976)
- I Read the News Today (BBC Schools Radio Play, 1976)
- Stags and Hens (1978 play, filmed in 1990 as Dancin' Thru the Dark)
- Educating Rita (play 1980, film 1983)
- The Boy with the Transistor Radio (1980)
- One Summer (TV series 1983)
- Blood Brothers (musical 1983)
- Connie (TV series, co-wrote theme tune "The Show" 1985)
- Shirley Valentine (play 1986, film 1989)
- Terraces (BBC TV film 1993)
- The Wrong Boy (first novel, 2000)
- Hoovering the Moon (music album, 2003)
- Our Day Out – The Musical (2009/10)

== Awards and nominations ==
Awards

- 1980: Laurence Olivier Award for Best New Comedy – Educating Rita
- 1983: Laurence Olivier Award for Best New Musical – Blood Brothers
- 1988: Laurence Olivier Award for Best New Comedy – Shirley Valentine
- 1990: Evening Standard British Film Award for Best Screenplay – Shirley Valentine

Nominations

- 1984: Academy Award nomination for Best Adapted Screenplay – Educating Rita
- 1984: Golden Globe Award nomination for Best Motion Picture Screenplay – Educating Rita
- 1984: BAFTA nomination for Best Adapted Screenplay – Educating Rita
- 1989 Tony Award for Best Play – Shirley Valentine
- 1990: BAFTA nomination for Best Adapted Screenplay – Shirley Valentine
- 1993: Tony Award for Best Book of a Musical – Blood Brothers
