= Blood Brothers (musical) =

Musical by Willy Russell

- 20th anniversary London poster
- Music: Willy Russell
- Lyrics: Willy Russell
- Book: Willy Russell
- Setting: 1950s–1980s Liverpool, England
- Productions: 1983 Liverpool; 1983 West End; 1984 1st UK tour 1988 West End; 1993 Broadway; 1994 1st US tour Several UK tours International productions
- Awards: Olivier Award for Best New Musical

Blood Brothers is a musical with book, lyrics, and music by Willy Russell and was produced by Bill Kenwright until his death in 2023 and the production was then picked up by Bill Kenwright Limited, a company founded by the late producer. The story is a contemporary nature versus nurture plot, revolving around fraternal twins Mickey and Edward, who were separated at birth, one subsequently being raised in a wealthy family, the other in a poor family. The different environments take the twins to opposite ends of the social spectrum, one becoming a councillor, and the other unemployed and in prison. They both fall in love with the same girl, causing a rift in their friendship. Russell says that his work was based on a one-act play that he read as a child "about two babies switched at birth ... it became the seed for Blood Brothers."

Originally developed as a high school play in Liverpool, Blood Brothers debuted in Liverpool before Russell transferred it to the West End for a short run in 1983. The musical won the Laurence Olivier Award for Best New Musical and went on to a year-long national tour before returning for a revival in the West End in 1988 where it stayed at the Albery Theatre for three years, transferring to the Phoenix Theatre in 1991. The revival ran for more than 24 years in the West End, and played more than 10,000 performances, becoming the third longest-running musical production in West End history. It finally closed in November 2012. The musical has been produced with success on tour, on Broadway and elsewhere, and it has developed a cult following. Blood Brothers is often taught as one of the prescribed plays of GCSE English Literature in English schools.

== Production history ==
=== Original production (Liverpool, West End and UK tour) ===
Willy Russell originally wrote and presented Blood Brothers as a school play first performed at Fazakerley Comprehensive School, Liverpool, in November 1981, in conjunction with Merseyside Young People's Theatre (MYPT; now operating as Fuse: New Theatre For Young People). with Jane Hollowood as Mrs Johnstone, Catherine Hawkes as Mrs Lyons, Michael Strobel as Mickey, Geof Armstrong as Edward and Carrie Club as Linda

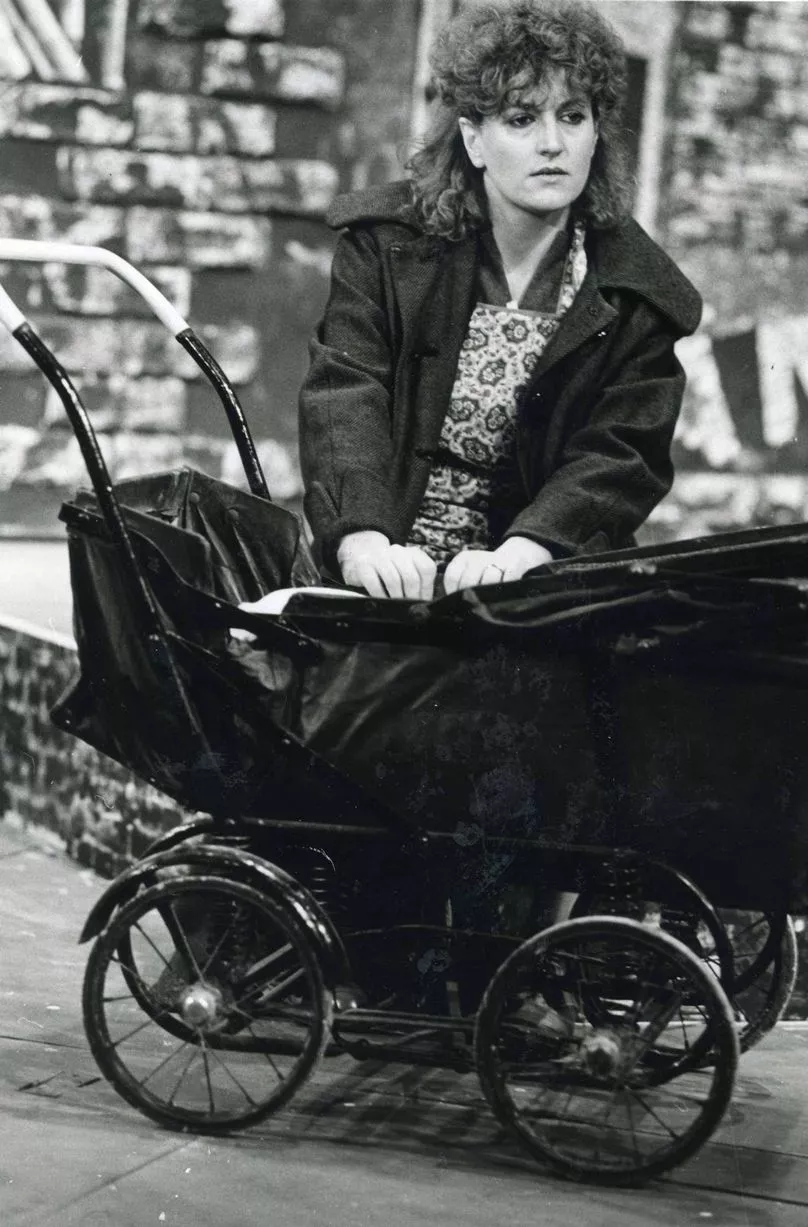
Barbara Dickson in 1983 production of Blood Brothers

He then wrote a score and developed the musical for a production at the Liverpool Playhouse, opening on 8 January 1983, starring Barbara Dickson (Mrs. Johnstone), Andrew Schofield (narrator), George Costigan (Mickey) and Andrew C. Wadsworth (Edward). It was only a modest success. Nevertheless, the show transferred to London's West End on 11 April 1983 at the Lyric Theatre and ran until 22 October 1983. The cast remained substantially the same as that at Liverpool Playhouse with Kate Fitzgerald taking over the role of Linda and, later in the run, Robert McIntosh taking over as the Narrator. It won two Olivier Awards for Best New Musical and Best Actress in a Musical (Barbara Dickson).

This was followed by a 1984 UK tour. starring Rebecca Storm as Mrs Johnston, former boxer John Conteh as Narrator, future Doctor Who Peter Capaldi as Edward and two of the McGann Brothers Mark as Mickey and Joe as Sammy. Willy Russell also stepped into the role of the Narrator for part of the tour.

=== West End (1988–2012) ===
Blood Brothers year-long national tour began in 1986/1987, produced by Bill Kenwright (and directed by Kenwright and Bob Tomson), starring Kiki Dee as Mrs Johnstone, Warwick Evans as the Narrator, Con O'Neill as Mickey and Robert Locke as Edward, leading to a revival at the Albery Theatre (now the Noël Coward Theatre), directed by Tomson, with the same cast. O'Neill won an Olivier Award for his performance, and Dee was nominated. It opened on 28 July 1988 and moved out of that theatre on 16 November 1991.

The musical transferred to the Phoenix Theatre on 21 November 1991, With Stephanie Lawrence as Mrs Johnstone, While at the Phoenix in 1993 the show celebrated 10 years since the original production with Barbara Dickson returning for a limited run, the current productions 10th anniversary with a gala performance on 28 July 1998, featuring Lyn Paul as Mrs Johnstone, Keith Burns (Narrator) Andy Snowden (Mickey) & Mark Hutchinson (Edward), the shows 18th anniversary with Maureen Nolan and Anthony costa as Mrs Johnstone and Mickey, 20th anniversary with Lyn Paul as Mrs Johnstone in 2008 and 21st anniversary with Niki Evans and Melanie C both as Mrs Johnston in 2009

The show closed its West End run on 10 November 2012. Due to close on 27 October, its run was extended by 2 weeks. The closing cast included Lyn Paul as Mrs. Johnstone, Warwick Evans as the Narrator, Sean Jones as Mickey, Mark Hutchinson as Edward, Vivienne Carlyle as Mrs. Lyons, Jan Graveson as Linda, Michael 'Suv' Southern as Sammy, and Kevin Pallister as Mr. Lyons. It played more than 10,000 performances in London, making it the third longest-running musical to ever play in the West End. In 2025 it was overtaken by Mamma Mia, but Blood Brothers remains the longest running West End Revival.

The UK tour continues to present day.

The central role of Mrs. Johnstone has been played in various productions by, among others, Kiki Dee, Angela Richards, Vivian Parry, Barbara Dickson, Stephanie Lawrence, Clodagh Rodgers, Lyn Paul, Siobhan McCarthy, four of the Nolan sisters (Linda, Bernie, Denise and Maureen), Melanie C (making her West End debut and receiving an Olivier nomination in 2009), Marti Webb, Vivienne Carlyle, Niki Evans, Amy Robbins, Natasha Hamilton, Helen Reddy, Rebecca Storm, Carole King and Petula Clark. Stephanie Lawrence played the role more times than anyone else.

Mickey has been played by Con O'Neill, Russell Boulter, Stephen McGann, Paul Crosby, Antony Costa, Russell Crowe, Stefan Dennis, Andy Snowden and David Cassidy among others. Sean Jones has been playing Mickey for over 20 years, and can still be seen in the role in the Spring Tour 2025.

Notable actors to play Edward include Mark Hutchinson and Shaun Cassidy.

Narrators include Warwick Evans, Carl Wayne, Adrian Zmed, David Soul and Marti Pellow.

Alex Harland played the role of the postman in more than 4,000 performances, and has been playing Policeman/Teacher on the UK Tour since 2024.

=== Australia and New Zealand ===
The inaugural Australian production of Blood Brothers premiered August 1988 at the York Theatre in Sydney where it ran for three months: the cast included Chrissy Amphlett as Mrs Johnstone, Bob Baines as the Narrator, Zoe Carides as Linda, Peter Cousens as Edward and Russell Crowe as Mickey.

In 1994 a production of Blood Brothers directed by Bill Kenwright – who had overseen the play in the West End and on Broadway – ran in Melbourne and Sydney in the summer and fall having played dates in Wellington and Auckland NZ that spring: the cast included Delia Hannah as Mrs. Johnstone, David Soul and Warwick Evans once again as the Narrator, Stefan Dennis as Mickey, Ross Girven as Edward, Elaine Smith as Mrs. Lyons, Tina Regtien as Linda, Andrew Laing as Sammy, and David Ashton as Mr. Lyons. David Soul and Stefan Dennis would reprise their roles in London and UK tour in 1995/96.

In 2013 Blood Brothers was produced by the Harvest Rain Theatre Company of Brisbane playing the Cremorne Theatre 3–17 August: directed by Tim O'Connor, the production featured Amanda Muggleton in the role of Mrs. Johnstone. Muggleton had previously played Mrs. Johnstone in the Metcalfe Playhouse (Perth) production of Blood Brothers which ran 11 November – 4 December 2011.

The Chapel Off Chapel venue in Prahran hosted a production of Blood Brothers from 19 March – 6 April 2014: the cast included Chelsea Plumley as Mrs. Johnstone and Peter Hardy and Glenda Linscott as the Lyons.

In 2015 Enda Markey revived Blood Brothers for a 6 February – 15 March engagement at Hayes Theatre Co, reportedly affording the play its first professional production in Sydney since the September 1994 engagement of the play's New Zealand/Australian tour. The play was produced by Enda Markey and directed by Andrew Pole with musical direction by Michael Tyack. The cast included Helen Dallimore as Mrs. Johnstone, Michael Cormick as the Narrator, Bobby Fox as Mickey, Blake Bowden as Edward, Bronwyn Mulcahy as Mrs. Lyons, Christy Sullivan as Linda, Jamie Kristian as Sammy, Matt Edwards as Mr. Lyons. The production went on to play for three weeks at the Alex Theatre, St Kilda, Melbourne, from 14 July 2015, with Josh Piterman taking over the role of Edward.

=== Broadway and US tour ===
The Broadway production opened on 25 April 1993 at the Music Box Theatre and closed on 30 April 1995 after 840 performances. It was co-directed by Tomson and Kenwright. Several of the British actors made their Broadway debuts, including Stephanie Lawrence as Mrs. Johnstone, O'Neill as Mickey, Graveson as Linda, Hutchinson as Edward and Evans as the narrator. Barbara Walsh was Mrs Lyons, and Kerry Butler made her Broadway debut in the ensemble. To boost box office sales during the run, Kenwright persuaded Petula Clark to make her Broadway debut, replacing Lawrence as Mrs. Johnstone, with David Cassidy and Shaun Cassidy as her sons. The casting of the Cassidy half-brothers as the twins generated much publicity. The musical received Tony Award nominations for best musical, best book and best direction, and Lawrence (best actress), O'Neill (best actor) and Graveson (best featured actress) were all nominated for their performances in the original Broadway production. Following Clark's portrayal, Mrs. Johnstone was played by other 1970s pop singers, with King and Reddy later playing the role on Broadway.

Clark and David Cassidy also starred in the US national tour from 1994 to 1995. Clark and the Cassidys also recorded the international cast album, with the musical's playwright, Willy Russell as the Narrator. Many of the cast members were also in the Canadian run, which starred David Cassidy, Michael Burgess and Canadian singer-songwriter Amy Sky.

=== South Africa ===
David Kramer adapted and directed the South African version in 2012, which he set in District Six, a predominantly Coloured inner-city residential area in Cape Town during the Apartheid era, with black cast members. This was the first time that Willy Russell had allowed the musical to be adapted.

=== Czech Republic and Slovakia ===
"Pokrvní bratia" – "Blood Brothers", adapted in the Czech-Slovak language – has been produced several times in the Czech Republic and Slovakia, the inaugural production – adapted into Czech-Slovak by Alexandra Ruppeldtová – premiering in December 1993 at the Nová Scéna Theatre in Bratislava and featuring Soňa Valentová in the role of Johnstonová [i.e. Mrs Johnstone]. "Pokrvní bratia" – newly adapted by Martin Fahrner – premiered at the East Bohemian Theatre in Pardubice in February 2001: a subsequent production of the Fahrner adaptation ran at the Slovácké Theatre in Uherské Hradiště from 1 October 2001 to 7 June 2002 followed by a production (also à la Farhner) at the J. K. Tyl Theatre in Plzeň which ran from 27 September 2003 to 9 June 2004 with Jitka Smutná and Stanislava Fořtová-Topinková alternating in the role of Johnstonová. The premiere Prague engagement of "Pokrvní bratia" – introducing an adaptation by Adam Novák – inaugurated its Palác Blaník run 17 November 2004: this production would feature Daniela Šinkorová and Sisa Sklovská alternating in the role of Johnstonová. "Pokrvní bratia" – as adapted by Fahner – was produced by the Liberec-based F. X. Šalda Theatre whose engagement premiered 23 March 2007: this production would encore in September 2008 as the inaugural production of the Heineken Tower Stage at Tower 115 in Bratislava, where the F. X. Šalda troupe performed "Pokrvní bratia" over three nights. Brno City Theatre revived the Novák adaptation for a production which premiered 2 June 2012 for a 25 performance run during which Hana Holišová and Markéta Sedláčková alternated in the role of Johnstonová. The Ruppeldtová adaptation of "Pokrvní bratia" was produced at the Jonáš Záborský Theatre in Prešov for a fifteen performance run premiering 21 September 2012 over which Svetlana Janišová played the role of Johnstonová. The Nová Scéna Theatre staged a revival of the Ruppeldtová adaptation of "Pokrvní bratia" with an 18 September 2015 premiere at the Nová Scéna Theatre with occasional performances til the end of October, with an announced encore run scheduled to premiere 22 March 2017: Jana Lieskovská and Miroslava Partlová, who alternated in the role of Johnstonová in the 2015 Nová Scéna revival, are scheduled to reprise the role in the 2017 Nová Scéna encore production.

=== Other international productions ===
In addition to the above, the musical has also been produced in various theatres in Europe, Argentina, Mexico, Japan, Korea, Israel, and Canada. The Youth Action Theatre presented the musical in the USSR at Kyiv's Palace of Culture in May 1989.

== Plot ==
=== Act One ===
The play opens in the early 1980s, at the ending of the story. Mrs. Johnstone, surrounded by others, including Mr. and Mrs. Lyons, and the Narrator, is standing over the bodies of Mickey and Edward and sings "Tell Me It's Not True" ("Overture"). The Narrator introduces the "story of the Johnstone twins" to the audience and the play then flashes back to the late 1950s.

30-year old Mrs. Johnstone lives in the Victorian inner-city slums of Liverpool. She describes her whirlwind romance with her husband, who, once attracted to her because of how she looked "like Marilyn Monroe", lost interest in her after multiple pregnancies and weight gain, and eventually left her for a younger, more attractive woman. Now a single mother, she discovers she's pregnant yet again ("Marilyn Monroe").

Heavily in debt and unable to support her seven children alone, Mrs. Johnstone takes a job as a cleaner for a local upper-middle-class couple, Richard and Jennifer Lyons. While talking with Mrs. Lyons, she mentions she's found out she's carrying twins, but can only afford to raise one more child. Mrs. Lyons, desperate for a baby but unable to conceive, suggests she give one of the babies to her ("My Child"). Mrs. Johnstone reluctantly agrees and is made to swear on the Bible to keep to the deal.

Mrs. Johnstone has the twins, and names the two children Michael (known as Mickey throughout the play) and Edward, but then regrets having agreed to give one away ("Easy Terms"). After keeping her deal with Mrs. Lyons, she returns home with baby Michael and lies to her older children, saying that the other baby died.

Mrs. Johnstone continues to work for the Lyons family, but Mrs. Lyons begins to feel she's too attached to Edward. She fires her, causing Mrs. Johnstone to demand her son back. Mrs. Lyons manipulates her into backing down by playing on her superstitious nature, telling her that "if twins separated at birth learn that they were once one of a pair, they will both immediately die" ("Shoes Upon the Table").

Years later, a seven-year-old Mickey meets Edward by chance. After learning that they share the same birthday, the two boys make a pact to become blood brothers, with Mickey nicknaming Edward "Eddie". Mrs. Johnstone finds them and sends Edward away, fearing they will find out they're twins. Later in the day, Mickey goes to Edward's house, but Mrs. Lyons throws him out when she realises that he's Edward's twin.

Mickey plays with some neighbourhood children, including his friend Linda ("Kids' Game"). Afterwards, Mickey takes her to see Edward, and the three of them sneak off to play. Mrs. Lyons worries about Edward's whereabouts ("Gypsies in the Wood"). The three are caught attempting to throw stones through a window by a police officer, and escorted home.

Mrs. Lyons, worried about Edward's friendship with Mickey, persuades her husband they should move. Edward goes to Mrs. Johnstone's house to say goodbye to Mickey and she gives him a locket, which she claims contains a picture of herself and Mickey. Edward asks Mrs. Johnstone why she does not simply move away, causing her to dream about the seemingly impossible possibility of her moving away and beginning a new life ("Bright New Day (Preview)"). Mickey goes to visit Edward but finds him gone ("Long Sunday Afternoon"/"My Friend").

During the early 1970s, the Johnstone family are moved from the condemned inner-city slums of Liverpool to a new council house in the nearby overspill town of Skelmersdale ("Bright New Day").

=== Act Two ===
Act Two rejoins the twins when they are 14 years old, some time in the early-to-mid 1970s. The Johnstone family are enjoying a better life now they have moved to a new home and a new area, and they have not seen Edward in all this time ("Marilyn Monroe 2"). Mickey has now developed a crush on Linda, who is obviously interested in him too, but Mickey does not know how to approach her and is embarrassed by her honesty to being attracted to him. During their journey to school Sammy, Mickey's older brother, pretends to be 14 to get a cheaper bus ticket. When he is confronted his violent nature becomes obvious; he swears violently at the driver, threatens him with a knife, steals some money and escapes.

Edward is suspended from his boarding school for refusing to give up his locket to a teacher. Meanwhile, Mickey refuses to pay attention or co-operate during a class in his school, insulting the teacher, and is suspended. Linda is also suspended for defending him. When he returns home, Edward refuses to tell Mrs. Lyons about the locket's contents, and when she takes it and sees the picture inside she panics, and immediately assumes it is a picture of Edward. She grows paranoid, having once thought she had buried the past by moving away, and questions Mrs. Johnstone's presence in their lives ("Secrets"). Edward and Mickey, now teenage and insecure, both reminisce over their blood brother status, and after seeing each other but not realising they are seeing their blood brother, think about how they wish they had the qualities the other guy has ("That Guy"). After Mickey and Linda walk through a field in the countryside surrounding Skelmersdale, where Linda expresses her frustration at how Mickey has not yet asked her out, Mickey and Edward meet by chance once again, discovering that they live near each other after both having moved from Liverpool. Edward gives Mickey humorously inexperienced advice on how to talk to Linda, and invites him to watch a pornographic film with him to "see how it's done".

An increasingly mentally deranged and paranoid Mrs. Lyons further questions whether she is truly free from Mrs. Johnstone ("Shoes Upon The Table (Reprise)") as Mickey asks his mother for money to see a film while reintroducing Edward. After she realises it is a pornographic film, the three have a humorous moment, before Mrs. Johnstone gives them the money and they leave. Mrs Lyons, by this point clearly mentally ill, discovers Mrs. Johnstone's house and confronts her, believing that she followed her after they moved. After she admits that she "never made him [Edward] mine", she offers to pay off Mrs. Johnstone again. After Mrs. Johnstone stands her ground and declares she will not be paid off again, stating that she has made a good life for herself, an enraged Mrs. Lyons attempts to attack Mrs. Johnstone with a knife, but a now strong-willed Mrs. Johnstone fights back and kicks her out, with Mrs. Lyons fleeing in terror. Mrs. Lyons continues to deteriorate into insanity and it is implied that she has developed a reputation for madness. ("Mad Woman On A Hill").

Mickey, Edward, and Linda spend each summer as teens together, taking the play to the end of the 1970s, when an 18-year-old Edward reveals to Linda that he is leaving for university in Liverpool the following day, but has not told her or Mickey. Linda reveals that Mickey still has not asked her out, prompting Edward to tell her what he would say to her if he were Mickey. Secretly, he is revealing his true feelings but has not acted on them out of respect for Mickey ("I'm Not Saying A Word"). Edward leaves for university in Liverpool, but not before encouraging Mickey to ask Linda out.

During Edward's absence, Linda gets pregnant, and she and Mickey quickly marry and move in with Mrs Johnstone. Mickey is then made redundant from his factory job due to the recession of the early 1980s, which hits Merseyside particularly hard, and Mickey joins thousands of other Merseysiders on the dole shortly before Christmas ("Miss Jones"). Edward returns at Christmas ready to party and have fun, but Mickey realises that they are now very different; after a small argument, they part. Mickey is persuaded to assist his brother Sammy, who now engages in criminal acts, in a robbery, to earn money to support Linda and their baby daughter Sarah. The robbery goes bad, and Mickey becomes an accessory to a murder committed by Sammy. He is sentenced to seven years in prison, and the incident destroys Mickey mentally.

In prison, Mickey is diagnosed as chronically depressed. When released early for good behaviour, he is still dependent on anti-depressants. He becomes withdrawn and turns away from Linda ("Marilyn Monroe 3"). Linda, unable to get Mickey off the anti-depressants, contacts Edward, who is now a local councillor, who gets them their own house in Liverpool and Mickey a job ("Light Romance"), taking the focus of the play back to Liverpool. Linda worries about Mickey and continues to meet up with Edward. A mentally ill Mrs. Lyons, now seemingly wanting to get back at Mrs. Johnstone in any way possible, even if it involves possibly being harmful to Edward, sees Edward and Linda together and tells Mickey about it, suggesting that the two are having an affair. Distraught over Edward and Linda's 'affair,' Mickey grabs the gun that Sammy hid before he got arrested and storms down to the council offices to confront Edward ("Madman"), who is giving a speech as Mickey storms in with the gun. Mickey asks why Edward would take away the one good thing that Mickey had – Linda. Edward denies this intention, and the police enter, demanding that Mickey put the gun down. After being informed by Linda of the incident, Mrs. Johnstone runs in and, in an attempt to stop Mickey from shooting Edward, tells the two brothers the truth. Mickey furiously despairs that he was not the one given away, because then he could have had the life given to Edward. Enraged, Mickey gestures with the gun toward Edward and accidentally pulls the trigger. The gun fires, killing Edward, with the police then shooting and killing Mickey.

As Mrs. Lyons had suggested all those years earlier, the superstition that the two brothers would die if they discovered the truth has finally materialised, and the narrator questions whether the differing backgrounds of the two boys was more to blame than superstition. ("Tell Me It's Not True").

=== Alternative ending ===
In another version, Mickey has a fake gun. Mrs. Johnstone rushes to stop him and reveals the truth, which provokes Mrs. Lyons to attempt to shoot Mickey in order to keep her own child. Edward jumps in and takes the bullet, and Mrs. Lyons shoots Mickey in rage. This version ends with the narrator's monologue. This alternative ending is very rare nowadays – only used for the play.

== Characters and cast members ==
=== Original casts ===
| Characters | Liverpool | West End | First UK tour | West End | Broadway | First US tour |
| Characters | 1983 | | 1984 | 1988 | 1993 | 1994 |
|---|---|---|---|---|---|---|
| Mrs. Johnstone | Barbara Dickson | Barbara Dickson | Rebecca Storm | Kiki Dee | Stephanie Lawrence | Petula Clark |
| Narrator | Andrew Schofield | Andrew Schofield | John Conteh | Warwick Evans | Warwick Evans | Mark McGrath |
| Mickey | George Costigan | George Costigan | Mark McGann | Con O'Neill | Con O'Neill | David Cassidy |
| Edward | Andrew C. Wadsworth | Andrew C. Wadsworth | Peter Capaldi | Robert Locke | Mark Michael Hutchinson | Tif Luckenbill |
| Mrs. Lyons | Wendy Murray | Wendy Murray | Liz Brailsford | Joanne Zorian | Barbara Walsh | Priscilla Quinby |
| Linda | Amanda York | Kate Fitzgerald | Judy Holt | Annette Ekblom | Jan Graveson | Yvette Lawrence |
| Sammy | Peter Christian | Peter Christian | Joe McGann | Terry Melia | James Clow | John Kozeluh |
| Mr. Lyons | Alan Leith | Alan Leith | Phillip Manikum | Jeffrey Gear | Ivar Brogger | Walter Hudson |

=== Mrs Johnstone ===
| Original production | Barbara Dickson | Eithne Browne | Rebecca Storm | |
| Bill Kenwright production UK tour and West End | Kiki Dee | Angela Richards | Vivian Parry | Helen Hobson |
| Bill Kenwright production UK tour and West End | Stephanie Lawrence | Barbara Dickson | Siobhan Mcarthy | Clodagh Rodgers |
| Bill Kenwright production UK tour and West End | Lyn Paul | Rose Marie | Rebecca Storms | Marti Webb |
| Bill Kenwright production UK tour and West End | Bernie Nolan | Denise Nolan | Linda Nolan | Maureen Nolan |
| Bill Kenwright production UK tour and West End | Niki Evans | Melanie C | Natasha Hamilton | Amy Robbins |
| Bill Kenwright production UK tour and West End | Linzi Hately | Vivienne Carlyle | Paula Tappenden(Alt) | Sarah Jane Buckley (Alt) |
| Bill Kenwright productions Australia/NZ, Broadway, Toronto | Delia Hannah | Stephanie Lawrence | Petula Clark | Carole King |
| Bill Kenwright productions Australia/NZ, Broadway, Toronto | Helen Reddy | Amy Sky | Regina O'Malley | |

- Barbara Dickson who originated the role in 1983 Liverpool and London has returned three times – in London in 1993, in Liverpool 2000/01 and again in Liverpool in 2004/05.
- Rebecca Storm who originated the role in 1984 UK Tour have returned over 10 times(usually in Ireland) over the 40-year period – the last time being in Dublin in 2026.
- Petula Clark, after completing her run on Broadway she stayed with the show to complete a U.S. tour in 1994 and 1995.
- Helen Hobson started as Mrs Lyons in London and eventually became Mrs Johnstone – returning numerous times, the last being in London in 2007 and being asked to Join the UK tour for Manchester September 2007 when Linda Nolan had to leave due to ill health. Siobhan Mcarthy also returned in 2006/07 to London.
- Linda Nolan and Stephanie Lawrence are probably the two actresses to play the role of Mrs Johnstone the most, both almost 10 years each.
- Amy Robbins played the part in London and got asked to return to the UK tour as emergency cover for three weeks while Lyn Paul had to take time off – Robbins returned to the show 10 years after she had left the London production.
- Niki Evans and Vivienne Carlyle have both played the part in London and UK tour previously and both returned, Niki Evans to UK tour 2022–2024, and Vivienne Carlyle returned to UK tour 2024–2025.
- Lyn Paul was named as Bill Kenwright's favourite Mrs Johnstone (at the final London performance during his speech). She has returned to it constantly whether for full tour/London run or as special guest performer for Liverpool. in 2019 she announced her retirement from the show doing one last 'farewell tour'. She left the show at the end of 2021.

=== The Narrator ===
| Original production | Andrew Schofield | Robert McIntosh | John Conteh | Willy Russell |
| Bill Kenwright production UK tour and West End | Warwick Evans | Paul Keown | Carl Wayne | Keith Burns |
| Bill Kenwright production UK tour and West End | David Soul | Mark Jeffries | Richar Barnes | Phillip Stewart |
| Bill Kenwright production UK tour and West End | Marti Pellow | Craig Price | Steven Houghton | Mike Dyer |
| Bill Kenwright production UK tour and West End | Scott Anson | Jonathan D.Ellis | Michael Mckell | John Payton |
| Bill Kenwright production UK tour and West End | Adam Watkiss | Robbie Scotcher | Dean Chisnall | Kristoffer Harding |
| Bill Kenwright production UK tour and West End | Sean Keany | Richard Munday | Danny Whitehead | David Hitchen (Cover – multiple) |
| Bill Kenwright production Australia/NZ, Broadway, Toronto | Warwick Evans | David Soul | Richard Cox | Adrian Zmed |
| Bill Kenwright production Australia/NZ, Broadway, Toronto | Michael Burgess | Mark McGrath | | |

- Warwick Evans has done every Bill Kenwright production of Blood Brothers except U.S. Tour.
- Scott Anson first did the 1999 UK Tour and returned for the 2024 UK Tour.
- Richard Munday started as 'Neighbour' went on to play 'Mickey' in London and returned as Narrator on UK Tour in 2022–2023.

=== Notable replacements ===
Sean Jones has played 'Mickey Johnstone' numerous times on both the UK tours and in London's West End. As of October 2026 he is still playing the role on the current UK tour.

Singer Niki Evans has played Mrs. Johnstone in the 2023 UK tour, and at the centenary celebrations of the Liverpool Empire Theatre from 11 to 22 March 2025.

In 2012, Melanie C of the Spice Girls played Mrs. Johnstone in the West End production.

When Blood Brothers tours Ireland the lead role of Mrs Johnstone is usually played by Rebecca Storm.

=== Characters ===
- The Narrator, who throughout the play breaks the fourth wall to help the story progress and act as a moral compass.
- Mrs Johnstone, the Lyons' cleaner who single-handedly supports her seven (later eight) children.
- Mrs Jennifer Lyons, the employer of Mrs Johnstone. Mrs Lyons convinces Mrs Johnstone to give her one of her twin sons to raise as her own.
- Edward 'Eddie' Lyons, Mickey's twin brother who was given away by Mrs Johnstone, and brought up by Mrs Lyons; he becomes blood brothers with Mickey (his actual brother).
- Michael 'Mickey' Johnstone, the youngest Johnstone child who is kept by his mother; he becomes blood brothers with Edward (his actual brother).
- Sammy Johnstone, the elder brother of Mickey, who fell out of a window as a child resulting in having a metal plate in his head and commits many crimes
- Linda, a childhood friend of Mickey and Edward and later Mickey's wife.
- Mr Richard Lyons, Mrs Lyons's husband, who is unaware of Edward's true parentage.
- Miss Jones, Mr Lyons's secretary, who, after initially firing all of the workers, is fired from the firm herself as a result of the 1970s recession.
- Donna Marie Johnstone, one of the elder Johnstone children, who was looking after Sammy when they were little and he fell out of a window; by Act II, she is married with three children.
- Darren Wayne Johnstone, the eldest Johnstone child.

== Musical numbers ==
Act I

- "Overture" – Orchestra, Company and Narrator
- "Marilyn Monroe" – Mrs. Johnstone and Full Company
- "Marilyn Monroe" (Reprise) – Mrs. Johnstone
- "My Child" – Mrs. Johnstone and Mrs. Lyons
- "Easy Terms" – Mrs. Johnstone
- "Shoes Upon the Table" – Narrator
- "Easy Terms" (Reprise) – Mrs. Johnstone
- "Kids' Game" – Linda, Mickey and Ensemble
- "Gypsies in the Wood" – Narrator
- "Bright New Day" (Preview) – Mrs. Johnstone
- "Long Sunday Afternoon"/"My Friend" – Mickey and Edward
- "Bright New Day" – Mrs. Johnstone and Full Company

Act II

- "Entr'acte" – Orchestral piece
- "Marilyn Monroe 2" – Mrs. Johnstone and Full Company
- "Secrets" – Narrator
- "That Guy" – Mickey and Edward
- "Shoes Upon the Table" (Reprise) – Narrator
- "I'm Not Saying a Word" – Edward
- "Miss Jones" – Mr Lyons, Miss Jones and Full Company
- "Marilyn Monroe 3" – Mrs. Johnstone
- "Light Romance" – Mrs. Johnstone
- "Madman" – Narrator
- "Tell Me It's Not True" – Mrs. Johnstone and Full Company

== Recordings ==
- 1983 Original London Cast Recording
- 1985 Rebecca Storm sings Blood Brothers – 6 track mini album
- 1988 London Cast Recording
- Geboren Vrienden – 1989 Dutch Cast
- 1989 Israeli Cast
- 1992 Japanese Cast
- 1994 New Zealand Cast Recording – Later repackaged as original Australian Cast Recording
- 1995 London Cast Recording
- 1995 International Cast Recording
- Germans de sang – 1995 Original Barcelona Cast
- 1998 Dutch Cast
- Pokrevní Bratři – 2002 Original Czech Cast
- 뮤지컬 의형제 – 2004 Korean cast
- 2013 The Theatreland Chorus

== Awards and nominations ==
=== Original London production ===
| Year | Award Ceremony | Category | Nominee | Result |
|---|---|---|---|---|
| 1983 | Laurence Olivier Award | Best New Musical | | Won |
| 1983 | Laurence Olivier Award | Best Actress in a Musical | Barbara Dickson | Won |

=== 1988 London revival ===
| Year | Award Ceremony | Category | Nominee | Result |
|---|---|---|---|---|
| 1988 | Laurence Olivier Award | Best Actor in a Musical | Con O'Neill | Won |
| 1988 | Laurence Olivier Award | Best Actress in a Musical | Kiki Dee | Nominated |
| 2010 | Laurence Olivier Award | Best Actress in a Musical | Melanie C | Nominated |

=== Original Broadway production ===
| Year | Award Ceremony | Category | Nominee | Result |
|---|---|---|---|---|
| 1993 | Drama Desk Award | Outstanding Actor in a Musical | Con O'Neill | Nominated |
| 1993 | Drama Desk Award | Outstanding Featured Actor in a Musical | Mark Michael Hutchinson | Won |
| 1993 | Tony Award | Best Musical | | Nominated |
| 1993 | Tony Award | Best Book of a Musical | Willy Russell | Nominated |
| 1993 | Tony Award | Best Performance by a Leading Actor in a Musical | Con O'Neill | Nominated |
| 1993 | Tony Award | Best Performance by a Leading Actress in a Musical | Stephanie Lawrence | Nominated |
| 1993 | Tony Award | Best Performance by a Featured Actress in a Musical | Jan Graveson | Nominated |
| 1993 | Tony Award | Best Direction of a Musical | Bill Kenwright and Bob Tomson | Nominated |

== See also ==
- Long-running musical theatre productions
