= Ron Hutchinson (screenwriter) =

Northern Irish screenwriter, playwright, and author

- Born: 8 November 1946 (age 79); Lisburn, Northern Ireland
- Occupations: Screenwriter; Playwright; Author
- Years active: 1977–present

Ron Hutchinson (born 8 November 1946) is a Northern Irish screenwriter, playwright, and author. He is a four-time Primetime Emmy Award nominee, winning once for writing the screenplay for the television film Murderers Among Us: The Simon Wiesenthal Story (1989).

== Career ==
Among his other productions were Slave of Dreams (directed by Robert M. Young), the play Moonlight and Magnolias, and the 2004 miniseries Traffic.

He has written extensively for theatre. In 2004, Hutchinson wrote Moonlight and Magnolias. The play at the Goodman Theatre in Chicago, Illinois was nominated for the 2004 Joseph Jefferson Award for New Work. The Irish Play was performed in a Royal Shakespeare Company production at the Royal Shakespeare Company Warehouse Theatre in London, England with Ron Cook, Brenda Fricker, and P.G. Stephens in the cast. Barry Kyle was the director. Writing in Variety in 2005, David Rooney found the Manhattan Theatre Club's production of Moonlight and Magnolias to be a "flimsy comedy", but that "despite its superficial exploration of anti-Semitism in 1939 Hollywood, the play is not without its pleasures". Reviewing the Tricycle Theatre's production of the play for The Daily Telegraph two years later, Charles Spencer called it a "delightful screwball comedy that is also a valentine to the golden days of Hollywood. A prolific screenwriter himself, who knows what it is to be holed up in a hotel room at two in the morning with a script to a doctor for the following day's shoot, Hutchinson has come up with a comedy of panache that's certainly worth giving a damn about."

In April 2019, BBC Radio 4 broadcast Hutchinson's Ship of Lies, a five-part drama based on some of the legends and myths regarding RMS Titanic.

== Personal life ==
Hutchinson was brought up and educated in Coventry. He now lives in Los Angeles, California with his second wife and adopted daughter.

== Filmography ==
- Second City Firsts
  - Twelve Off the Belt (1977) (writer)
- Play for Today
  - The Last Window Cleaner (1979) (writer)
  - The Out of Town Boys (1979) (writer)
- ITV Playhouse
  - The Winkler (1979) (writer)
- Premiere
  - Deasey (1979) (writer)
- Bull Week
  - Saturday (1980) (writer)
  - Friday (1980) (writer)
  - Thursday (1980) (writer)
  - Wednesday (1980) (writer)
  - Tuesday (1980) (writer)
- Bird of Prey (1982) and Bird of Prey 2 (1984) (creator and writer)
- Connie (TV series) (1985)
- Window, Sir? (1986) (writer)
- Unnatural Causes (TV series) (1986)
- The Marksman (TV mini-series) (1987)
- Rat in the Skull (TV movie) (1987) (based upon his play)
- Dead Man Out (TV movie) (teleplay) (1989)
- Murderers Among Us: The Simon Wiesenthal Story (TV movie) (written by) (1989)
- Perfect Witness (TV movie) (written by) (1989)
- Red King, White Knight (written by) (1989)
- Prisoner of Honor (1991)
- The Josephine Baker Story (story / teleplay) (1991)
- Blue Ice (1992)
- The Burning Season (1994)
- Against The Wall (1994)
- Fatherland (teleplay) (1994)
- Slave of Dreams (1995)
- The Tuskegee Airmen (teleplay) (1995)
- The Island of Dr. Moreau (1996)
- Traffic (2004) (also Executive producer)
- The Ten Commandments (2006)
- Marco Polo (written by) (2007)
- The Devil's Teardrop (adaptation) (2010) (also Executive producer)

== Plays ==
- Says I, Says He (1977)
- Eejits (1978)
- The Irish Play (1980)
- Risky City (1981)
- Into Europe (1981)
- The Dillen (1983)
- Rat In The Skull (1984)
- Mary, After The Queen (1985)
- Flight (1988)
- Pygmies In The Ruins (1991)
- Burning Issues 2000)
- Lags (2001)
- Beau Brummell (2001)
- Head/Case (2004)
- Moonlight and Magnolias (2004)
- Topless Mum In Dead Hero Shocker!! (2007)
- Durand's Line (2009)
- Paisley & Me (2012)
- Dead On Her Feet (2012)
