= Shirley Valentine =

1986 play

- Original language: English
- Written by: Willy Russell
- Subject: A holiday in Greece refreshes an unhappy middle-aged Liverpool housewife in more ways than one
- Genre: Comedy; Monodrama

Premiere
- Date: 1986
- Place: Everyman Theatre; Liverpool

Shirley Valentine is a one-character play by Willy Russell. Taking the form of a monologue by a middle-aged, working class Liverpool housewife, it focuses on her life before and after a transforming holiday abroad.

== Plot ==
Wondering what has happened to her youth and feeling stagnant and in a rut, Shirley feels as if her family treats her more like a servant and she finds herself regularly alone and talking to the wall while preparing an evening meal of "chips and egg" for her emotionally distant husband. When her best friend wins a competition for two to Greece, she packs her bags, leaves a note on the cupboard door in the kitchen, and heads for a fortnight of rest and relaxation. In Greece, with just a little effort on her part, she rediscovers everything she had been missing about her existence in England. She finds so much happiness, in fact, that when the vacation is over she decides not to return, ditching her friend at the airport and going back to the hotel where she'd been staying to ask for a job and to live a newly self-confident life in which she is at last true to herself.

== Productions ==
Commissioned by the Everyman Theatre in Liverpool, the play premiered in 1986, with Noreen Kershaw directed by Glen Walford. At one point during the run Kershaw suffered from appendicitis. With no understudy, Russell himself played Shirley for three weeks. Two years later it opened in London's West End at the Vaudeville Theatre, with Pauline Collins directed by Simon Callow. After eight previews, the Broadway production, with Collins again directed by Callow, opened on 16 February 1989 at the Booth Theatre, where it ran for 324 performances. Ellen Burstyn replaced Collins later in the run, and Loretta Swit starred in a US national tour in 1995. Pamela Power (who played Martina in the BBC sitcom Bread (TV series)) played Shirley in a February 1992 run directed by Richard Olivier at Key Theatre in Peterborough.

From 26 March - 8 May 2010, as part of the Willy Russell season at the Menier Chocolate Factory, Meera Syal played Shirley in the production's first London West End revival. A West End transfer of the Menier Chocolate Factory production ran at the Trafalgar Studios from 20 July – 30 October 2010. Meera Syal reprised her role as Shirley; this production was adapted and broadcast by BBC Radio Four in 2010 and 2017.

A 30th Anniversary Tour, starring Jodie Prenger ran in the UK from March 2017 to November 2017. Prenger was met with rave reviews.

A resetting of the play to Accrington, Lancashire with Willy Russell's permission was reset and performed by Mina Anwar at Bolton Library in 2020 directed by Lotte Wakeham. This sell out show will be revived at Bolton Octagon, The Duke's Theatre Lancaster and The Grand Theatre Blackpool from February 2025.

A new production starring Sheridan Smith, and directed by Matthew Dunster opened at the Duke of York's Theatre, London, in February 2023 and ran until 3 June 2023.

In March 2025, the play returned to the Everyman Theatre, Liverpool as part of the theatre's 60th birthday celebrations with Helen Carter playing Shirley and directed by Stephen Fletcher. The production received rave reviews, many of the performances completely sold out and the run was subsequently extended by a week.

== Awards and nominations ==
Awards

- 1988 Laurence Olivier Award for Best New Comedy
- 1988 Laurence Olivier Award for Best Actress
- 1989 Drama Desk Award for Outstanding Actress in a Play
- 1989 Outer Critics Circle Award for Best Actress
- 1989 Tony Award for Best Performance by a Leading Actress in a Play
- 1989 Theatre World Award for Outstanding Broadway Debut

Nominations

- 1989 Drama Desk Award for Outstanding New Play
- 1989 Drama Desk Award for Outstanding Director of a Play
- 1989 Tony Award for Best Play

== Film adaptation ==
Russell adapted his play for a 1989 film version, directed by Lewis Gilbert, with Collins again playing the title role.

== See also ==
- How Stella Got Her Groove Back
