= Everyman Theatre, Liverpool =

Theatre and building in Liverpool, Merseyside, England

Everyman Theatre
- Liverpool Everyman
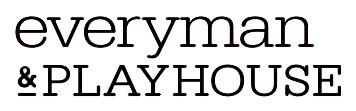

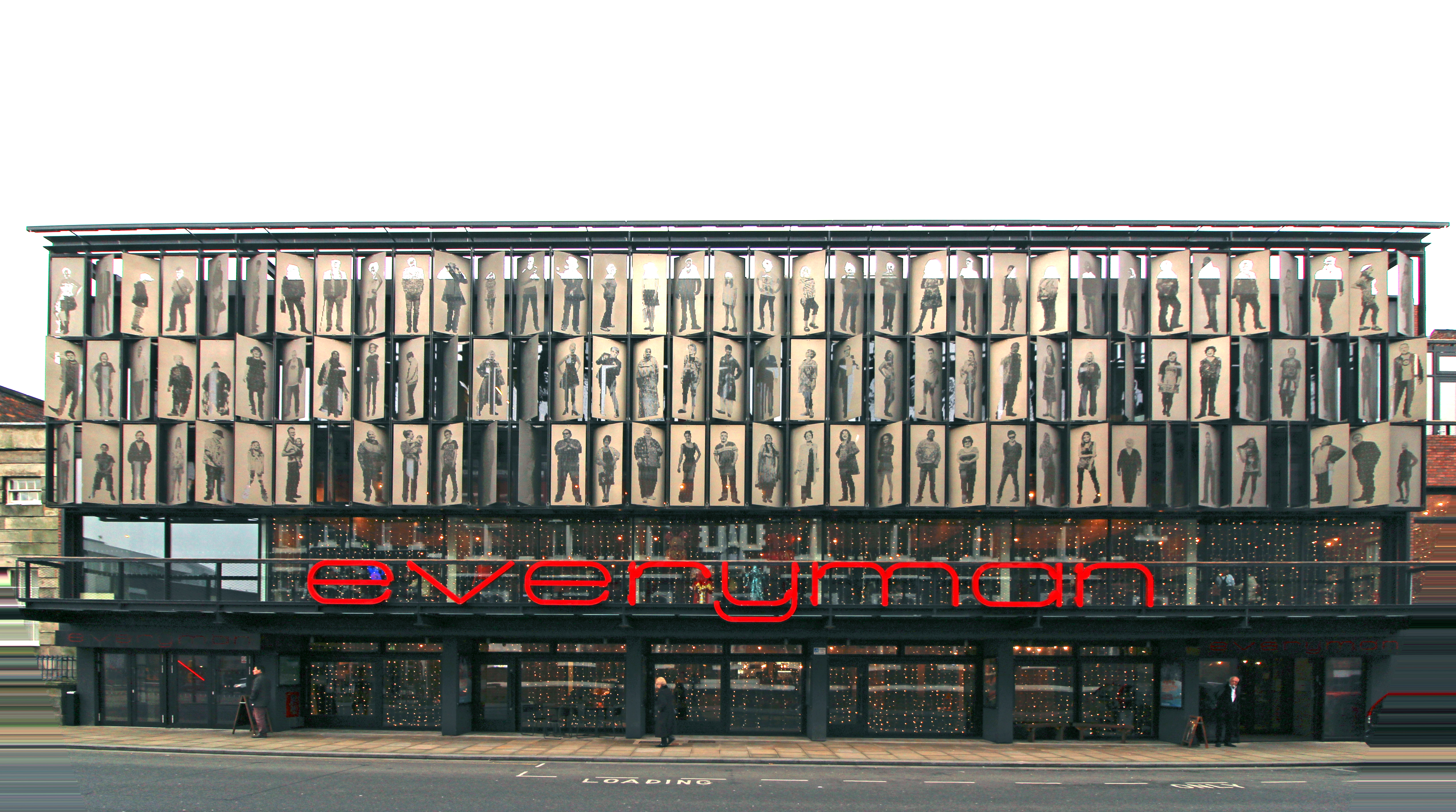
- Everyman Facade
- Interactive map of Everyman Theatre
- Address: 5–11 Hope Street
- Location: Liverpool, England
- Coordinates: 53.403094°N 2.969395°W
- Owner: Liverpool Merseyside Theatres Trust (LMTT)
- Capacity: 400
- Type: Theatre, Bar, Restaurant, Café
- Designation: 2014 RIBA Stirling Prize Winner
- Current use: Theatre

Construction
- Opened: 1964; 62 years ago
- Rebuilt: 2011–2014
- Years active: 1964 – present
- Architect: Haworth Tompkins (2014)

Website
- everymanplayhouse.com

The Everyman Theatre stands at the north end of Hope Street in Liverpool, Merseyside, England. It was founded in 1964, in Hope Hall (once a chapel, then a cinema), in an area of Liverpool noted for its bohemian environment and political edge, and quickly built a reputation for ground-breaking work. The Everyman was completely rebuilt between 2011 and 2014.

== History ==
The building was constructed as Hope Hall, a dissenters' chapel built in 1837. In 1841 it became a church dedicated to Saint John the Evangelist. This became a public concert hall in 1853. In 1912 the hall was turned into Hope Hall Cinema, which continued serving this purpose until it closed in 1963. Prior to its closure the hall had become a meeting place for local artists, poets, folk musicians, and sculptors, including Arthur Dooley, Roger McGough, and Adrian Henri, forming what became known as the Liverpool Scene. This group decided that the building would be suitable for use as a theatre and in September 1964 the Everyman Theatre was opened by Martin Jenkins, Peter James, Michael Freeman and Terry Hands.

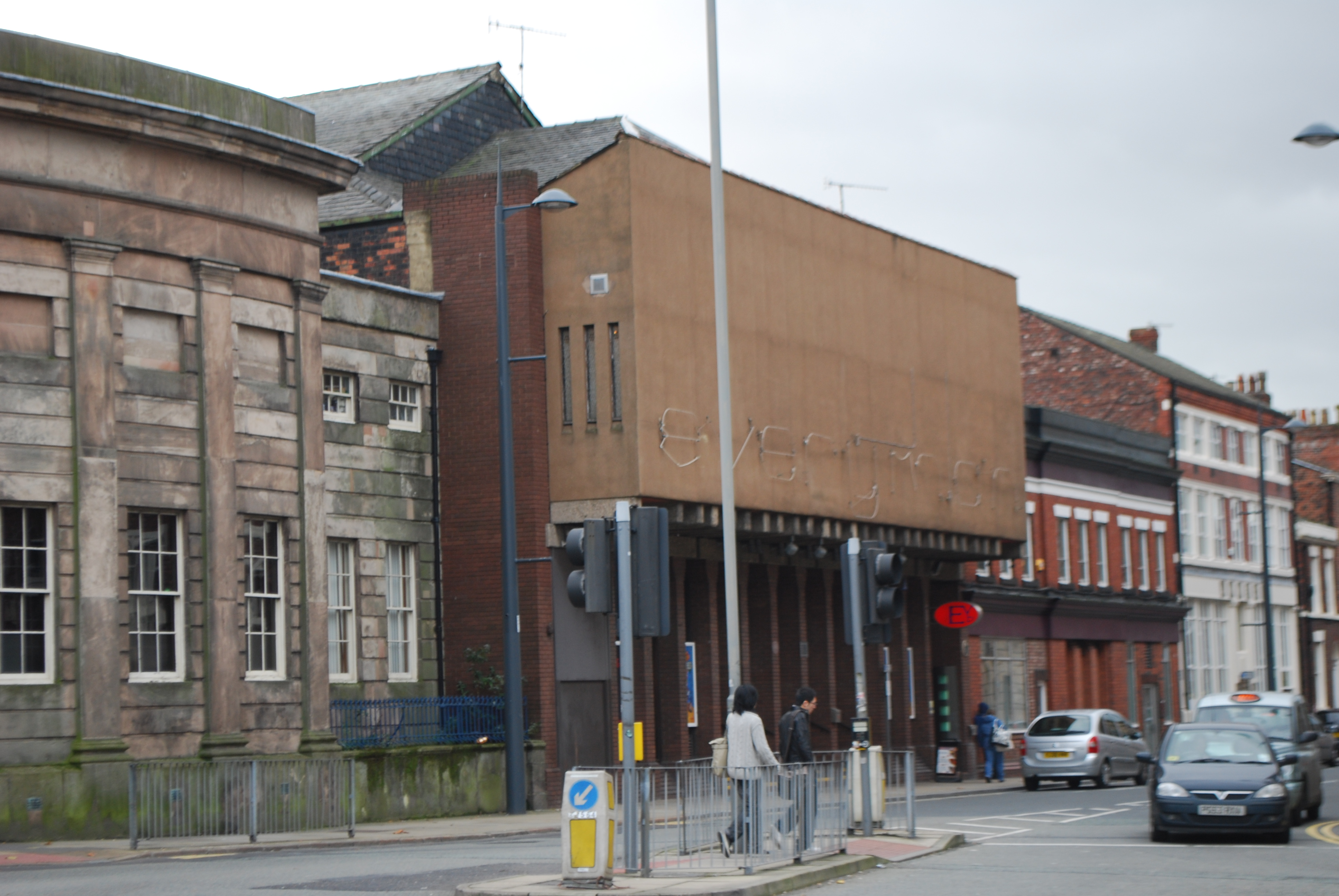
the theatre prior to the 2011–14 rebuilding

In 1975 the theatre closed and was rebuilt, its work being continued as a touring company until it re-opened in September 1977. During the 1970s and the 1980s, led by Director Alan Dossor works of Liverpool playwrights, Alan Dossor, Willy Russell and Alan Bleasdale, received debuts in the theatre: these included Shirley Valentine and John, Paul, George, Ringo … and Bert. In addition to plays, the theatre has produced musicals, concerts, and an annual rock-n-roll panto each Christmas. During its time the theatre has been involved with the careers of Dame Julie Walters, Stephen Graham, Bernard Hill, Jonathan Pryce, Alan Scarfe, Pete Postlethwaite, Antony Sher, Bill Nighy, Barbara Dickson, Matthew Kelly, and Cathy Tyson.

The theatre is managed together with Liverpool Playhouse by Liverpool and Merseyside Theatres Trust since 2004. The two theatres have worked to an integrated programme run by their artistic director and their executive director. Together they are registered as a charity known as Liverpool and Merseyside Theatres Trust Limited.

== Closure and rebuilding ==
In July 2011 the theatre closed to be completely rebuilt. The last major production was Macbeth, starring David Morrissey and Julia Ford, which closed on 11 June. This was followed by performances from Roger McGough and Brian Patten, and by the local pop band Deaf School. The final closure event took place on 2 July. From 28 July contents of the theatre, including seats and benches from the theatre, and pillars from the original Hope Hall, were available for purchase by auction.

The Everyman reopened in February 2014. In October 2014, the Stirling Prize from the Royal Institute of British Architects for the best British building of the year was awarded to Haworth Tompkins for their work on the new Everyman.

Everyman Theatre, Liverpool

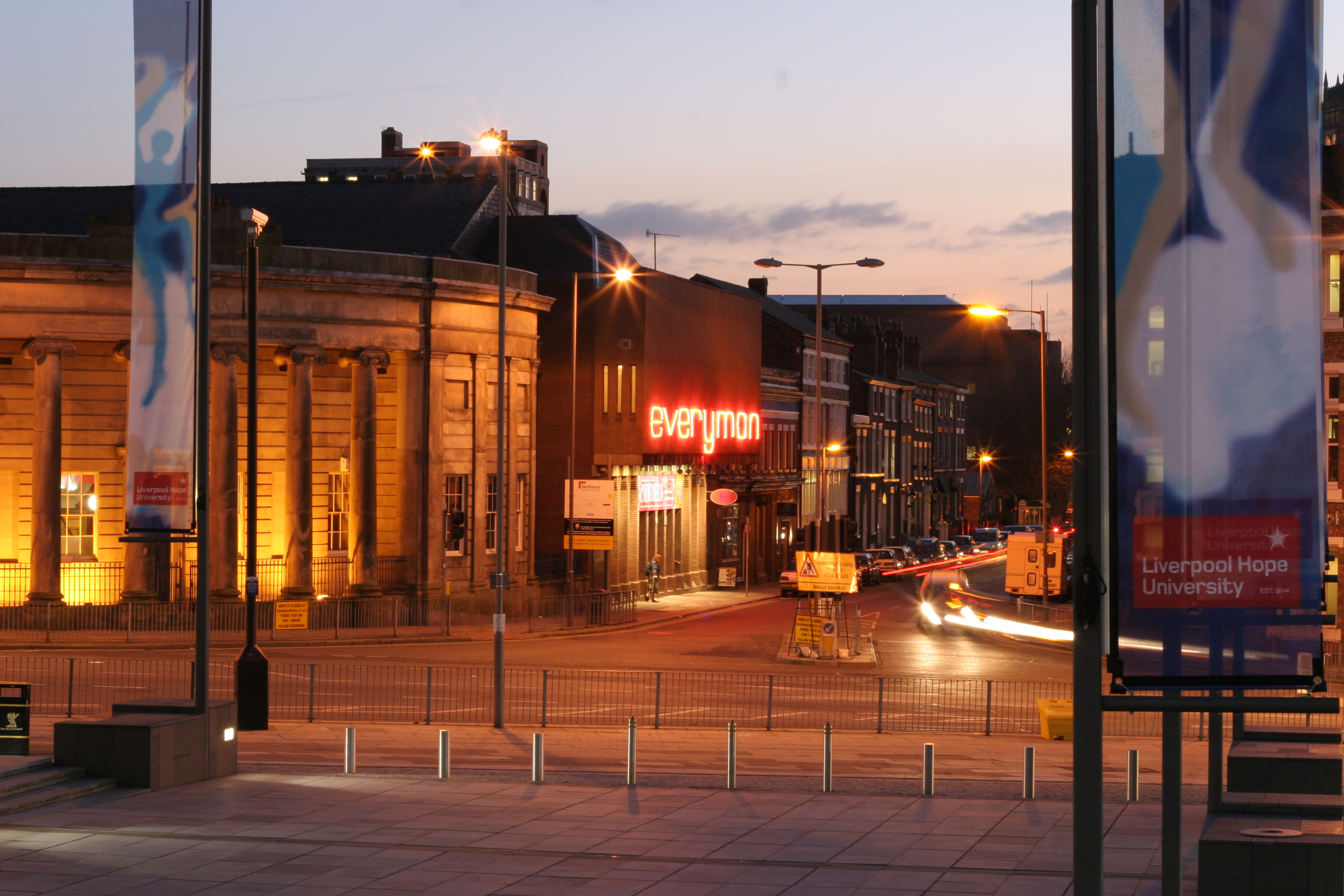
January 2006

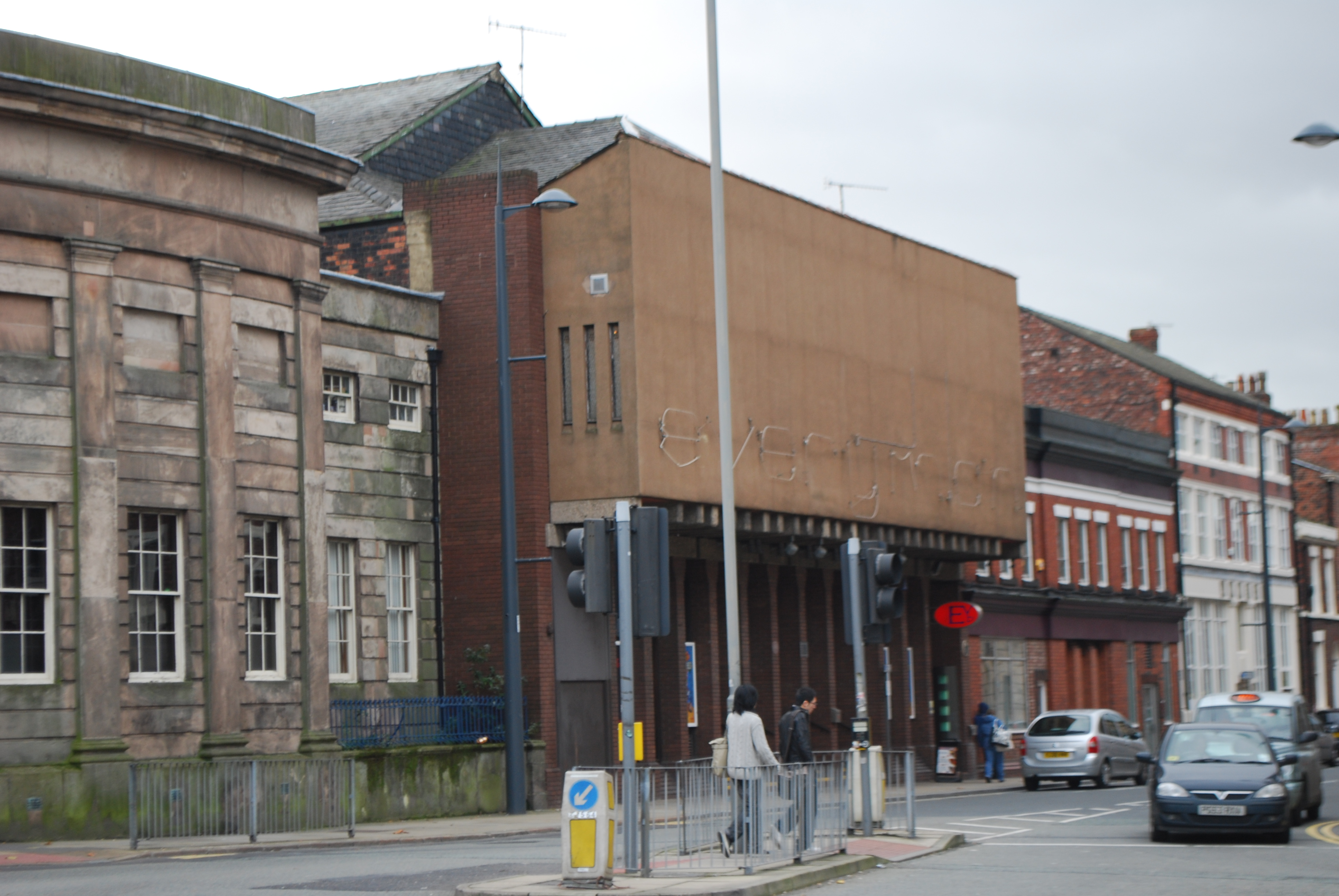
November 2009

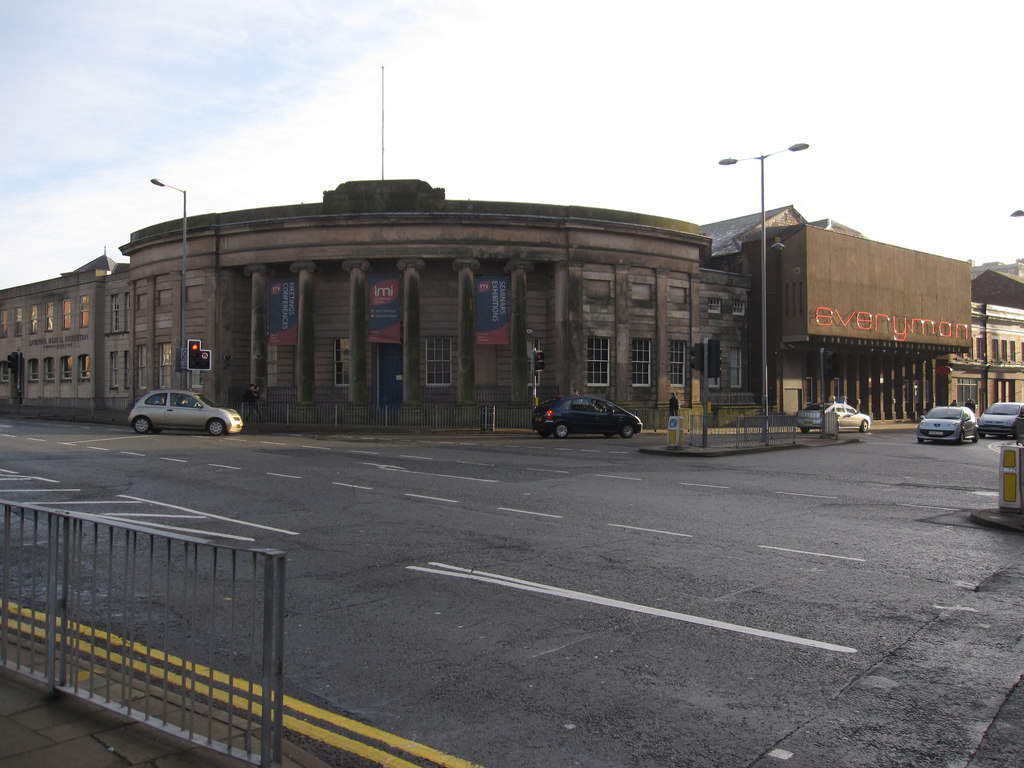
December 2009

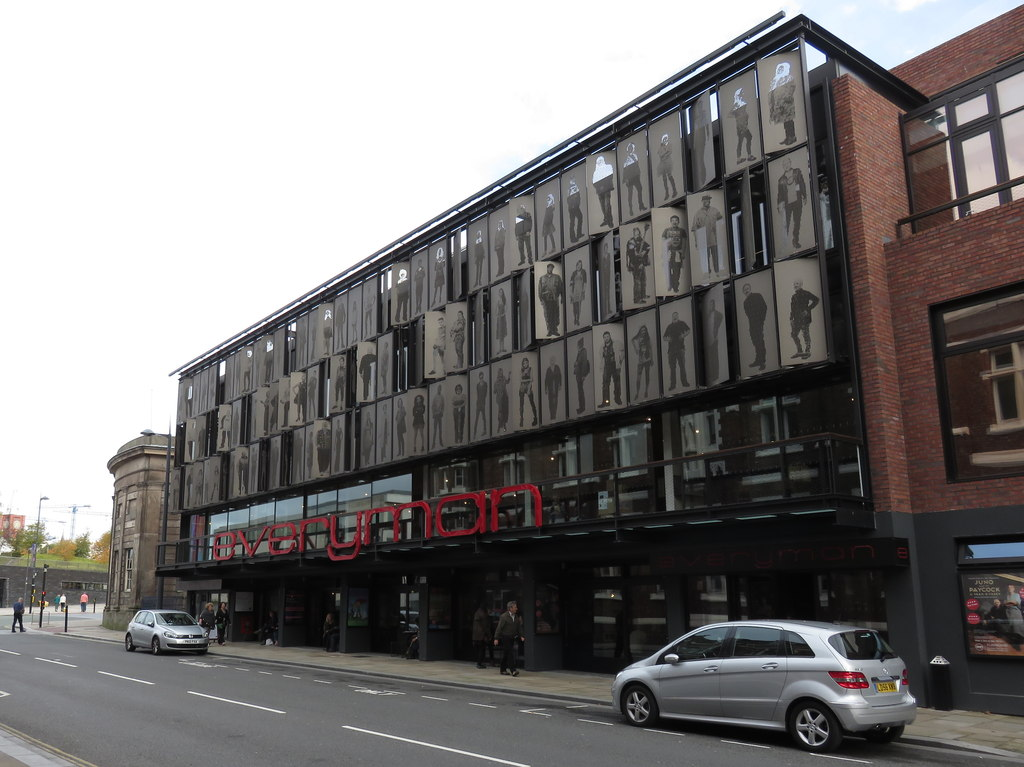
October 2014

== Bistro ==
In 1970, Paddy Byrne and Dave Scott established a restaurant in the basement of the theatre known as the Liverpool Everyman Bistro, which became a popular dining venue in the city. After the Everyman closed for rebuilding in 2011, they retired temporarily and then opened a new restaurant, The Pen Factory, next door in Hope Street. There were plans to create a similar restaurant to be associated with the new theatre but run under different management. However, by 2019 the basement space was in use for events rather than as a bistro. There is a Street Cafe at ground level.

== See also ==
- Rejects Revenge Theatre Company
- The Tiger Who Came To Tea.
